= Tomás de Torquemada =

Grand Inquisitor of Spain (1420–1498)

The Reverend Tomás de Torquemada OP
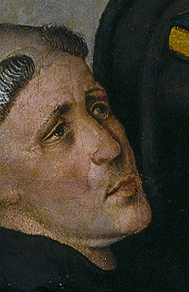
- Torquemada depicted oil on canvas. The Madonna and Child of the Catholic Monarchs (1491), Museo del Prado, Spain.

Grand Inquisitor of the Spanish Inquisition
- In office 1483 – 16 September 1498
- Preceded by: Position established
- Succeeded by: Diego de Deza

Personal details
- Born: 14 October 1420 Torquemada or Valladolid, Kingdom of Castile
- Died: 16 September 1498 (aged 77) Ávila, Kingdom of Castile
- Parent: Don Pedro Ferdinando, lord of Torquemada (father)
- Relatives: Juan de Torquemada (uncle)
- Education: University of Salamanca
- Occupation: Dominican friar

Tomás de Torquemada (Note: English: /ˌtɔːrkɪˈmɑːdə/ TOR-kee-MAH-də, Spanish: [toˈmas ðe toɾkeˈmaða].) OP (14 October 1420 – 16 September 1498), anglicized as Thomas of Torquemada, was a Spanish Dominican friar and the first Grand Inquisitor of the Spanish Inquisition. In that role, he led a group of ecclesiastical prelates created in 1478 to uphold Catholic religious orthodoxy within the newly formed union of the crowns of Castile and Aragon, presently known as the Kingdom of Spain.

In part because of persecution, Muslims and Jews in Castile and Aragon at that time found it socially, politically, and economically advantageous to convert to Catholicism (becoming what were known as conversos, moriscos, and marranos). The existence of superficial converts from Judaism was perceived by the Catholic Monarchs as a threat to the religious and social life in their realms. This led Torquemada to be one of the chief supporters of the Alhambra Decree, which expelled the Jews from Spain in 1492.

Owing to the Inquisition's use of torture to extract confessions and burning at the stake of those declared guilty, and to Torquemada's own approval, even advocacy, of these practices, his name has become synonymous with cruelty, religious intolerance, and fanaticism.

== Biography ==
=== Early life ===
Torquemada was born on 14 October 1420 either in Valladolid, in the Kingdom of Castile, or in the nearby village of Torquemada. The 15th century chronicler Hernando del Pulgar, a contemporary to de Torquemada and himself a converso, recorded that Tomás de Torquemada's uncle, Juan de Torquemada, a celebrated theologian and cardinal, was of converso descent. As a converso, Pulgar is considered to have made this assertion out of hate for Juan de Torquemada's nephew, Tomás de Torquemada. A 2020 study of all of Juan de Torquemada's ancestors found no Jewish converts in his family.

Torquemada entered the local San Pablo Dominican monastery at a very young age. As a zealous advocate of church orthodoxy, he earned a solid reputation for learning, piety, and austerity. As a result, he was promoted to Prior of the monastery of Santa Cruz at Segovia. Around this time, he met the young Princess Isabella I, and the two immediately established religious and ideological rapport. For a number of years, Torquemada served as her regular confessor and personal advisor. He was present at Isabella's coronation in 1474, remained her closest ally and supporter, and even advised her to marry King Ferdinand of Aragon in 1469 to consolidate their kingdoms and form a power base he could draw on for his own purposes. Torquemada subdued Ferdinand's own ambitions and became his confessor also.

=== Establishment of the Holy Office of the Inquisition ===
Torquemada deeply suspected the Marrano and Morisco as a menace to Spain's welfare by both their increasing religious influence and their economic power in Spain. The Crown of Aragon had Dominican inquisitors almost continuously throughout much of the 14th and the 15th centuries. King Ferdinand and Queen Isabella petitioned Pope Sixtus IV to grant their request for a Holy Office to administer an inquisition in Spain. The Pope granted their request and established the Holy Office for the Propagation of the Faith in late 1478.

The papal bull gave the sovereigns full powers to name inquisitors. Rome retained the right to formally appoint the royal nominees. Henry Charles Lea observed that the Spanish Inquisition in both Castile and Aragon remained firmly under Ferdinand's direction throughout the joint reign.

=== Grand Inquisitor ===
The Pope went on to appoint a number of inquisitors for the Spanish Kingdoms in early 1482, including Torquemada. A year later he was named Grand Inquisitor of Spain, which he remained until his death in 1498. In 1484, Torquemada relinquished his role as royal confessor to Diego Deza, a Dominican who would eventually succeed him as Grand Inquisitor. The following year, at a general assembly in Seville, Torquemada promulgated the twenty-eight articles of faith that would be used to guide the inquisitors' investigations.

In the fifteen years under his direction, the Spanish Inquisition grew from a single tribunal at Seville to a network of two dozen Holy Offices. As Grand Inquisitor, Torquemada reorganized the Spanish Inquisition (originally based in Castile in 1478), establishing tribunals in Sevilla, Jaén, Córdoba, Ciudad Real and (later) Saragossa. His quest was to rid Spain of heresy. The Spanish chronicler Sebastián de Olmedo called him "the hammer of heretics, the light of Spain, the savior of his country, the honor of his order".

Under the Alhambra Decree of March 31, 1492, approximately 40,000 Jews were expelled from Spain with only their personal possessions. Approximately 50,000 other Jews received Christian baptism to remain in Spain. Many of them, derogatorily dubbed "Marranos" by the Old Christian majority, secretly kept some of their Jewish traditions. They were among the chief targets of the Inquisition, but it also pursued anyone who criticized it.

So many clemency petitions were sent to Rome that the Pope became aware of Torquemada's severity, and he called the Inquisition's representatives to Rome three times. In addition, Isabella and Ferdinand were so concerned at the quantity of money that was being diverted to the Holy Office that they too protested to the Pope. But Torquemada's power kept him in his position until at least 1494.

There are various estimates of the number of victims of the Spanish Inquisition during Torquemada's reign as Grand Inquisitor. Hernando del Pulgar, Queen Isabella's secretary, wrote that 2,000 executions took place throughout the entirety of her reign, which extended well beyond Torquemada's death.

=== Death ===
On June 23, 1494, Pope Alexander VI appointed Torquemada and four assistant inquisitors to assist with the administration of the Inquisition due to his failing health: Martin Ponce de Leon (Archbishop of Messina), Don Iñigo Manrique de Lara (Bishop of Córdoba), Don Francisco Sánchez de la Fuente (Bishop of Ávila), and Don Alonso Suarez de Fuentelsaz (Bishop of Mondonedo). While officially, this papal appointment of assistants appeared to be due to Torquemada's "failing health", many historians believe that the numerous complaints reaching the Pope about Torquemada's relentless zeal may have been the true cause for this papal appointment of "assistant inquisitors". With his faith in his mission undiminished, but stripped of any real power, Torquemada retired to the monastery of St. Thomas Aquinas in Ávila in 1494, typically leaving the monastery only to attend to the royal family, and once again living the simple life of a friar. In 1498, still holding the office of Grand Inquisitor, he held his last general assembly, where new rules were formulated to assure the continuation of the Inquisition in Spain. These rules attempted to curb some of the administrative abuses for which complaints had been lodged against the Inquisition. After fifteen years as Spain's Grand Inquisitor, Torquemada died in the monastery on 16 September 1498 and was interred there. His tomb was ransacked in 1832, only two years before the Inquisition was finally disbanded. His bones were allegedly stolen and ritually incinerated in the same manner as an auto-da-fé.

== See also ==
- History of the World, Part I#The Spanish Inquisition

== Notes ==
Catholic Church titles
New title Office established	Grand Inquisitor of Spain; 1483–1498	Succeeded by Diego Deza
