= Olmedo =

Olmedo may refer to:

== Places ==
- Olmedo, Sardinia, a town near Sassari
- Olmedo, Valladolid, a town in the province of Valladolid, Spain
  - The First Battle of Olmedo, which took place in the aforementioned town in 1445
  - The Second Battle of Olmedo, which took place in the aforementioned town in 1467
- Fuente-Olmedo, a village in the province of Valladolid, Spain
- Llano de Olmedo, a village in the province of Valladolid, Spain
- Olmedo Canton, Loja, a canton in the province of Loja, Ecuador
- Olmedo Canton, Manabí, a canton in the province of Manabí, Ecuador

== People ==
- Alberto Olmedo (1933–1988), Argentine comedian
- Alex Olmedo (1936–2020), Peruvian-American tennis player
- Alonso de Olmedo y Ormeño (1626–1682), Spanish actor and playwright
- Atcel Olmedo (2002–2005), Mexican-American child murder victim
- Carmen Olmedo (1909-1985), Peruvian actress, dancer, songwriter, vedette
- Dolores Olmedo (1908–2002), Mexican businesswoman, philanthropist, and musician
- Esteban L. Olmedo, Argentinian American psychologist
- Fernando Olmedo Reguera (1873–1936), Catholic priest, journalist and victim of the Spanish Civil War
- José Joaquín de Olmedo (1780–1847), President of Ecuador and poet
- José Manuel Rojas Olmedo (born 1987), Spanish footballer
- Laura Piña Olmedo (born 1959), Mexican politician
- Leonel Olmedo (born 1981), Mexican footballer
- Manuel Olmedo (born 1983), Spanish middle-distance runner
- María Del Mar Olmedo Justicia (born 1983), Spanish paralympic judoka
- María García Olmedo (born 1957), Mexican politician
- Nicolás Olmedo (born 1983), Argentine footballer
- Olmedo Sáenz (born 1970), Panamanian baseball player
- Onib Olmedo (1937–1996), Filipino painter
- Pablo Olmedo (born 1975), Mexican distance runner
- Quiterio Olmedo (fl. 1907–1930), Paraguayan footballer
- Raquel Olmedo (born 1937), Cuban actress and singer
- Ray Olmedo (born 1981), Venezuelan baseball player
- Roberto Ortega Olmedo (born 1991), Spanish tennis player
- Sebastián de Olmedo, Spanish contemporary chronicler of the Inquisition
- Segundo Olmedo (born 1948), Panamanian Olympic wrestler
- Silvia Olmedo (born 1976), Mexican sexologist and TV host

== Other uses ==
- Centro Deportivo Olmedo, a football club from Ecuador
