= Diocese of Mallorca =

Roman Catholic diocese in Spain

Coordinates: 39°34′02″N 2°38′55″E

Diocese of Mallorca Dioecesis Maioricensis Diócesis de Mallorca (es) Diòcesi de Mallorca (ca)

Catholic
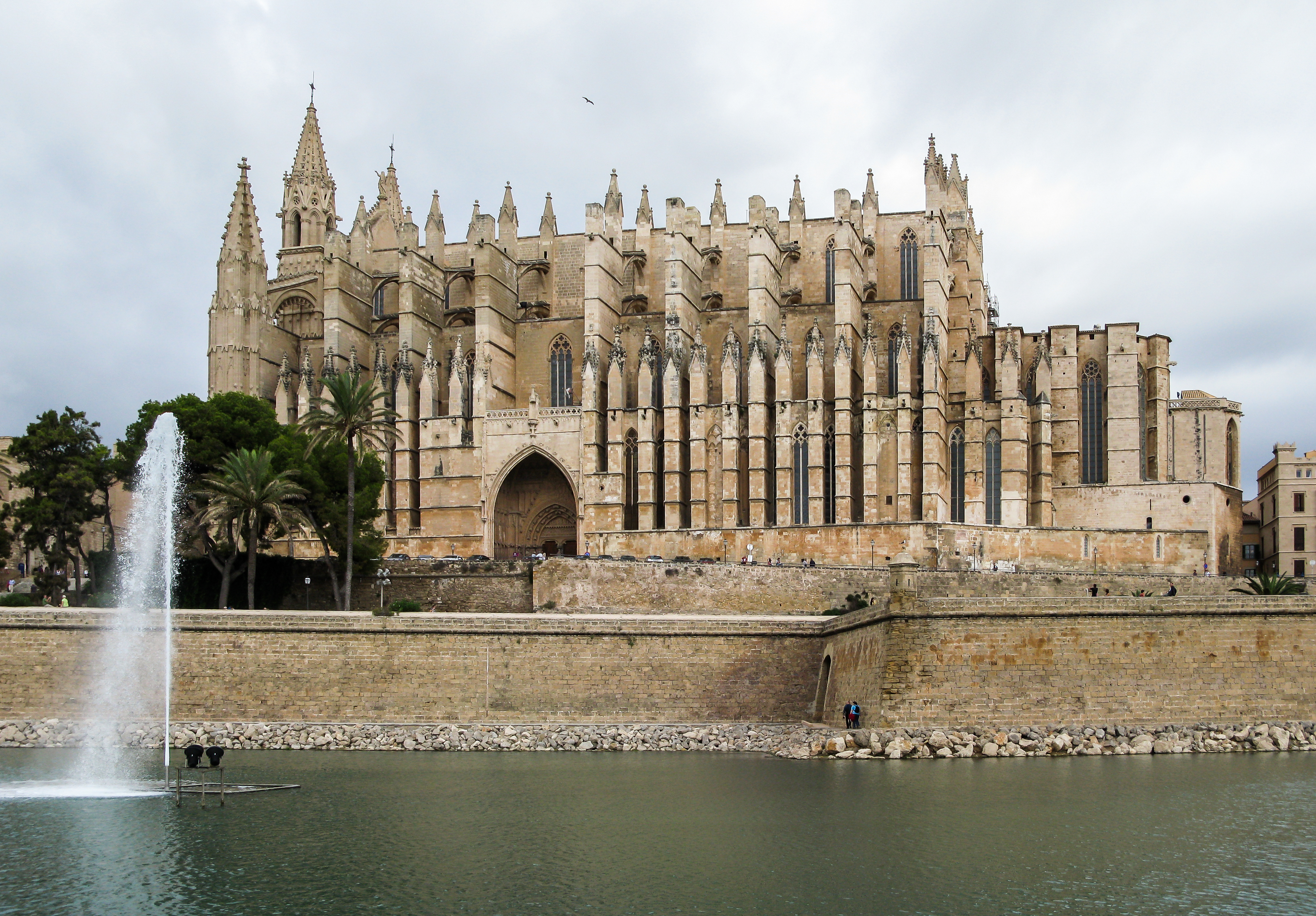
- Palma Cathedral

Location
- Country: Spain
- Ecclesiastical province: Valencia
- Metropolitan: Valencia

Statistics
- Area: 3,604 km^{2} (1,392 sq mi)
- Population: Total; Catholics: (as of 2004); 753,584; 594,860 (78.9%)

Information
- Denomination: Roman Catholic
- Rite: Latin Rite
- Cathedral: Cathedral of St Mary in Palma

Current leadership
- Pope: Leo XIV
- Bishop: Sebastiá Taltavull Anglada
- Metropolitan Archbishop: Enrique Benavent Vidal

Map
- The Diocese of Mallorca in blue.

Website
- Website of the Diocese

The Diocese of Mallorca (Latin: Dioecesis Maioricensis) is a Latin Church diocese of the Catholic Church located in the city of Palma, Mallorca in the ecclesiastical province of Valencia in Spain.

== History ==
- 450: Established as Diocese of Mallorca
- 1237: Restored as Diocese of Mallorca from Diocese of Barcelona

== Special churches ==
- Minor Basilicas:
  - Basílica de Nostra Senyora de Lluc, Mallorca, Illes Balears
  - Basílica de Sant Francesc, Palma, Illes Balears

== Leadership ==
- Raimundo Torrelles (12 Oct 1238 – 11 Jun 1266 Died)
- Pedro Morella (4 Oct 1266 – 1282 Died)

. . .

- Guillermo Vilanova (15 Mar 1304 – 1318 Died)
- Guido Terrena, O. Carm. (15 Apr 1321 – 27 Jul 1332 Appointed, Bishop of Elne)
- Berenguer Battle (27 Jul 1332 – 1 Nov 1349 Died)

. . .

- Antonio Galiana (5 Jul 1363 – 9 Apr 1375 Died)

. . .

- Francesco Climent Sapera (Pérez Clemente) (17 Aug 1403 – 20 Jun 1407 Appointed, Bishop of Tortosa)

. . .

- Francesco Ferrer (13 Feb 1467 – 17 Jun 1475 Died)

. . .

- Rodrigo de Borja (9 Oct 1489 – 11 Aug 1492 Elected, Pope)
- Giovanni Battista Savelli (31 Aug 1492 – 27 Mar 1493 Resigned)
- Guillermo Ramón de Moncada (1493 – 16 Mar 1496 Appointed, Bishop of Tarazona)
- Antonio de Rojas Manrique (1496–1507 Appointed, Archbishop of Granada)
- Diego Ribera de Toledo (22 Dec 1507 – 29 Oct 1511 Appointed, Bishop of Segovia)
- Rodrigo Sánchez Mercado (29 Oct 1511 – 12 Jan 1530 Appointed, Bishop of Ávila)
- Agostino de Grimaldis (1530–1532)

. . .

- Juan Bautista Campeggio (30 May 1539 – 4 Nov 1558 Resigned)
- Diego Arnedo (19 Sep 1561 – 17 Oct 1572 Appointed, Bishop of Huesca)
- Juan Vich Manrique de Lara (31 Jul 1573 – 10 May 1604 Appointed, Archbishop of Tarragona)
- Alfonso Laso Sedeño (1 Dec 1604 – 21 Aug 1607 Died)
- Simón Vicente Bauzá, O.P. (7 Jan 1608 – 5 Dec 1625 Died)
- Félix Guzmán (21 May 1625 – 5 Jun 1625 Died)
- Baltasar Borja (15 Sep 1625 – 11 Jul 1630 Died)
- Juan de Santander, O.F.M. (10 Feb 1631 – 24 Jan 1644 Died)
- Tomás Rocamora, O.P. (14 Nov 1644 – 15 Nov 1653 Died)
- Miguel Pérez de Nueros (14 May 1655 – 12 Feb 1656 Died)
- Diego Escolano y Ledesma (26 Jun 1656 – 19 Jul 1660 Appointed, Bishop of Tarazona)
- Pedro-Fernando Manjarrés de Heredia (6 Dec 1660 – 26 Dec 1670 Died)
- Bernardo Luis Cotoner (28 Sep 1671 – 18 Jan 1684 Died)
- Pedro de Alagón y de Cardona (2 Oct 1684 – 3 May 1701 Died)
- Francisco Antonio de la Portilla, O.F.M. (12 May 1702 – 7 Jun 1711 Died)
- Atanasio Esterriga Trajanáuregui (1 Jun 1712 – 5 Jul 1721 Died)
- Juan Fernández Zapata (1 Jun 1722 – 3 Aug 1729 Confirmed, Bishop of León)
- Benito Pañelles Escardó, O.S.B. (24 Jul 1730 – 26 Nov 1743 Died)
- José Cepeda (13 Jul 1744 – 17 Jan 1750 Died)
- Lorenzo Despuig Cotoner (27 Apr 1750 – 18 Jul 1763 Appointed, Archbishop of Tarragona)
- Francisco Garrido de la Vega (18 Jul 1763 – 30 Mar 1772 Appointed, Bishop of Córdoba)
- Juan Díaz de La Guerra (22 Jun 1772 – 23 Jun 1777 Appointed, Bishop of Sigüenza)
- Pedro Rubio-Benedicto Herrero (30 Mar 1778 – 21 Feb 1794 Appointed, Bishop of Jaén)
- Bernardo Nadal Crespí (12 Sep 1794 – 12 Dec 1818 Died)
- Pedro González Vallejo (27 Sep 1819 – 25 Jun 1825 Resigned)
- Antonio Pérez de Hirias (27 Jun 1825 – 18 Dec 1842 Died)
- Rafael Manso (17 Dec 1847 – 17 Feb 1851 Appointed, Bishop of Zamora)
- Miguel Salvá y Munar (5 Sep 1851 – 4 Nov 1873 Died)
- Mateo Jaume y Garau (17 Sep 1875 – 19 Feb 1886 Died)
- Jacinto María Cervera y Cervera (10 Jun 1886 – 14 Nov 1897 Died)
- Pedro Juan Campins y Barceló (4 May 1898 – 23 Feb 1915 Died)
- Rigoberto Domenech y Valls (5 May 1916 – 16 Dec 1924 Appointed, Archbishop of Zaragoza)
- Gabriel Llompart y Jaume Santandreu (30 Apr 1925 – 9 Dec 1928 Died)
- José Miralles y Sbert (13 Mar 1930 – 23 Dec 1947 Died)
- Juan Hervás y Benet (22 Dec 1947 – 14 Mar 1955 Appointed, Prelate of Ciudad Real)
- Jesús Enciso Viana (30 May 1955 – 21 Sep 1964 Died)
- Rafael Alvarez Lara (10 Mar 1965 – 13 Apr 1973 Resigned)
- Teodoro Ubeda Gramage (13 Apr 1973 – 18 May 2003 Died)
- Jesús Murgui Soriano (27 Dec 2003 – 27 Jul 2012 Appointed, Bishop of Orihuela-Alicante)
- Javier Salinas Viñals (16 Nov 2012 – 8 Sep 2016); named Auxiliary Bishop of the Roman Catholic Archdiocese of Valencia, in Valencia, Spain, by Pope Francis; Auxiliary Bishop Sebastià Taltavull Anglada of the Roman Catholic Archdiocese of Barcelona, in Barcelona, Spain, was named Apostolic Administrator
- Sebastiá Taltavull Anglada (19 Sep 2017 – present)

== See also ==
- Roman Catholicism in Spain

== Sources ==
- GCatholic.org
- Catholic Hierarchy
- Diocese website
