= Gonzalo de Illescas =

Gonzalo de Illescas may refer to:

- Gonzalo de Illescas (bishop), died 1464
- Gonzalo de Illescas (historian) (1521–1574?)
