= Juan de Soria =

Roman Catholic prelate

Most Reverend Juan de Soria
- Bishop of Burgos
- Church: Catholic Church
- Diocese: Diocese of Burgos
- In office: 1240–1246
- Previous post: Bishop of Osma (1231–1240)

Personal details
- Died: 1 October 1246

Juan de Soria (died 1 October 1246), also known as Juan Díaz, Juan Domínguez de Medina or Juan Ruiz de Medina, was a Roman Catholic prelate who served as Bishop of Osma (1231–1240) and Bishop of Burgos (1240–1246) as well as in the chancery of King Ferdinand III of Castile (from 1211).

== Biography ==
Prior to becoming bishop, Juan served as abbot of Santander and Valladolid. In 1231, he was appointed by Pope Gregory IX as Bishop of Osma. On 29 May 1240, was he appointed by Pope Gregory IX as Bishop of Burgos where served until his death on 1 Oct 1246. While Bishop, he served as the principal consecrator of Lope Fitero, Bishop of Córdoba (1237), and Rodrigo Díaz, Bishop of Oviedo (1243).

Juan was probably the author of the Latin Chronicle of the Kings of Castile, written between 1217 and 1239.
