= Iñigo Manrique de Lara =

Iñigo Manrique de Lara may refer to:

- Iñigo Manrique de Lara (archbishop) (died 1485), Spanish Roman Catholic archbishop
- Iñigo Manrique de Lara (bishop) (died 1496), Spanish Roman Catholic bishop
