= University of Oñati =

Former university in Oñati, Gipuzkoa, Spain

The University of Oñati (Basque: Oñatiko Unibertsitatea; Spanish: Universidad de Oñate), officially the University of the Holy Spirit or Sancti Spiritus, was a University founded in 1540 and located in the Basque town of Oñati in Spain. Until its closure in 1901, it was the only university in the Spanish Basque Country. Its building is now the home of the International Institute for the Sociology of Law.

== History ==
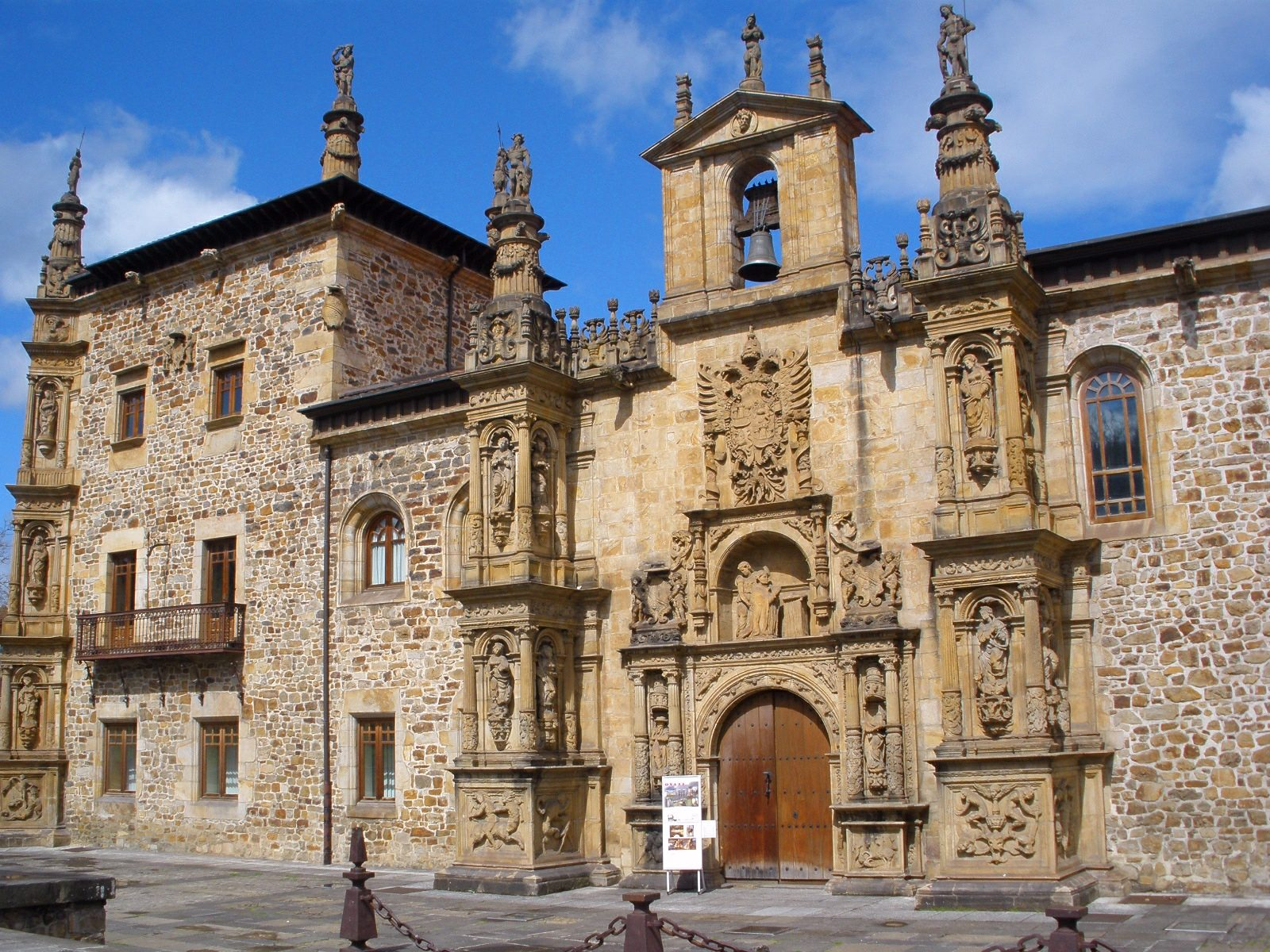
Facade of the University building

Founded in 1540 by the Bishop of Avila, Rodrigo Sánchez Mercado under the authority of a bull of Pope Paul III, the University of the Holy Spirit was originally located in Hernani, but in 1548 moved to Oñati. The University specialised in theology, law, canon law, the arts and medicine and was strictly limited to Catholics until 1869, when it was opened to all. The institution closed in 1901. Since 1989, the building houses the International Institute for Sociology of Law (IISL).

== Building ==
In 1931 the building was declared a National Historic Monument. It is considered one of the most remarkable Renaissance buildings of the Basque Country, and was built in the Plateresque style. Construction of the building began in 1543 by the master stonemason Domingo de la Carrera and the sculptor Pierre Picart.
