= Hernando de Talavera =

Spanish clergyman and royal councilor (c. 1430–1507)

Servant of God Hernando de Talavera
- Archbishop of Granada
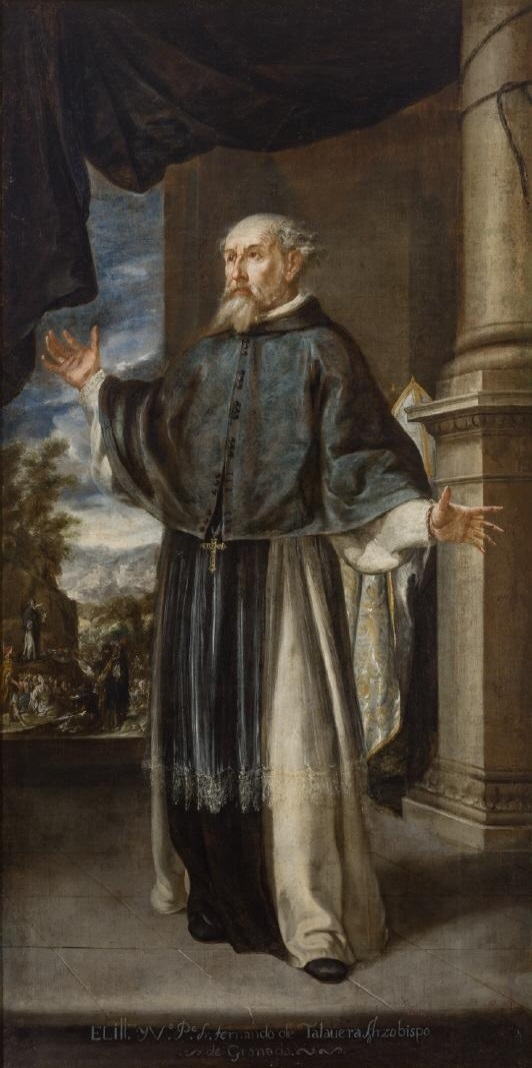
- Fray Hernando de Talavera (1656-57), by Juan de Valdés Leal, Museo de Bellas Artes de Sevilla
- Church: Catholic Church
- Archdiocese: Archdiocese of Granada
- In office: 1492–1500
- Predecessor: Newly established
- Successor: Francisco Jiménez de Cisneros
- Previous post: Bishop of Ávila (1485–1492)

Personal details
- Born: 1428 Talavera de la Reina, Spain
- Died: 14 May 1507 (age 79) Granada, Spain

Hernando de Talavera, O.S.H. (c. 1430 – 14 May 1507) was a Spanish clergyman and councilor to Queen Isabel of Castile. He began his career as a monk of the Order of Saint Jerome, was appointed the queen's confessor and with her support and patronage, became the Archbishop of Granada.

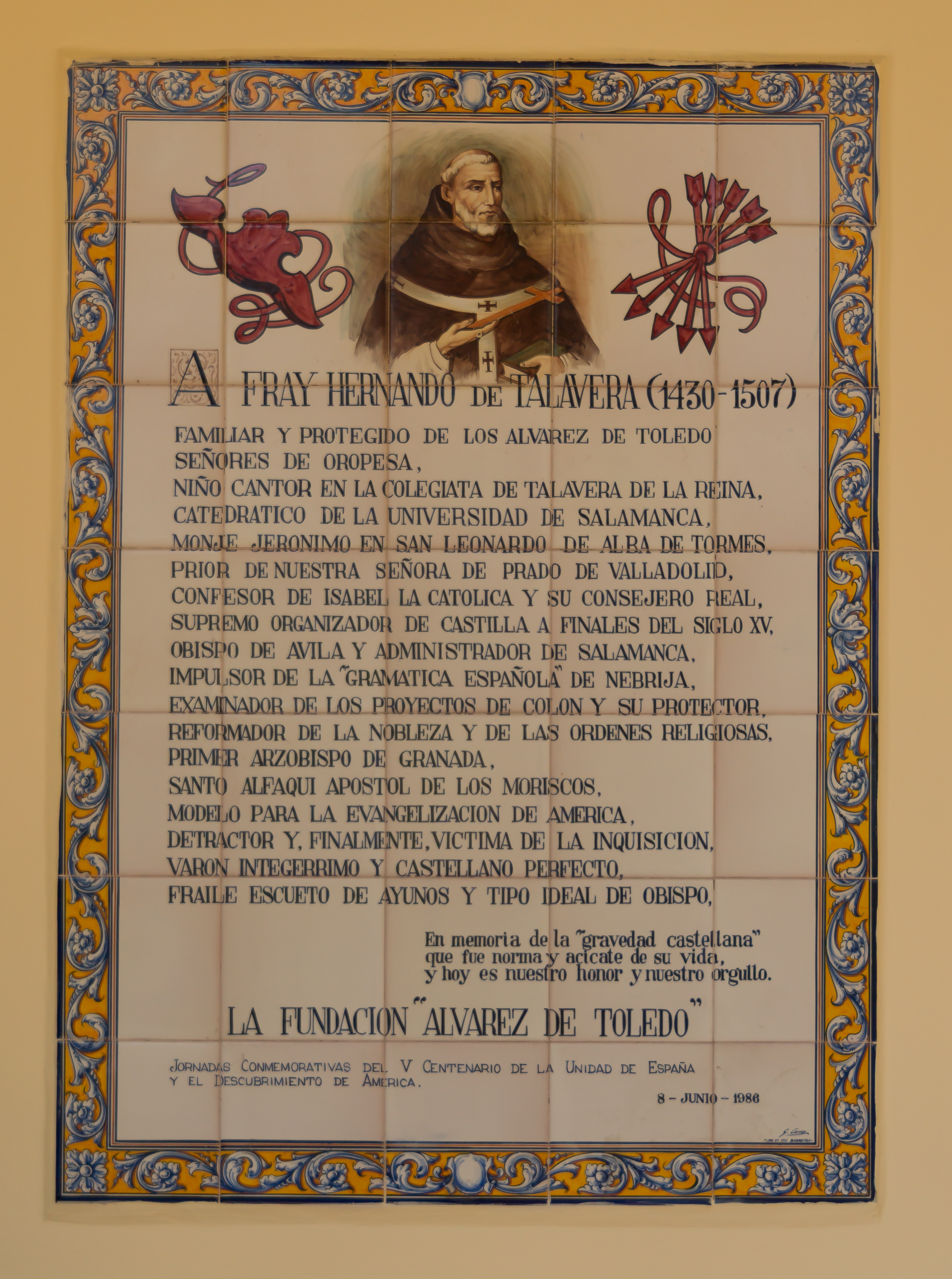
A plaque to Hernando de Talavera, San Jeronimo monastery, Granada, Spain.

Talavera also served on the royal council and was relied upon to undertake important assignments for the Crown. In 1479 he was sent to Portugal to ensure that Isabel’s rival, Juana of Castile, entered a convent as previously agreed. In 1486, Talavera facilitated an introduction between Christopher Columbus and Isabel, after which the queen instructed Talavera to establish a commission to consider the feasibility of the Columbus proposal.

After the conquest of Granada in 1492, Talavera was appointed the first Archbishop of Granada, a position he held until 1500. He was known for his efforts to convert Muslims to Christianity through education and persuasion rather than force. He was also a long-time opponent of the Spanish Inquisition, a position that ultimately led to his denouncement and arrest by the Inquisitor Diego Rodríguez de Lucero. Talavera was ultimately cleared of these charges by the intervention of Pope Julius II.

== Biography ==
Talavera was born around 1430 in Talavera de la Reina. His ancestry is obscure. He may have been illegitimate, his mother from a converso family and his father part of the Alvarez de Toledo family, lords of Oropesa (they later financed part of his education). He entered the University of Salamanca at the age of fifteen and received a Bachelor of Arts three years later. He continued with his studies in theology and law and eventually took a position at the university teaching moral philosophy.

He left the university in 1460 and became an ordained priest. In 1466 he joined the Hieronymite order at the monastery, San Leonardo de Alba de Tormes. In 1470 he was appointed prior of the Monastery of Nuestra Señora del Prado in Valladolid, where he developed extensive reforms for the order.

=== Royal councilor ===
In the early 1470s, his religious writings and reform efforts brought him to the attention of the newly-crowned queen, Isabel I of Castile. Cardinal Pedro González de Mendoza, a key supporter of Isabel, may have introduced Talavera to the court. By 1475, Talavera became Isabel's confessor and in January, 1476, he presented her with a treatise, "How all loyal Christians should renew their spirits during Advent." More than just an Advent sermon, it was both an inspirational spiritual tract and a politically astute guide that had a lifelong influence on queen's approach to her reign.

Talavera also served on the royal council and was relied upon to undertake important assignments for the Crown. In 1479 he was sent to Portugal to ensure that Isabel's rival, Juana of Castile, entered a convent as previously agreed. He also headed a commission to look at royal prerogatives in the Canary Islands. At Isabel's request, Talavera mentored a young Juan Rodríguez de Fonseca who later became the powerful de facto minister of Spain's emerging colonial empire.

In 1485, when Christopher Columbus approached the Spanish Crown to propose his voyage of discovery, Talavera was likely one of his first contacts at court. He facilitated an introduction between Columbus and Isabel around 1486 and was instructed by the queen to establish a commission to investigate the feasibility of the Columbus proposal. The commission seems to have met only intermittently and it was not until 1490 that the board recommended against the plan. Later, in 1492, Fernando and Isabel overrode the board's decision and decided to sponsor Columbus.

Talavera was appointed to the bishopric of Ávila in 1486. The population in Ávila included prominent Jewish and mudéjar communities. His experience in dealing with these religious minorities would later influence his approach to the Muslim population in Granada when he became archbishop there.

=== Archbishop of Granada ===
After the conquest of Granada in 1492, the rights of the Muslim majority to practice their religion was guaranteed in the terms of surrender set forth by Spain. In 1493, Talavera was appointed Archbishop of Granada, a challenging assignment that demonstrated the Crown's trust in his abilities. However, it also marked a turning point in his influence at court when Francisco Jiménez de Cisneros was named to replace him as Isabel's confessor.

Talavera's preferred approach was the peaceful conversion of the population to Christianity, explaining to them in their own language the nature of the Christian religion and its superiority over Islam. He promoted the study of the Arabic language, a language he learned himself and encouraged his clergy to do likewise. The Granadines respected Talavera and were grateful for his adherence to the terms of the peace agreement but his approach yielded few converts.

Meanwhile the influence of Cisneros continued to grow and when he was appointed Archbishop of Toledo, he became the senior-ranking member of the Catholic hierarchy in Spain. When he came to Grenada in 1499, Cisneros brought with him a much more aggressive approach to conversion. Overriding Talavera's objections, his actions incited a revolt which threatened Cisneros' life and was only quashed by the timely intervention of royal forces. To avoid further bloodshed, Talavera promised amnesty to any rebels who converted to Christianity and some 50,000 took advantage of his offer.

After the rebellion in the city, Cisneros continued to push his aggressive efforts to convert Muslims in the countryside. A second rebellion ensued and royal forces were again required to put down the rebels. Isabel decided that a peaceful solution was not possible and in February 1502, she issued an edict requiring all adult Muslims in Castile to convert to Christianity or face expulsion.

=== Inquisition ===
Talavera had been opposed to the Spanish Inquisition for many years. After the death of his protector Queen Isabel in 1504, he was denounced by the notorious Inquisitor Diego Rodríguez de Lucero and accused of establishing a synagogue in his palace where he conducted Jewish ceremonies with family and other clerics. In the eyes of Lucero, however, his real crime was likely his long-time opposition to the Inquisition. His relatives and household servants were arrested but Talavera himself was untouched until King Philip authorized his arrest in July 1506. The papal nuncio Giovanni Ruffo appealed to Pope Julius II who cleared Talavera of all charges and ordered him released. Talavera died a short time later on 14 May 1507.

Catholic Church titles
Preceded by Alfonso de Fonseca	Bishop of Ávila; 1485–1493	Succeeded by Francisco Sánchez de la Fuente
Preceded by no predecessor	Archbishop of Granada; 1493–1507	Succeeded by Antonio de Rojas Manrique
