= Demetrio Fernández González =

Roman Catholic bishop

- Bishop of Córdoba
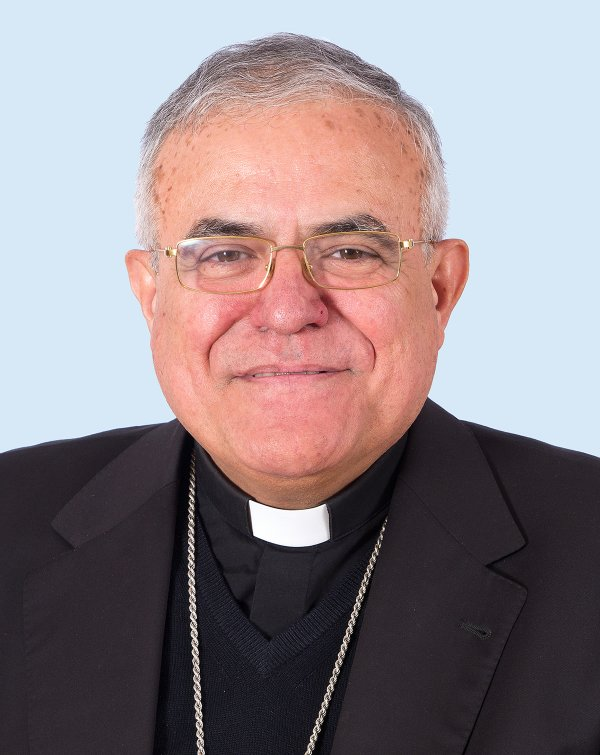

Orders
- Ordination: 22 December 1974 by Cardinal Marcelo González Martín

Personal details
- Born: 15 February 1950 (age 76)
- Denomination: Roman Catholic
- Motto: Ecce venio
- Coat of arms

Demetrio Fernández González (born 15 February 1950) is a Spanish prelate of the Roman Catholic Church serving as bishop of the Diocese of Córdoba, Spain, since 18 February 2010.

== Biography ==
He was a pupil of the seminary of Talavera de la Reina and the minor seminary of the Archdiocese of Toledo. His tertiary education he received at the San Ildefonso Major Seminary of Toledo and the seminary of Palencia.

He was ordained priest on 22 December 1974 in Toledo by Cardinal Marcelo González Martín. He was the coadjutor of "The Good Shepherd" in Toledo (1974–1977) and chaplain of the College Vedruna (1976). Later he studied in Rome (1977–1980), the Pontifical Spanish College, where he earned a licence in dogmatic theology from the Pontifical Gregorian University.

Later in 1980 the professor of theology named in the subject of Christology and Soteriology in the Major Seminary "San Ildefonso" in Toledo. He was curate in the parish "Saints Justo and Pastor" and "San Ildefonso" the capital of Toledo. In 1983 he was appointed Counsellor Diocesan Adult Movement of Catholic Action. And that same year to start the Major Seminary "Santa Leocadia" for adult vocations, he was appointed Vicerretor (1983–1986), and later Rector of the same (1986–1992).

In 1992, Cardinal González Martín is appointed Pro-Vicar General. In 1999, with D. Antonio Cañizares headquarters in Toledo, was appointed pastor of the Church of Santo Tomé in Toledo.

In January 2012, Bishop Fernandez said there was a conspiracy by the United Nations. "The Minister for Family of the Papal Government, Cardinal Antonelli, told me a few days ago in Zaragoza that UNESCO has a program for the next 20 years to make half the world population homosexual. To do this they have distinct programs, and will continue to implant the ideology that is already present in our schools."

== See also ==
- History of Roman Catholicism in Spain

Catholic Church titles
| Preceded by Juan Asenjo Pelegrina | Bishop of Córdoba; 18 Feb 2010 – present | Succeeded by incumbent |
