= Rodrigo Díaz (bishop) =

Roman Catholic prelate

Most Reverend Rodrigo Díaz
- Bishop of Oviedo
- Church: Catholic Church
- Diocese: Diocese of Oviedo
- In office: 1240–1249

Orders
- Consecration: by Juan Domínguez de Medina

Personal details
- Died: 31 August 1249

Rodrigo Díaz (died 31 August 1249) was a Roman Catholic prelate who served as Bishop of Oviedo (1243–1249).

On 17 September 1243, Rodrigo Díaz was appointed by Pope Innocent IV as Bishop of Oviedo. He was consecrated by Juan Domínguez de Medina, Bishop of Burgos. He served as Bishop of Oviedo until his death on 31 August 1249.
