= Juan Asenjo Pelegrina =

Spanish Catholic bishop

His Excellency Juan José Asenjo Pelegrina
- Archbishop Emeritus of Seville
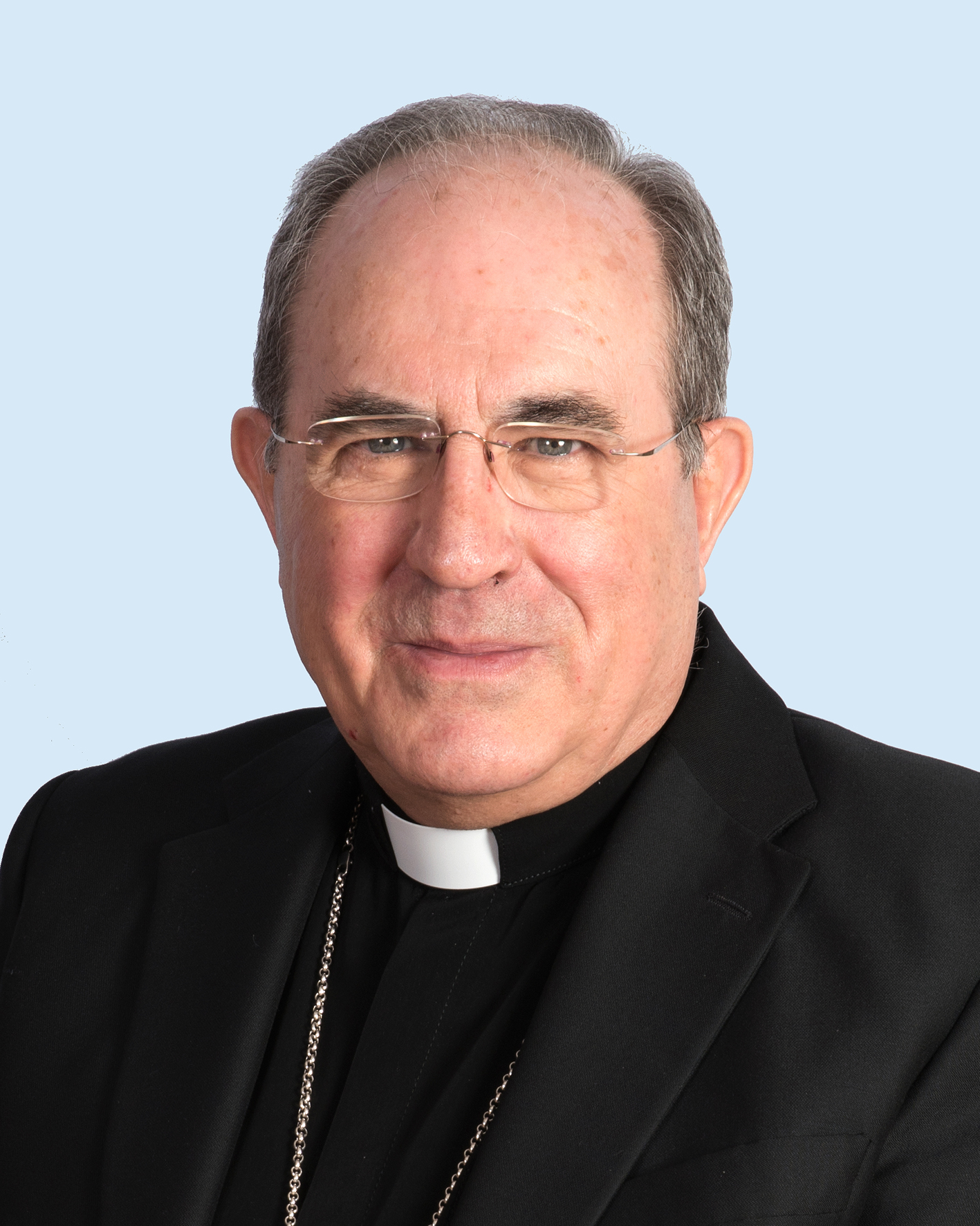
- Church: Roman Catholic
- Archdiocese: Seville
- Installed: 5 November 2009
- Term ended: 17 April 2021
- Predecessor: Carlos Amigo Vallejo
- Successor: José Ángel Saiz Meneses
- Previous posts: Auxiliary Bishop of Toledo (1997–2003); Bishop of Córdoba (2003–2008); Coadjutor Archbishop of Seville (2008–2009)

Orders
- Ordination: 21 September 1969 by Laureano Castán Lacoma
- Consecration: 20 April 1997 by Francisco Álvarez Martínez
- Rank: Archbishop

Personal details
- Born: 15 October 1945 (age 80) Sigüenza Spain
- Motto: Ex Alto
- Coat of arms

Styles of Juan Asenjo Pelegrina
- Reference style: The Most Reverend
- Spoken style: Your Excellency
- Religious style: Archbishop
- Posthumous style: not applicable

Juan José Asenjo Pelegrina (born 15 October 1945) is a Spanish prelate of the Catholic Church who was the Archbishop of Seville from 5 November 2009 until his retirement on 17 April 2021.

== Biography ==
Juan José Asenjo Pelegrina was born in Sigüenza on 15 October 1945. He entered the seminary and studied theology and philosophy. He was ordained a priest on 21 September 1969. In 1971 he received a licentiate in theology at the Theological Faculty of Burgos. From 1977 to 1979 he attended courses for a doctorate in Church history at the Pontifical Gregorian University in Rome. He also holds a Diploma in Archives and Library Science at the Vatican Library and archiving the Vatican Secret Archives.

He served as professor of ecclesiology and history of the Church at the seminary of Sigüenza from 1971 to 1974. He also held the positions of vice-rector of the seminary (1974–1977), director of the university residence "Ntra. Sra. De la Estrella" on Sigüenza (1979–1988), director of the diocesan archive (1979–1981), diocesan director for education (1980–1982), canon in charge of the artistic heritage (1985–1997), diocesan director for cultural heritage 1985-1993), vice rector of the sanctuary of "Nuestra Señora de la Salud" of Barbatona (1994–1997). From 1993 to 1997 he was undersecretary of the Episcopal Conference. In 1986 he founded and directed the magazine Abside and is the author of several publications.

On 27 February 1997, Pope John Paul II appointed him Titular Bishop of Iziriana and Auxiliary Bishop of Toledo. He received episcopal consecration on 20 April that year. From 1998 to 2003, he was Secretary General of the Spanish Episcopal Conference.

Pope John Paul appointed him Bishop of Córdoba on 28 July 2003.

Pope Benedict XVI named him Coadjutor Archbishop of Seville on 13 November 2008, and he became Archbishop of Seville on 5 November 2009, when Pope Benedict accepted the resignation of his predecessor, Cardinal Carlos Amigo Vallejo.

Pope Francis accepted his resignation on 17 April 2021.

Catholic Church titles
Preceded by Francisco Javier Martínez Fernández	Bishop of Córdoba; 28 July 2003 – 13 November 2008	Succeeded by Demetrio Fernández González
Preceded by Carlos Amigo Vallejo	Archbishop of Seville; 5 November 2009 – 17 April 2021	Succeeded by José Ángel Saiz Meneses
