= San Miguel Church, Oñati =

Church in Onati, Spain

Coordinates: 43.03314°N 2.41391°W

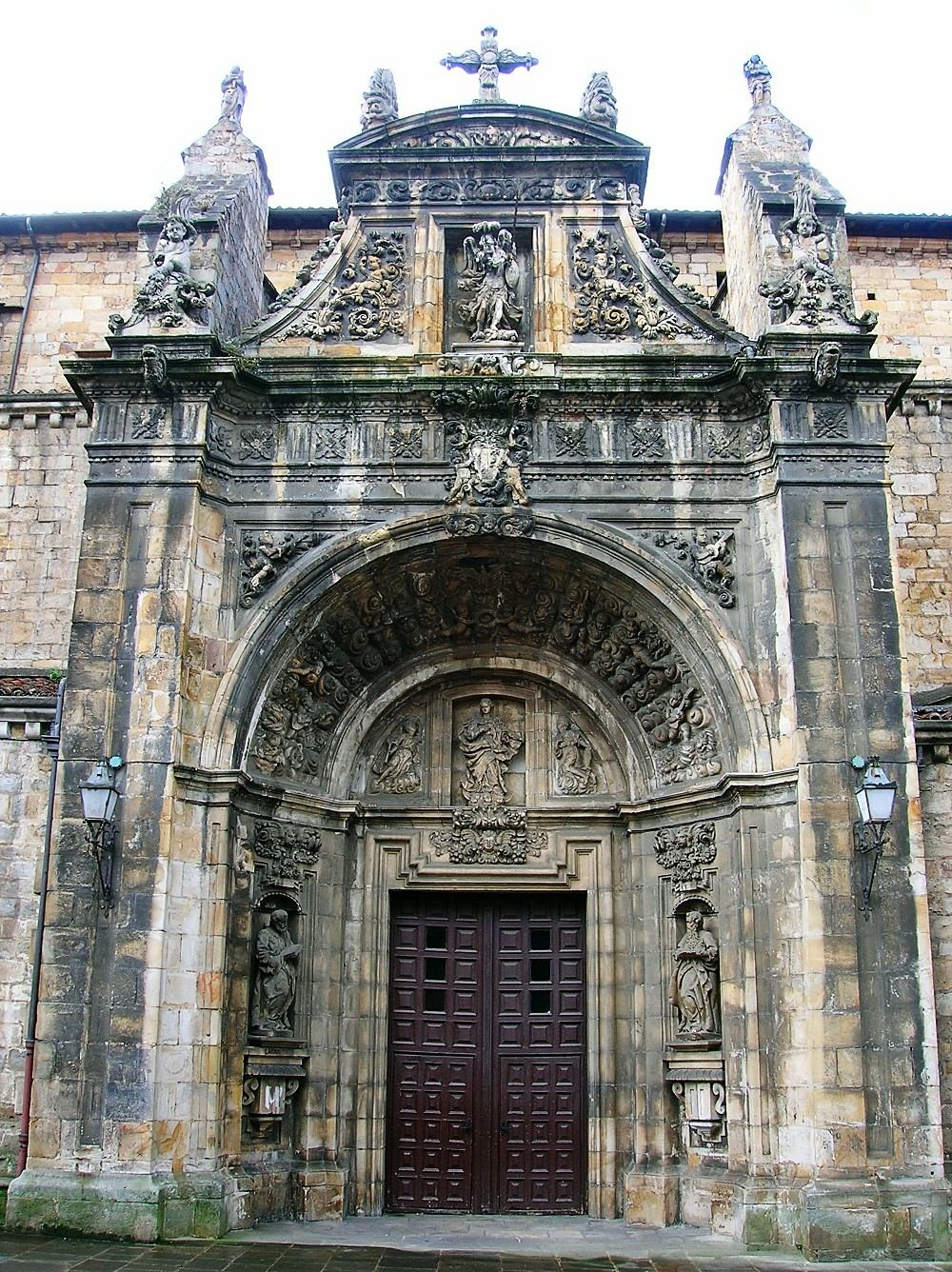
facade

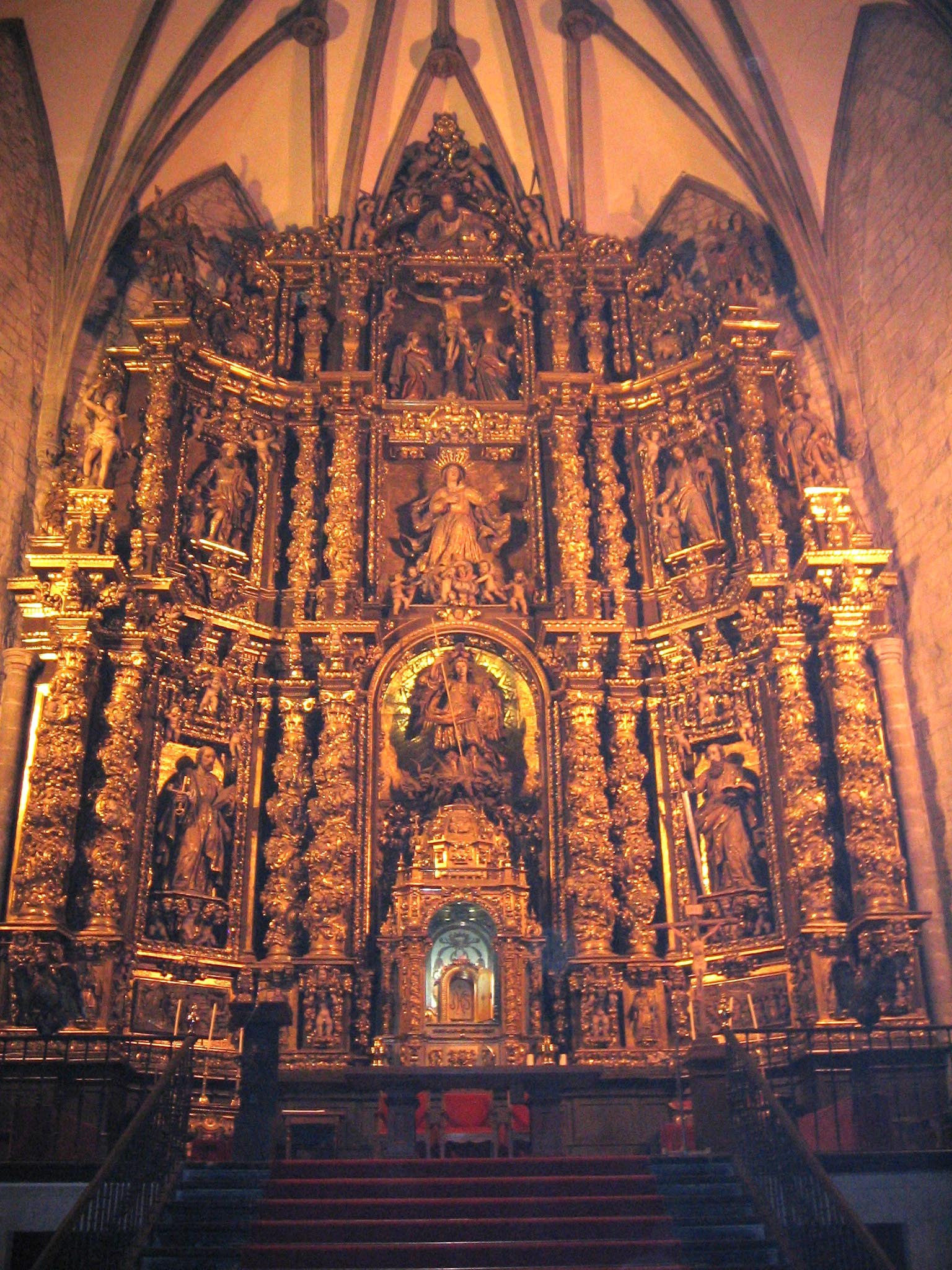
altar

San Miguel Church, Oñati is a Roman Catholic church devoted to Archangel Michael. It is Gothic by design and is located in Oñati, Basque Country, Spain.

== History ==
The original temple dates from the 13th century and consisted of a single nave. In the 15th century two more naves were added, the central one being higher than the lateral ones, this work was promoted by the Lords of Oñate. In the 16th century the bishop of Oñati, Rodrigo Mercado de Zuazola, built the cloister, renovated the chapel of La Piedad to be used as his mausoleum and endowed it with a Renaissance altarpiece. In the 15th century the crypt was built to free the space of the Chapel of the Piedad, attributed to Diego de Siloé. In the 18th century, the main doorway, the main altarpiece and the choir arch, both Baroque were added. Before the end of that century the neoclassical tower was also added.

== Description ==
It is a gothic temple with three naves, the central one higher than the lateral ones. The naves are separated by large cylindrical pillars, with the lateral ones supported by buttresses. The elimination of the dividing walls clears the volume of the building, which is configured as a hall-type church. In the first section of the central nave, supported by a wide carpanel arch, is the choir, with choir stalls and organ. The vaults that cover the elevation are of ribbed vaulting with whitewashed brickwork. Annexed to the nave of the south aisle is the cloister, built in flamboyant gothic style whose street annexed to the church has been integrated as the fourth nave of the same.

The altar is elevated and is accessed by a large staircase, below it is the crypt that was built, raising the main altar, to shelter the burials of the relatives of Pedro Vélez de Guevara, Lord of Oñate, when he sold the rights of the chapel that housed them to Rodrigo Mercado de Zuazola, who raised the Renaissance pulpit, built the Chapel of Mercy and built the cloister.

The tower is neoclassical and is made of light gray limestone contrasting with the work of the rest of the building, is the work of Martin Carrera. Of note is the sculptural finish in the corners of the entablature of the bell tower, where four large full-length sculptures of the Fathers of the Church of the West are placed.
