= Diego Siloe =

Spanish Renaissance architect and sculptor

Diego de Siloé
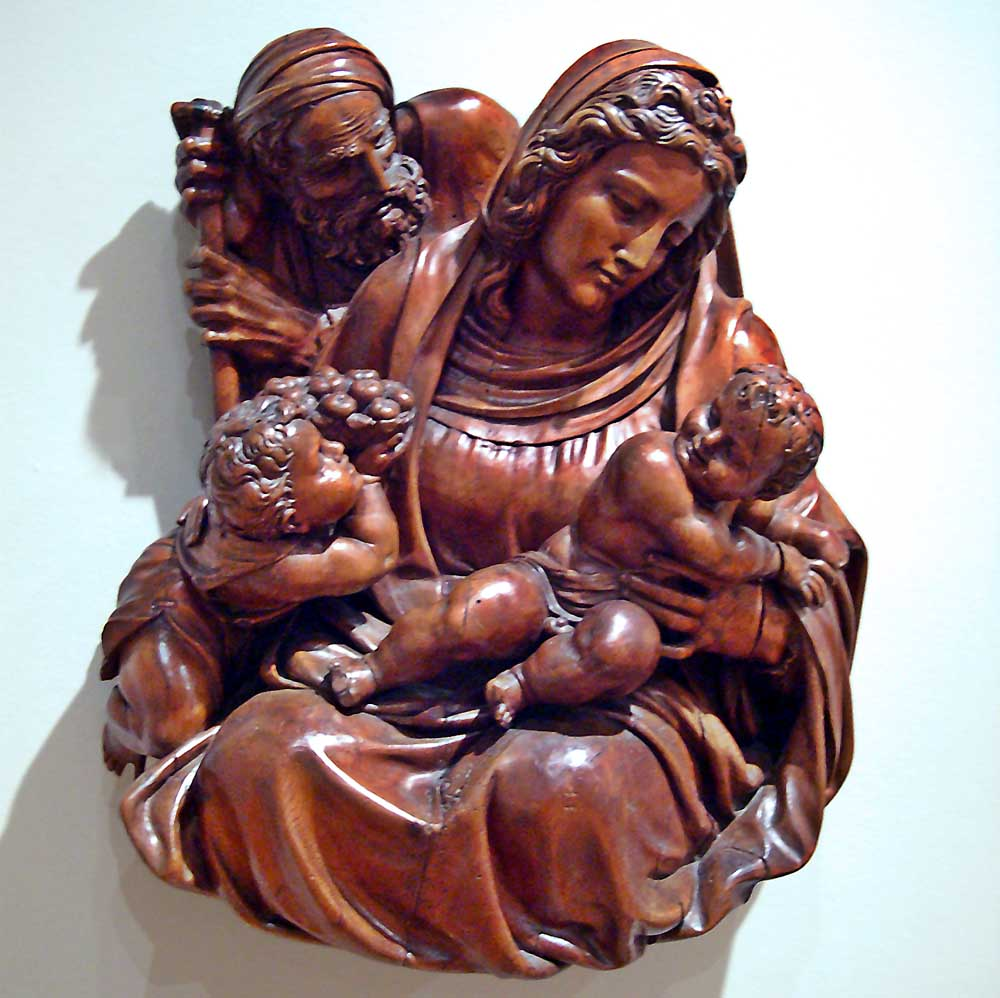
- Holy Family (Sagrada Familia), National Sculpture Museum, Valladolid, Spain.
- Born: Diego de Siloé c. 1495; Burgos, Spain
- Died: 1563; Granada
- Known for: Architecture, Sculpture
- Notable work: Granada Cathedral; Monastery of Saint Jerome (Granada)
- Movement: Plateresque, Spanish Renaissance

Diego Siloe (anglicized) or Diego de Siloé (c. 1495–1563) was a Spanish Renaissance architect and sculptor, progenitor of the Granadan school of sculpture. He developed the majority of his work in Andalusia.

== Biography ==
Siloe was most likely the son of the Spanish-Flemish Gothic sculptor Gil de Siloé. He spent the first part of his artistic career (1519–1528) in his birthplace, Burgos, where he worked principally as a sculptor.

The works of de Siloé combine the Italian Renaissance style that he had studied on a visit to Naples around 1517 with the influences of the Spanish Gothic and of Arab architecture in Spain. During that trip to Italy, he created his earliest known work—the Epiphany altarpiece for the Caracciolo Chapel in the church of San Giovanni a Carbonara in Naples—in collaboration with Bartolomé Ordóñez; specifically, the statue representing Saint Sebastian and the bas-relief of the "Adoration of the Magi". The gilded staircase of the Burgos Cathedral (1519) is his most important work of this period. Its well-proportioned, round and airy structure with sculptures of cherubs, coats of arms, and vegetal ornamentation, occupies an entire wall of the cathedral. With this design, Siloe resolved the problem that the Coronería door of the Cathedral, situated in the north arm of the transept, was level with the street but stood several meters above the floor of the Cathedral. The monumental staircase splits into two sections parallel to the back wall, and incorporates architectural elements of the classicist tradition, in the style of the Italian architect Donato Bramante.

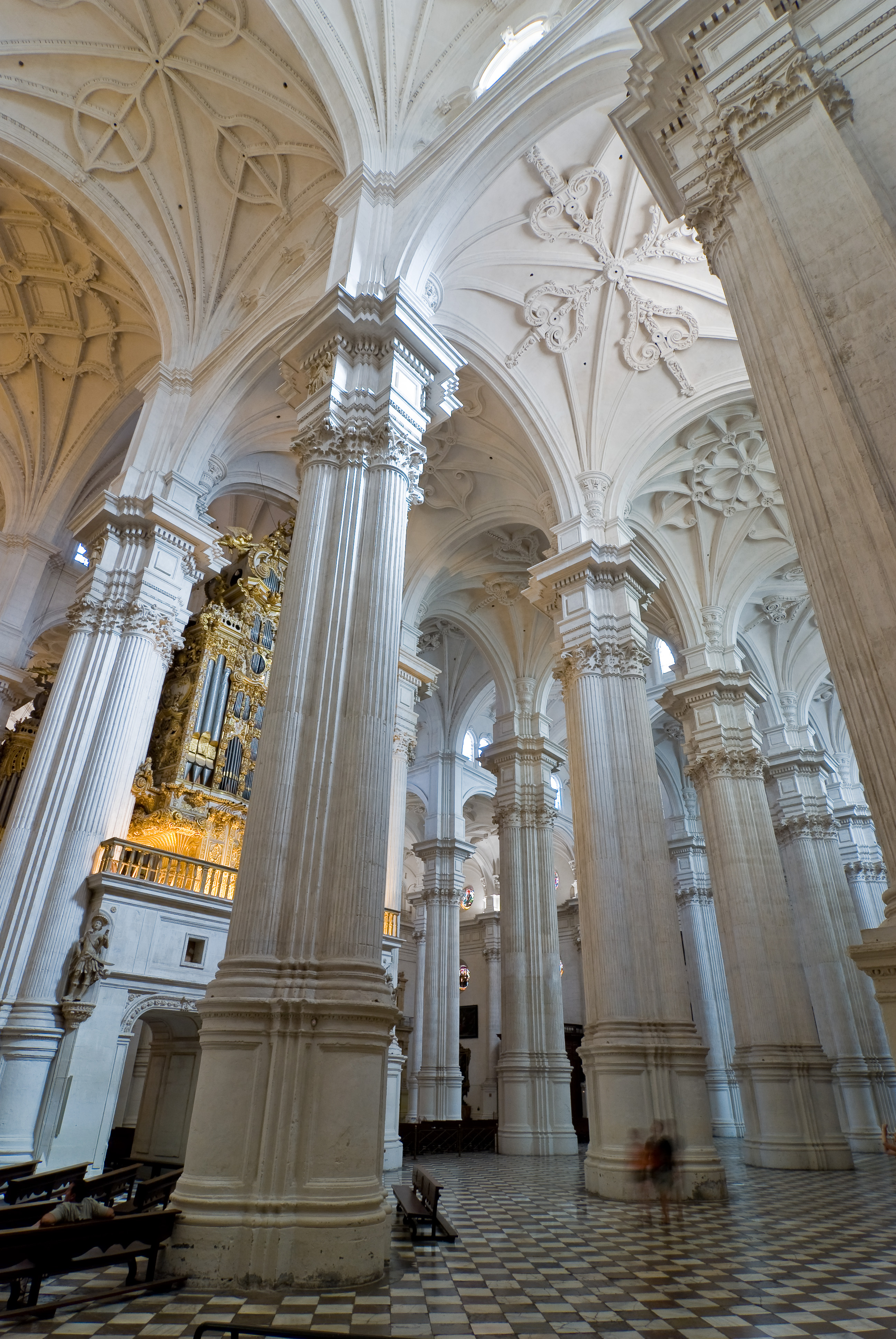
Nave of the Granada Cathedral.

From 1528 until the end of his life, Siloe worked in Granada, above all as an architect. His arrival in the city marks the beginning of classicism in Andalusia. He was commissioned to complete two previously projected projects: the church of the Monastery of Saint Jerome (burial place of the Fernández family of Córdoba, including the tomb of Gonzalo Fernández de Córdoba, "El Gran Capitán") and the Granada Cathedral, which he made into two of the outstanding buildings in the Renaissance style in Spain. The monastery church is distinguished by the immense dome covering its central space, after the fashion of funerary buildings of Ancient Rome. The elevations show references to the work of Filippo Brunelleschi, with large pillars fronted by Corinthian half-columns, matching the height of the naves, with a second body of supports over the entablature of the first. Most outstanding is the Portada del Perdón ("Door of Pardon", c. 1534) conceived as a great triumphal arch. Its rich decoration and the energetic and fluid lines and curves of its interior were an early expression of the Plateresque in Spain.

Among his other most notable projects are the Sacra Capilla de El Salvador del Mundo ("Holy Chapel of the Savior of the World") in Úbeda, conceived as a burial place for the Cobos family. It has a central nave of three wings, side chapels between buttresses, and culminates in a circular space covered by a large dome.

Besides the Cathedral of Granada, de Siloe was the primary architect of the Almería, Málaga and Guadix Cathedrals in Spain, Guadalajara Cathedral in Mexico, and the cathedrals of Lima and Cuzco in Peru. He was also the sculptor of a notable tomb in Spain's Basque Country, the mausoleum of Bishop Rodrigo Mercado de Zuazola, who was president of the chancery of Granada. Carved from white marble, full of grotesque and allegorical scenes, it stands in the chapel of the Piedad in the Church of the Archangel Michael in Oñati.

He died in Granada.

== See also ==
- Spanish Renaissance architecture
- Renaissance architecture
