= Francisco Sánchez de la Fuente =

Spanish Roman Catholic prelate

Most Reverend Francisco Sánchez de la Fuente
- Bishop of Córdoba
- Church: Catholic Church
- Diocese: Córdoba
- In office: 1496–1498
- Predecessor: Iñigo Manrique de Lara
- Successor: Juan Rodríguez de Fonseca
- Previous post: Bishop of Ávila (1493–1496)

Personal details
- Died: September 1498 Córdoba, Spain

Francisco Sánchez de la Fuente (died September 1498) was a Roman Catholic prelate who served as Bishop of Córdoba (1496–1498) and Bishop of Ávila (1493–1496).

== Biography ==
In 1493, Francisco Sánchez de la Fuente was selected by the King of Spain and confirmed by Pope Alexander VI as Bishop of Ávila. In 1496, he was appointed by Pope Alexander VI as Bishop of Córdoba. He served as Bishop of Córdoba until his death in September 1498.

== External links and additional sources ==
- Cheney, David M. "Diocese of Ávila". Catholic-Hierarchy.org. (for Chronology of Bishops) ^{[self-published]}
- Chow, Gabriel. "Diocese of Ávila". GCatholic.org. (for Chronology of Bishops) ^{[self-published]}
- Cheney, David M. "Diocese of Córdoba". Catholic-Hierarchy.org. (for Chronology of Bishops) ^{[self-published]}
- Chow, Gabriel. "Diocese of Córdoba". GCatholic.org. (for Chronology of Bishops) ^{[self-published]}

Catholic Church titles
Preceded by Hernando de Talavera	Bishop of Ávila; 1493–1496	Succeeded by Alfonso Carrillo de Albornoz
Preceded by Iñigo Manrique de Lara	Bishop of Córdoba; 1496–1498	Succeeded by Juan Rodríguez de Fonseca
