= Francisco Ruiz (bishop) =

Spanish Roman Catholic prelate

Most Reverend Francisco Ruiz
- Bishop of Ávila
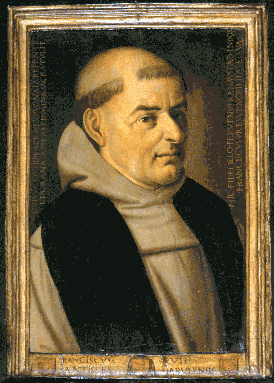
- Church: Catholic Church
- Diocese: Diocese of Ávila
- In office: 1514–1528
- Predecessor: Alfonso Carrillo de Albornoz (bishop)
- Successor: Rodrigo Sánchez Mercado
- Previous post: Bishop of Ciudad Rodrigo (1510–1514)

Personal details
- Born: 1476 Toledo, Spain
- Died: 23 October 1528 (age 52) Ávila, Spain

Francisco Ruiz (1476 – 23 October 1528) was a Roman Catholic prelate who served as Bishop of Ávila (1514–1528) and Bishop of Ciudad Rodrigo (1510–1514).

He was born in Toledo, Spain and ordained a priest in the Order of Friars Minor. On 18 November 1509 he was selected by the King of Spain and confirmed by Pope Julius II as Bishop of Ciudad Rodrigo. On 14 July 1514 he was appointed by the King of Spain and confirmed by Pope Leo X as Bishop of Ávila. He served as Bishop of Ávila until his death, on 23 October 1528.

== External links and additional sources ==
- Cheney, David M. "Diocese of Ávila". Catholic-Hierarchy.org. (for Chronology of Bishops) ^{[self-published]}
- Chow, Gabriel. "Diocese of Ávila". GCatholic.org. (for Chronology of Bishops) ^{[self-published]}
- Cheney, David M. "Diocese of Ciudad Rodrigo". Catholic-Hierarchy.org. (for Chronology of Bishops) ^{[self-published]}
- Chow, Gabriel. "Diocese of Ciudad Rodrigo". GCatholic.org. (for Chronology of Bishops) ^{[self-published]}

Catholic Church titles
Preceded by Francisco Bobadilla	Bishop of Ciudad Rodrigo; 1510–1514	Succeeded by Juan Pardo de Tavera
Preceded by Alfonso Carrillo de Albornoz (bishop)	Bishop of Ávila; 1514–1528	Succeeded by Rodrigo Sánchez Mercado
