= Rodrigo Sánchez Mercado =

Spanish Roman Catholic prelate

Most Reverend Rodrigo Sánchez de Mercado Zuazola
- Bishop of Ávila
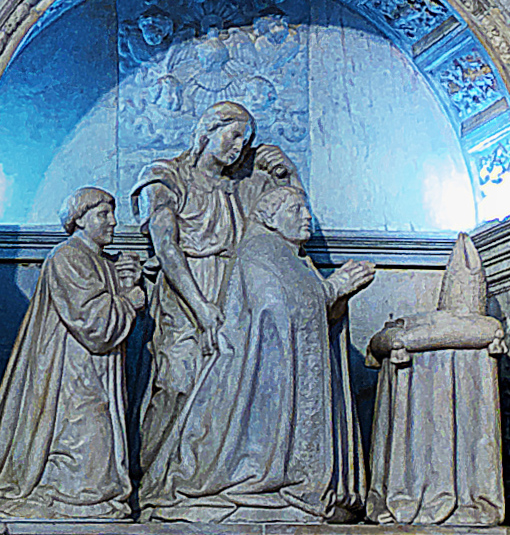
- Tomb of Rodrigo Sánchez Mercado
- Church: Catholic Church
- Diocese: Diocese of Ávila
- In office: 1530–1548
- Predecessor: Francisco Ruiz
- Successor: Diego Alava Esquivel
- Previous post: Bishop of Mallorca (1511–1530)

Personal details
- Died: 25 January 1548 Ávila, Spain

Rodrigo Sánchez de Mercado Zuazola (died 25 January 1548) was a Roman Catholic prelate who served as Bishop of Ávila (1530–1548) and Bishop of Mallorca (1511–1530).

== Biography ==
On 29 October 1511, Rodrigo Sánchez Mercado was selected by the King of Spain and confirmed by Pope Julius II as Bishop of Mallorca.

On 25 April 1525, he was elected president of the Royal Chancery of Granada, but on 25 November 1527, he sent a letter to the King requesting a transfer.

On 12 January 1530, he was appointed by Pope Clement VII as Bishop of Ávila. He served as Bishop of Ávila until his death on 25 January 1548.
He was buried in the Chapel of Our Lady of Mercy in the San Miguel Church, Oñati, attributed to Diego de Siloé.

He was the founder of the University of Oñati (1540) and the College of the Holy Spirit, leaving the former the universal heir of his assets.

== External links and additional sources ==
- Cheney, David M. "Diocese of Mallorca". Catholic-Hierarchy.org. (for Chronology of Bishops) ^{[self-published]}
- Chow, Gabriel. "Diocese of Mallorca (Spain)". GCatholic.org. (for Chronology of Bishops) ^{[self-published]}
- Cheney, David M. "Diocese of Ávila". Catholic-Hierarchy.org. (for Chronology of Bishops) ^{[self-published]}
- Chow, Gabriel. "Diocese of Ávila". GCatholic.org. (for Chronology of Bishops) ^{[self-published]}

Catholic Church titles
Preceded by Diego Ribera de Toledo	Bishop of Mallorca; 1511–1530	Succeeded by Juan Bautista Campeggio
Preceded by Francisco Ruiz	Bishop of Ávila; 1530–1548	Succeeded by Diego Alava Esquivel
