= Lope de Fitero =

Roman Catholic prelate

Most Reverend Lope Fitero
- Bishop of Córdoba
- Church: Catholic Church
- Diocese: Diocese of Córdoba
- In office: 1237–1245

Orders
- Consecration: 9 May 1237 by Juan Domínguez de Medina

Personal details
- Died: 10 June 1245

Lope Fitero (died 10 Jun 1245) was a Roman Catholic prelate who served as Bishop of Córdoba (1237–1245).

== Biography ==
In 1237, Lope Fitero was appointed by Pope Gregory IX as Bishop of Córdoba. On 9 May 1237, he was consecrated bishop by Juan Domínguez de Medina, Bishop of Burgos. He served as Bishop of Córdoba until his death on 10 Jun 1245.

== External links and additional sources ==
- Cheney, David M. "Diocese of Córdoba". Catholic-Hierarchy.org. (for Chronology of Bishops)^{self-published}
- Chow, Gabriel. "Diocese of Córdoba". GCatholic.org. (for Chronology of Bishops)^{self-published}
