= Chronica latina regum Castellae =

Medieval Latin history of the rulers of Castile

The Chronica latina regum Castellae, known in Spanish as the Crónica latina de los reyes de Castilla, both meaning "Latin Chronicle of the Kings of Castile", is a medieval Latin history of the rulers of Castile from the death of Count Fernán González in 970 to the reconquest of Córdoba by King Ferdinand III in 1236–39. It was probably composed by Juan de Soria, the Bishop of Osma and chancellor of Ferdinand III, between 1217 and 1239. The majority of the text deals with the reigns of Alfonso VIII (1158–1214) and Ferdinand III (1217–1252). It was designed with two purposes: for use at the royal court as a speculum principis and to defend the interests of Castile against those of the Kingdom of León.

The Chronica originally ended in 1230 with the death of Alfonso IX of León, who was succeeded by Ferdinand III. Modern historians disagree whether the continuation down to the capture of Córdoba six years later was written by Juan de Soria or by another author. One has even suggested a composition in three stages between 1223 and 1237 by the same author, Juan de Soria. The sources of the Chronica were the documents of the royal archives, to which its author had access, although he also records events from memory. He makes little use of other narrative histories, which were the main sources of the contemporary chronicles called Chronicon mundi and De rebus Hispaniae. Juan also includes contemporaneous events from the Maghrib, the Byzantine Empire, and the Kingdom of France to place Castilian history in context, something neither the Chronicon nor the De rebus do, although the later histories composed at the request of Alfonso X, the Grande e general estoria and the Estoria de España do.

The Chronica is preserved in only one late fifteenth-century manuscript, MS G-1 or 9/450, in the library of the Real Academia de la Historia in Madrid. It is a copy of the original and is found on folios 89 through 122. The structure found in most printed editions, of four sections subdivided into chapters, was added by its first editor, Georges Cirot.

== Editions ==
- Georges Cirot, ed. "Chronique latine des rois de Castille jusqu'en 1236", Bulletin hispanique, 14 (1912), 30–46, 109–18, 244–74, 353–74; 15 (1913), 18–87, 268–83, 411–27. (editio princeps)
- Luis Charlo Brea, ed. Crónica latina de los reyes de Castilla. Cádiz: Universidad, 1984. ISBN 978-84-600-3487-2
- María D. Cabanes Pecourt, ed. Crónica latina de los reyes de Castilla. Zaragoza: Anubar, 1985. ISBN 978-84-7013-211-7
- Luis Charlo Brea, ed. "Chronica latina regum castellae". Chronica hispana saeculi XIII, Corpus Christianorum. Continuatio Mediaevalis. Brussels: Brepols, 1997. pp. 7–118.
- Luis Charlo Brea, trans. Crónica latina de los reyes de Castilla. Clásicos latinos medievales, 8. Madrid: Akal, 1999. ISBN 978-84-460-0919-1
- Crónica Latina de los reyes de Castilla in Spanish online.
