= Alfonso Carrillo de Albornoz (bishop) =

Roman Catholic prelate

Most Reverend Alfonso Carrillo de Albornoz
- Bishop of Ávila
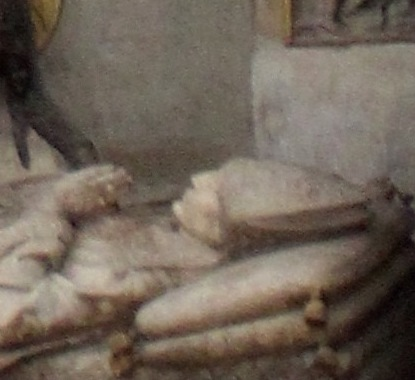
- Tomb of Alonso Carrillo
- Church: Catholic Church
- Diocese: Diocese of Ávila
- In office: 1496–1498
- Predecessor: Francisco Sánchez de la Fuente
- Successor: Francisco Ruiz
- Previous post: Bishop of Catania (1486–1496)

Personal details
- Died: 14 June 1514 Ávila, Spain

Alfonso Carrillo de Albornoz (also Alonso Carrillo de Albornoz) (died 14 June 1514) was a Roman Catholic prelate who served as Bishop of Ávila (1496–1498) and Bishop of Catania (1486–1496).

== Biography ==
On 8 November 1486, Alfonso Carrillo de Albornoz was selected by the King of Spain and confirmed by Pope Innocent VIII as Bishop of Catania. On 27 June 1496, he was appointed by Pope Alexander VI as Bishop of Ávila. He served as Bishop of Ávila until his death on 14 June 1514.

== External links and additional sources ==
- Cheney, David M. "Archdiocese of Catania". Catholic-Hierarchy.org. (for Chronology of Bishops) ^{[self-published]}
- Chow, Gabriel. "Metropolitan Archdiocese of Catania". GCatholic.org. (for Chronology of Bishops) ^{[self-published]}
- Cheney, David M. "Diocese of Ávila". Catholic-Hierarchy.org. (for Chronology of Bishops) ^{[self-published]}
- Chow, Gabriel. "Diocese of Ávila". GCatholic.org. (for Chronology of Bishops) ^{[self-published]}

Catholic Church titles
Preceded by Bernardo Margarit	Bishop of Catania; 1486–1496	Succeeded by Juan Daza
Preceded by Francisco Sánchez de la Fuente	Bishop of Ávila; 1496–1498	Succeeded by Francisco Ruiz
