= Gonzalo de Illescas (bishop) =

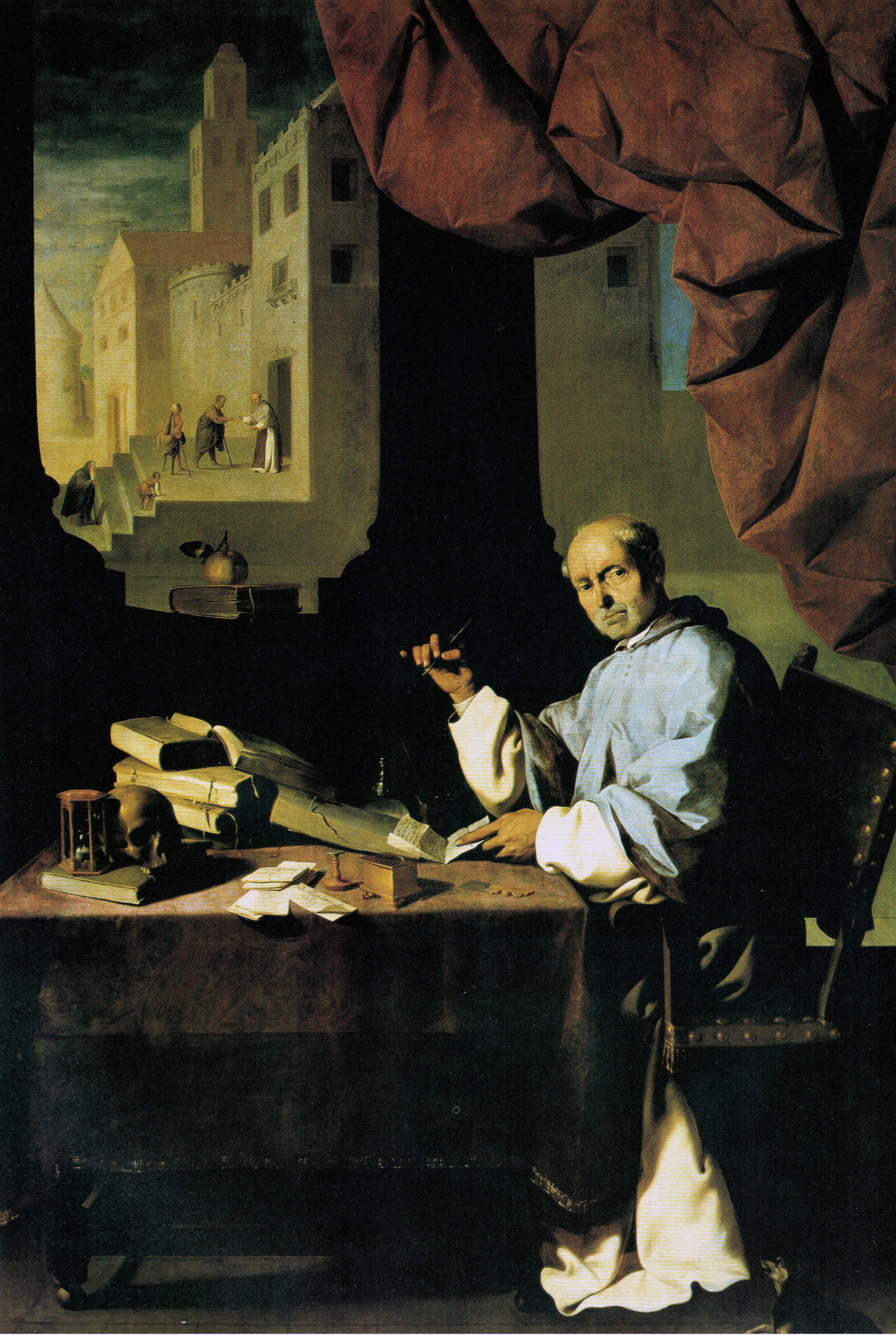
Gonzalo in his study, as painted by Zurbarán (1639)

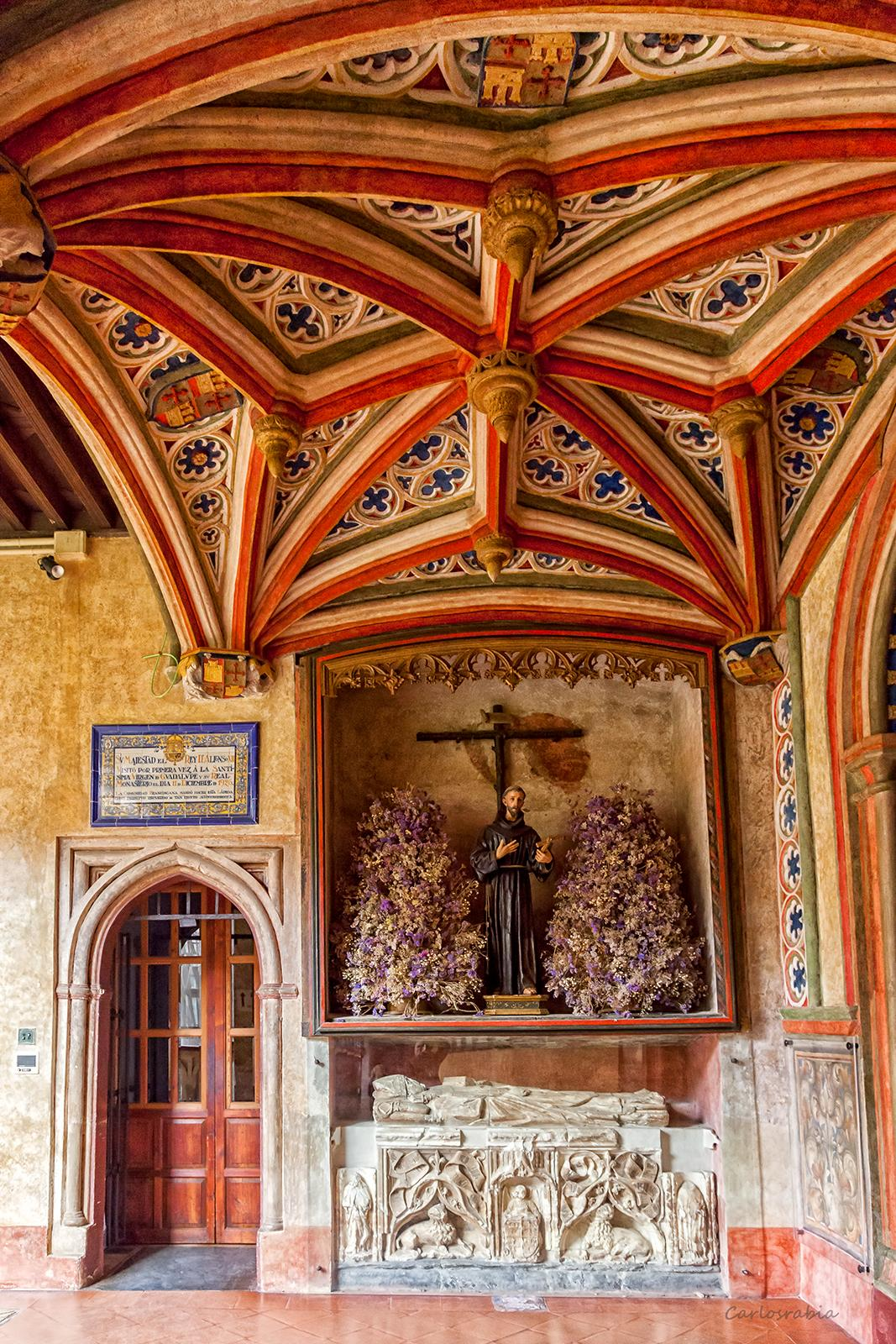
Funerary chapel of Gonzalo, designed by Egas Cueman (1458–1460)

Gonzalo de Illescas (died 22 October 1464) was a Hieronymite monk, an advisor to King John II of Castile from 1435 until 1454 and the bishop of Córdoba from 1454 until his death.

== Royal advisor ==
Gonzalo was born early in the 15th century in Illescas in the archdiocese of Toledo. He was a relative of Archbishop Gutierre Álvarez of Toledo, through whom he obtained several privileges for the monastery of Saint Mary of Guadalupe, where he was a monk. In 1435, the monastery was visited by King John II and Queen Mary, whose confessor at the time was the prior, Pedro de las Cabañuelas. The royal couple was impressed by Gonzalo and he was able to obtain several royal privileges for the monastery.

Gonzalo was the prior of Guadalupe between 1441 and 1444. In 1449, owing to the frequent absences of his confessor, Lope de Barrientos, King John appointed Gonzalo to the position. He was only at court for a year. From 1450 to 1453, he was again prior of Guadalupe. Following the execution of Duke Álvaro de Luna in 1453, he became a member of the royal council and one of the king's important advisors. He attended the Cortes of 1453. With the king's death approaching in 1454, he and Lope de Barrientos took over the administration.

John II had been administering the Order of Santiago since the vacancy of its mastership caused by the death of Álvaro de Luna. After his death, the young prince Alfonso was recognized as administrator of the order, but with actual power exercised by Gonzalo de Illescas, Lope de Barrientos and Juan de Padilla.

== Bishop of Córdoba ==
Before his death, John II had proposed Gonzalo for the diocese of Córdoba. The bulls confirming his election came on 16 August 1454. As bishop he continued to visit his monastery and favoured it and other Hieronymite houses with alms. He ordered the construction works at Guadalupe, including the library and his own funeral chapel. The chapel, in a style inspired by Rogier van der Weyden, was the work of Egas Cueman between 1458 and 1460.

In 1455, he received a bull from Pope Nicholas V permitting him to keep two Hieronymites with him so as to live according to the Hieronymite rule insofar as his episcopal office allowed. He was known for opening the episcopal palace to the poor.

Gonzalo died on 22 October 1464 in Hornachuelos. He was buried in the chapel he had built at Guadalupe. His sarcophagus was carved by Cueman. According to his will, Gonzalo left behind a library of 150 books. He was twice depicting in artwork by great masters. Francisco de Zurbarán made a painting of Gonzalo for Guadalupe in 1639, while Juan de Valdés Leal made one for the monastery of San Jerónimo de Buenavista, today in the Museum of Fine Arts of Seville.
