= Esteban L. Olmedo =

Organizational psychologist

Esteban Olmedo
- Occupation: Psychologist
- Awards: APA Division 45 Lifetime Distinguished Contribution Award

Academic background
- Education: Baylor University

Esteban L. Olmedo is an organizational psychologist who conducted research on acculturation, ethnic minority issues, and mental health. Olmedo was the inaugural director of the Ethnicity, Race, and Cultural Affairs Portfolio (later known as the Office of Ethnic Minority Affairs) at the American Psychological Association (APA).

In 1984, Olmedo was appointed to the Task Force on the Structure of APA. He was then selected to be the founding President of APA Division 45, the Society for the Psychological Study of Ethnic Minority Issues (now known as the Society for the Psychological Study of Culture, Ethnicity and Race), where he was involved in defining and developing organizational characteristics, structure and functions of a new division.

== Biography ==
Olmedo was born in the United States and raised in Argentina. He returned to the United States for college, attending Baylor University where he earned a Bachelor of Arts in psychology and philosophy in 1967 and a Ph.D. in experimental psychology in 1972.

Olmedo began his academic career teaching at the California State University at San Bernardino. Olmedo was appointed as the Director of the APA Office of Ethnic Minority Affairs around 1978. At the time of his appointment to the APA, Olmedo had been working as the associate director of the Spanish Speaking Mental Health Research Center at the University of California, Los Angeles.

After leaving his position at the APA, Olmedo served as vice president for Academic Affairs at the California School of Professional Psychology. In 2001, Olmedo retired from academia, and subsequently worked as a financial manager at Randall Foods Inc.

Olmedo was honored with the APA Division 45 Lifetime Achievement Award in 1996. He had previously received the APA Division 45 Distinguished Career Contributions to Service Award.

== Books ==
- Newton, F. C. R., Olmedo, E. L., & Padilla, A. M. (1982). Hispanic mental health research: A reference guide. University of California Press.

== Representative publications ==
- Olmedo, E. L. (1979). Acculturation: A psychometric perspective. American Psychologist, 34(11), 1061–1070.
- Olmedo, E. L. (1981). Testing linguistic minorities. American Psychologist, 36(10), 1078–1085.
- Olmedo, E. L., Martinez Jr, J. L., & Martinez, S. R. (1978). Measure of acculturation for Chicano adolescents. Psychological Reports, 42(1), 159–170.
- Olmedo, E. L., & Padilla, A. M. (1978). Empirical and construct validation of a measure of acculturation for Mexican Americans. The Journal of Social Psychology, 105(2), 179–187.
- Padilla, A. M., & Olmedo, E. (2009). Synopsis of key persons, events, and associations in the history of Latino psychology. Cultural Diversity and Ethnic Minority Psychology, 15(4), 363–373.
