= Sebastián de Olmedo =

Sebastián de Olmedo was a contemporary Spanish chronicler during the early stages of the Spanish Inquisition. He is credited with describing Tomás de Torquemada as "The hammer of heretics, the light of Spain, the saviour of his country, the honour of his order."

== See also ==
- Tomás de Torquemada
