= Juan Rodríguez de Fonseca =

Spanish archbishop, courtier and bureaucrat (1451–1524)

- Archbishop of Rossano
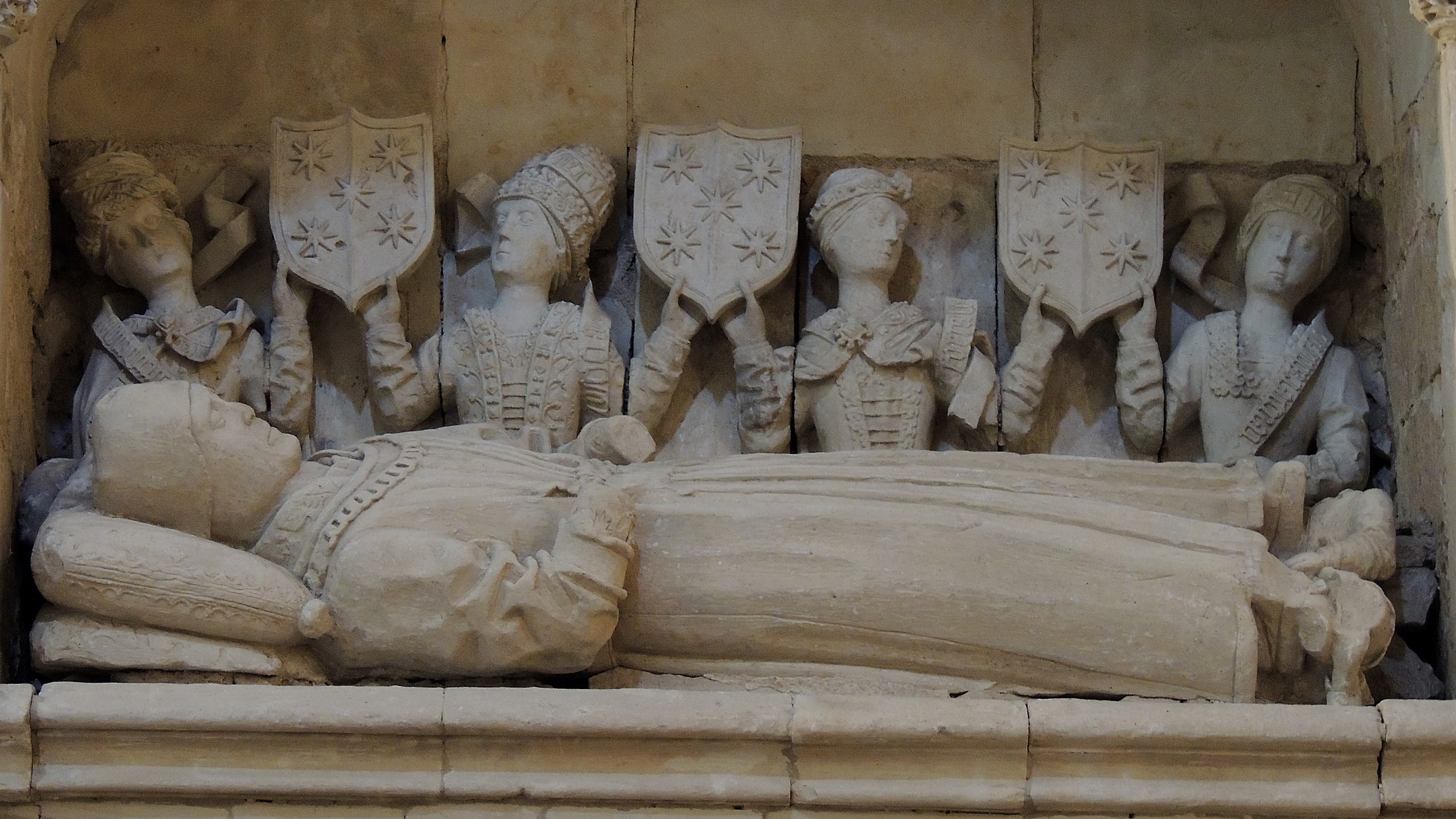
- Archdiocese: Rossano
- See: Rossano
- Appointed: 20 June 1519
- Term ended: 12 November 1524
- Predecessor: Bernardino López de Carvajal
- Successor: Vincenzo Pimpinella
- Other post: Bishop of Burgos
- Previous posts: Bishop of Badajoz (1495–1499); Bishop of Córdoba (1499–1504); Bishop of Palencia (1504–1514)

Personal details
- Born: 1451 Toro
- Died: 12 November 1524 (aged 72–73) Burgos
- Denomination: Roman Catholic

Juan Rodríguez de Fonseca (1451–1524) was a Spanish archbishop, a courtier and bureaucrat, whose position as royal chaplain to Queen Isabella enabled him to become a powerful counsellor to Ferdinand and Isabella, the Catholic Monarchs. He controlled the Casa de Contratación, an agency which managed expeditions to the New World on behalf of the Spanish crown. He later served as the president of the Council of the Indies, when it was founded in 1521. He managed the administration of a number of significant Spanish expeditions including voyages by Christopher Columbus and Magellan's circumnavigation of the Earth.

== Early life ==
Rodríguez de Fonseca was born in 1451 in his family's castle in the town of Toro, in the Province of Zamora, the son of Fernando de Fonseca, lord of the towns of Coca and Alaejos, one of his three children with Teresa de Ayala, daughter of the Marquis of Cañete. The family had originated in Portugal and migrated to the Kingdom of Castile a century earlier. As younger sons, he and his brother, Alonso de Fonseca y Acevedo, were destined for careers in the Church. He was the nephew of Alonso de Fonseca y Ulloa, Archbishop of Seville. In the dispute over the claim to the throne between Isabella of Castile and Joanna la Beltraneja, the family pledged their loyalty to Isabella, and helped her to ascend to the throne.

With gratitude for his services in this struggle, the young queen recommended Rodríguez de Fonseca to her confessor, the Hieronymite monk, Hernando de Talavera, to educate him in theology and the humanities.

Rodríguez de Fonseca was ordained a priest on 6 April 1493 in the bishop's palace in Barcelona. He was quickly elected by the cathedral chapter of Seville to join them as a canon of the cathedral. He was soon appointed Dean of the cathedral. He later served as Vicar General of the archdiocese. Additionally he held the office of Archdeacon for Olmedo, Ávila and Seville.

== Control of New Spain ==
The sovereigns entrusted Rodríguez de Fonseca with building a colonial administration from as early as Columbus’ second voyage in 1493, which he organized. From that date he gained increasing influence over Castilian colonial policy and emerged as the kingdom’s de facto Minister of Colonial Affairs.

Rodríguez de Fonseca clashed early with Columbus who, he believed, was asserting too much independence from royal authority, and in 1499 Queen Isabella, influenced by him, removed Columbus as governor of the newly found lands overseas. Rodríguez de Fonseca then began to plan and organize a series of voyages, under such captains as Alonso de Ojeda, Vicente Yáñez Pinzón, Diego de Lepe, and Rodrigo de Bastidas, which steadily expanded new discoveries and increased understanding of the islands and mainland of what quickly became known as a New World.

In 1503 Rodríguez de Fonseca organized and supervised an important new institution called the Casa de Contratación, which assumed major responsibilities over the management of the new overseas settlements. He also took the leading role in the evolving Council of the Indies (formally established in 1524), which in time became the most influential royal institution governing the new settlements. Upon the death of Queen Isabella in 1504, an aging King Ferdinand allowed Fonseca almost unlimited scope in administering the overseas colonies.

Rodríguez de Fonseca was successively named Bishop of Badajoz (1495), of Córdoba (1499), of Palencia (1504), and, finally, of Burgos (1514), one of Castile’s wealthiest dioceses. In 1519 he was also named Archbishop of Rossano in the Kingdom of Naples. He was named Count of La Pernía by the monarchs. In 1513 King Ferdinand had asked the pope to elevate Rodríguez to a new title, that of Patriarch of the West Indies, a position that would bring a cardinal’s red hat. But the papacy was reluctant to create this title and the patriarchate was not created until shortly after Fonseca's death.

Upon Ferdinand’s death in 1516, Rodríguez de Fonseca continued his work under the new sovereign, King Charles I. He did not enjoy, however, the same confidence he had under the previous monarchs. He rounded off his career by sponsoring and organizing the epic voyage of Ferdinand Magellan, the first one to circumnavigate the globe.

Over his long career, Rodríguez de Fonseca inevitably made many enemies, most notably the Dominican bishop, Bartolomé de las Casas, known as the Protector of the Indians, who denounced him for his indifference to the cruelties that Spanish settlers inflicted on the native population of the new lands: when told that 7,000 children had been slaughtered in Cuba in three months, he is said to have retorted "and how does that concern me?" He also clashed with Hernán Cortés, conqueror of Mexico, which led to Cortés' removal from office in 1523.

== Death ==
Rodríguez de Fonseca died in Burgos, where he was still bishop, on 4 March 1524. He was buried at the Church of Santa María la Mayor en Coca in Segovia, where his tomb still exists.
