= Llano de Olmedo =

Coordinates: 41°16′N 4°37′W

Llano de Olmedo, Spain
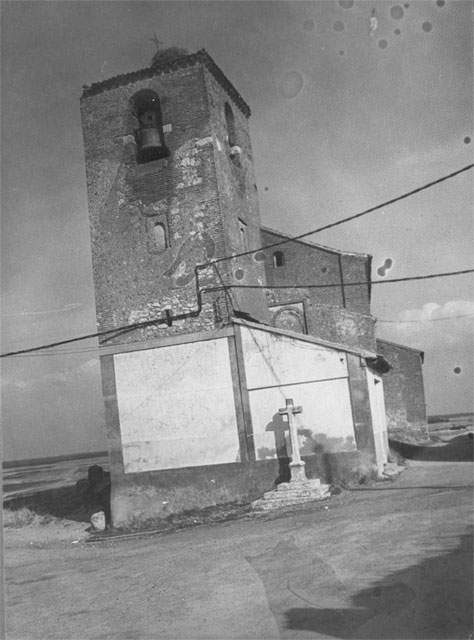
- Church of San Pedro
- Country: Spain
- Autonomous community: Castile and León
- Province: Valladolid
- Municipality: Llano de Olmedo

Area
  - Total: 15.22 km^{2} (5.88 sq mi)
- Elevation: 777 m (2,549 ft)

Population (2025-01-01)
  - Total: 49
  - Density: 3.2/km^{2} (8.3/sq mi)
- Time zone: UTC+1 (CET)
  - Summer (DST): UTC+2 (CEST)

Llano de Olmedo is a municipality located in the province of Valladolid, Castile and León, Spain. According to the 2004 census (INE), the municipality had a population of 82 inhabitants.
