= Monastery of San Jerónimo de Buenavista, Seville =

Former monastery in Andalusia, Spain

Coordinates: 37.423675°N 5.986539°W

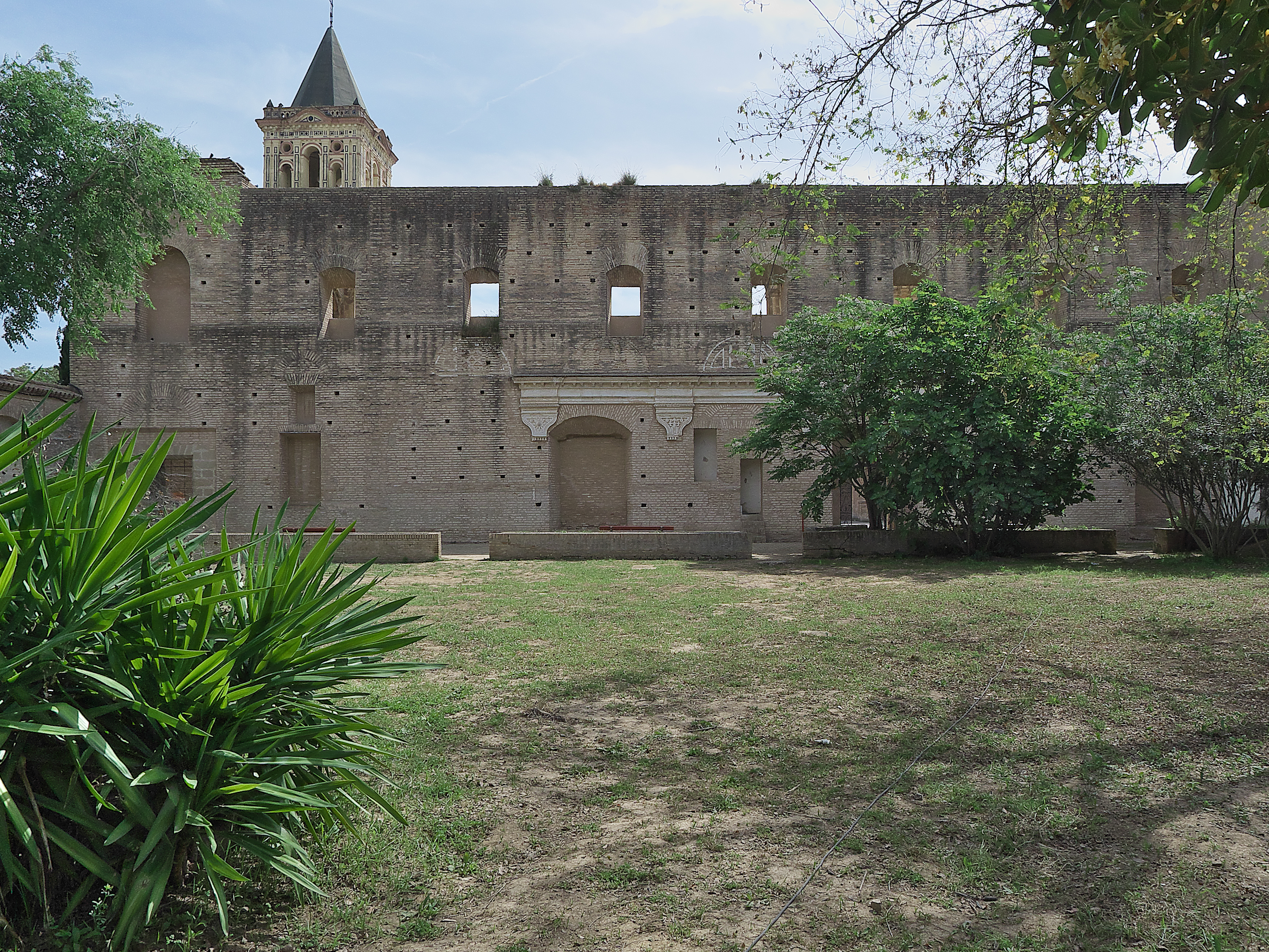
Monastery of San Jerónimo de Buenavista

Monastery of San Jerónimo de Buenavista is a former monastery located in the San Jerónimo neighborhood of Seville, Andalusia, Spain. It was founded in 1414 by Father Diego Martínez de Medina. On 27 August 1964, it was declared a Historical-Artistic Monument. In 1966, it was bought by Carmen Iglesias Zubiada, who turned it into a private residence. In 1984, it was acquired by the Seville City Council. In 2015, it was turned into a neighborhood civic center.
