= Iñigo Manrique de Lara (bishop of Córdoba) =

Spanish Roman Catholic prelate (died 1496)

Most Reverend Iñigo Manrique de Lara
- Bishop of Córdoba
- Church: Catholic Church
- Diocese: Diocese of Córdoba
- In office: 1485–1496
- Predecessor: Luis de Velasco
- Successor: Francisco Sánchez de la Fuente
- Previous post: Bishop of León (1484–1485)

Personal details
- Died: 1496 Córdoba, Spain

Iñigo Manrique de Lara (died 1496) was a Roman Catholic prelate who served as Bishop of Córdoba (1485–1496) and Bishop of León (1484–1485).

== Biography ==
He was the second son of Pedro Manrique, Lord of Ezcaray, and his first wife, Isabel de Quiñones. Destined, like many young noblemen, for a career in the Church, his influential family and the patronage of his uncle and namesake Iñigo Manrique de Lara , who would become Archbishop of Seville, ensured him a brilliant future in both the Church and the administration.

In 1484, Iñigo Manrique de Lara was appointed during the papacy of Pope Sixtus IV as Bishop of León. In 1485, he was appointed during the papacy of Pope Innocent VIII as Bishop of Córdoba. He served as Bishop of Córdoba until his death in 1496.

== External links and additional sources ==
- Cheney, David M. "Diocese of León". Catholic-Hierarchy.org. (for Chronology of Bishops) ^{[self-published]}
- Chow, Gabriel. "Diocese of León". GCatholic.org. (for Chronology of Bishops) ^{[self-published]}
- Cheney, David M. "Diocese of Córdoba". Catholic-Hierarchy.org. (for Chronology of Bishops) ^{[self-published]}
- Chow, Gabriel. "Diocese of Córdoba". GCatholic.org. (for Chronology of Bishops) ^{[self-published]}

Catholic Church titles
| Preceded by Luis de Velasco | Bishop of León; 1484–1485 | Succeeded by Alonso de Valdivieso |
| Preceded by Luis de Velasco | Bishop of Córdoba; 1485–1496 | Succeeded by Francisco Sánchez de la Fuente |
