= Diocese of Ávila =

Roman Catholic diocese in Spain

Coordinates: 40.6558°N 4.6971°W

Diocese of Ávila Dioecesis Abulensis Diócesis de Ávila

Catholic
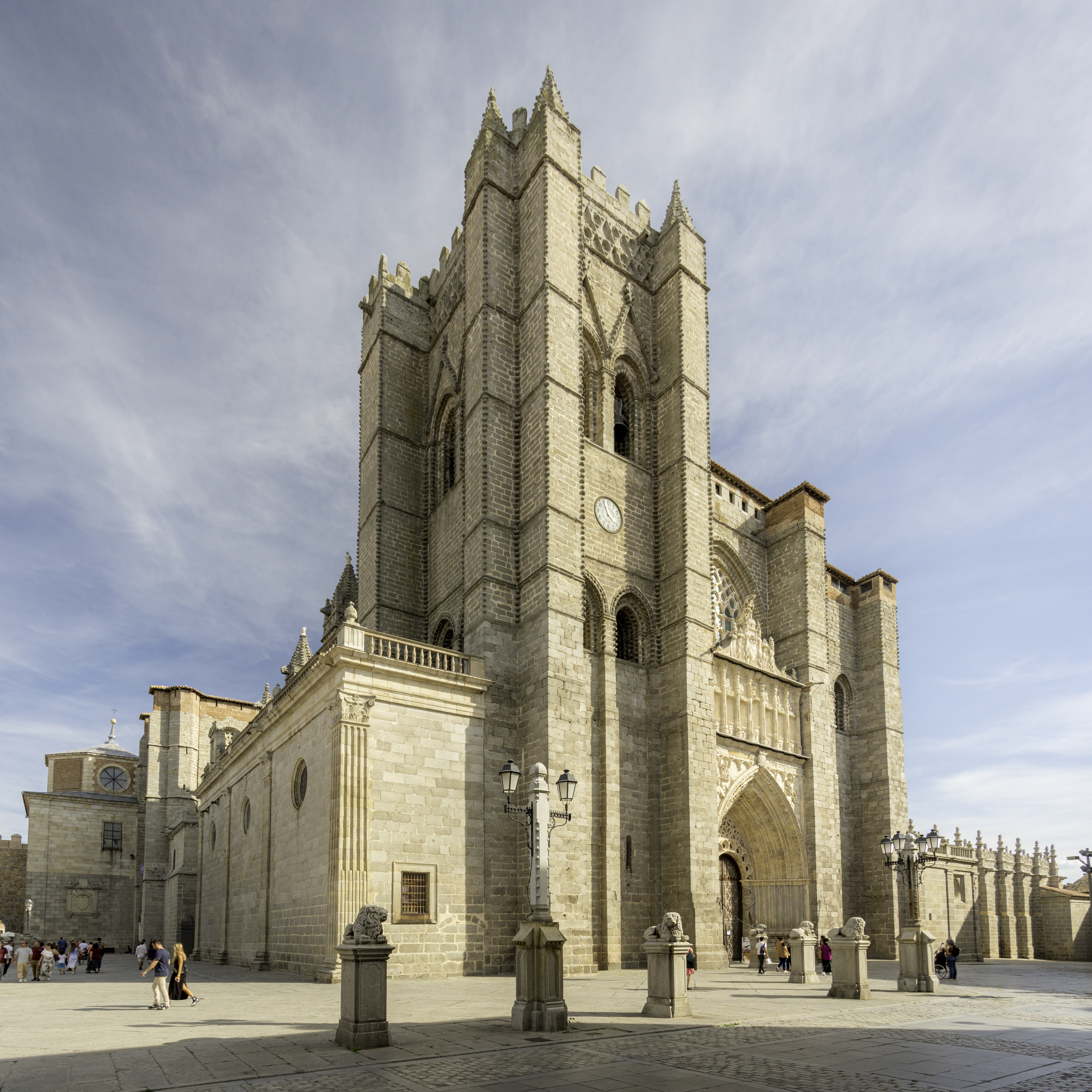
- Ávila Cathedral

Location
- Country: Spain
- Ecclesiastical province: Valladolid
- Metropolitan: Valladolid

Statistics
- Area: 8,048 km^{2} (3,107 sq mi)
- Population: Total; Catholics: (as of 2012); 172,804; 170,110 (98.4%)

Information
- Rite: Latin Rite
- Established: 1100
- Cathedral: Cathedral of the Saviour in Ávila

Current leadership
- Pope: Leo XIV
- Bishop: Jesús Rico García
- Metropolitan Archbishop: Luis Javier Argüello García

Map

Website
- Website of the Diocese

The Diocese of Ávila (Latin: Dioecesis Abulensis) is a Latin diocese of the Catholic Church located in the city of Ávila in the ecclesiastical province of Valladolid in Spain.

== History ==
- 1102–1120: Administered by Jerome, bishop of Salamanca
- 1121: Established as Diocese of Ávila

== Leadership ==
- Priscillian (first Christian beheaded for heresy, 385)

=== Bishops of Ávila after 1381 ===
- Domingo Suárez, O.F.M. (30 Jul 1263 – 1271 Died)
- Diego de los Roeles (1381–1394)
- Alfonso de Echea o de Córdoba (1395–1403)
- Juan Rodríguez de Guzmán (1403–1424)
- Diego Gómez de Fuensalida (1424–1436)
- Cardinal Juan de Cervantes (1437 – 19 August 1441, Appointed Bishop of Segovia)
- Lope de Barrientos, O.P. (19 Jul 1441 – 7 Apr 1445 Appointed, Bishop of Cuenca)
- Alonso de Fonseca y Ulloa (1445 – 4 Feb 1454 Appointed, Archbishop of Sevilla)
- Alonso Fernández de Madrigal (1454–1455)
- Martín Fernández de Vilches (1455–1469)
- Alfonso de Fonseca (29 Jan 1469 – 26 Aug 1485 Appointed, Bishop of Cuenca)
- Hernando de Talavera, O.S.H. (26 Aug 1485 – 23 Jan 1493 Appointed, Archbishop of Granada)
- Francisco Sánchez de la Fuente (1493 – 1496 Appointed, Bishop of Córdoba)
- Alfonso Carrillo de Albornoz (bishop) (27 Jun 1496 – 14 Jun 1514 Died)
- Francisco Ruiz (bishop), O.F.M. (14 Jul 1514 – 23 Oct 1528 Died)
- Rodrigo Sánchez Mercado (12 Jan 1530 – 25 Jan 1548 Died)
- Diego Alava Esquivel (7 May 1548 – 21 Oct 1558 Appointed, Bishop of Córdoba)
- Diego de los Cobos Molina (2 Aug 1559 – 4 Sep 1560 Appointed, Bishop of Jaén)
- Alvaro Hurtado de Mendoza y Sarmiento (4 Sep 1560 – 11 Sep 1577 Appointed, Bishop of Palencia)
- Sancho Busto de Villegas (5 Nov 1578 – 19 Jan 1581 Died)
- Pedro Fernández Temiño (11 Sep 1581 – 29 Aug 1590 Died)
- Jerónimo Manrique de Lara (5 Apr 1591 – 1 Sep 1595 Died)
- Juan Velázquez de las Cuevas, O.P. (29 Apr 1596 – 11 Mar 1598 Died)
- Lorenzo Asensio Otaduy Avendaño (1 Feb 1599 – 4 Dec 1611 Died)
- Juan Alvarez de Caldas (14 May 1612 – 30 Nov 1615 Died)
- Francisco González Zarate (de Gamarra) (30 May 1616 – 13 Dec 1626 Died)
- Alfonso López Gallo (5 Jul 1627 Appointed, not installed)
- Francisco Márquez Gaceta (29 Nov 1627 – 8 Nov 1631 Died)
- Pedro Cifuentes Loarte (7 Jun 1632 – 19 May 1636 Died)
- Diego Arce Reinoso (22 Mar 1638 – 8 Oct 1640 Confirmed, Bishop of Palencia)
- Juan Vélez de Valdivielso (25 Feb 1641 – 21 Aug 1645 Appointed, Bishop of Cartagena (en España))
- José de Argáiz Pérez (4 Dec 1645 – 27 Jul 1654 Appointed, Archbishop of Granada)
- Bernardo Atayde de Lima Perera (5 Oct 1654 – 17 Feb 1656 Died)
- Martín de Bonilla Granada (16 Oct 1656 – 21 Oct 1662 Died)
- Francisco de Rojas-Borja y Artés (23 Apr 1663 – 29 May 1673 Appointed, Archbishop (Personal Title) of Cartagena (en España))
- Juan Asensio Barrios, O. de M. (26 Jun 1673 – 20 Apr 1682 Appointed, Bishop of Jaén)
- Diego Ventura Fernández de Angulo, O.F.M. (11 Jan 1683 – 17 Mar 1700 Died)
- Gregorio Solórzano Castillo (10 May 1700 – 17 Jul 1703 Died)
- Baltasar de la Peña Avilés (17 Dec 1703 – 7 Feb 1705 Died)
- Julián Cano y Tevar, O. Carm. (17 Jan 1714 – 20 Apr 1719 Died)
- José del Yermo Santibáñez (20 Mar 1720 – 8 Mar 1728 Appointed, Archbishop of Santiago de Compostela)
- Pedro Ayala, O.P. (8 Mar 1728 – 22 Jun 1738 Resigned)
- Narciso Queralt (23 Jun 1738 – 12 Jan 1743 Died)
- Pedro González García (20 May 1743 – 7 Apr 1758 Died)
- Romualdo Velarde y Cienfuegos (2 Oct 1758 – 11 May 1766 Died)
- Miguel Fernando Merino (1 Dec 1766 – 10 Jul 1781 Died)
- Antonio Sentmenat y Castellá (17 Feb 1783 – 22 Jun 1784 Resigned)
- Julián Gascueña Herráiz, O.F.M. Disc. (20 Sep 1784 – 23 Nov 1796 Died)
- Francisco Javier Cabrera Velasco (24 Jul 1797 – 22 Jan 1799 Died)
- Rafael de Múzquiz y Aldunate (15 Apr 1799 – 20 Jul 1801 Appointed, Archbishop of Santiago de Compostela)
- Manuel Gómez de Salazar (29 Mar 1802 – 3 Nov 1815 Died)
- Rodrigo Antonio de Orellana, O. Praem. (21 Dec 1818 – 29 Jul 1822 Died)
- Ramón María Adurriaga Uribe (24 May 1824 – 2 Feb 1841 Died)
- Manuel López Santisteban (17 Dec 1847 – 30 Apr 1852 Resigned)
- Gregorio Sánchez y Jiménez (Rubio), O.S.H. (27 Sep 1852 – 17 Feb 1854 Died)
- Juan Alfonso Albuquerque Berión (23 Jun 1854 – 25 Sep 1857 Confirmed, Bishop of Córdoba)
- Fernando Blanco y Lorenzo, O.P. (21 Dec 1857 – 17 Sep 1875 Confirmed, Archbishop of Valladolid)
- Pedro José Sánchez Carrascosa y Carrión, C.O. (23 Sep 1875 – Jan 1882 Resigned)
- Bl. Ciriaco María Sancha y Hervás (27 Mar 1882 – 10 Jun 1886 Appointed, Bishop of Madrid)
- Ramón Fernández Piérola y Lopez de Luzuriaca (17 Mar 1887 – 30 Dec 1889 Appointed, Bishop of Vitoria)
- Juan Muñoz y Herrera (26 Jun 1890 – 2 Dec 1895 Appointed, Bishop of Málaga)
- José María Blanco Barón (2 Dec 1895 – 4 Apr 1897 Died)
- Joaquín Beltrán y Asensio (24 Mar 1898 – 3 Nov 1917 Died)
- Enrique Pla y Deniel (4 Dec 1918 – 28 Jan 1935 Appointed, Bishop of Salamanca)
- Santos Moro Briz (21 Jun 1935 – 19 Oct 1968 Retired)
- Maximino Romero de Lema (19 Oct 1968 – 21 Mar 1973 Appointed, Secretary of the Congregation for the Clergy)
- Felipe Fernández García (22 Oct 1976 – 12 Jun 1991 Appointed, Bishop of San Cristóbal de La Laguna o Tenerife)
- Antonio Cañizares Llovera (6 Mar 1992 – 10 Dec 1996 Appointed, Archbishop of Granada)
- Adolfo González Montes (26 May 1997 – 15 Apr 2002 Appointed, Bishop of Almería)
- Jesús García Burillo (9 Jan 2003 – 6 Nov 2018 Retired)
- José María Gil Tamayo (6 Nov 2018 – 16 Jul 2022 Appointed, Coadjutor Archbishop of Granada)
- Jesús Rico García (15 July 2023 – present)

== See also ==
- Roman Catholicism in Spain
- Convento de San José (Ávila)
