= Diocese of Córdoba =

Roman Catholic diocese in Spain

Coordinates: 37.8789°N 4.7795°W

Diocese of Córdoba Dioecesis Cordubensis Diócesis de Córdoba

Catholic
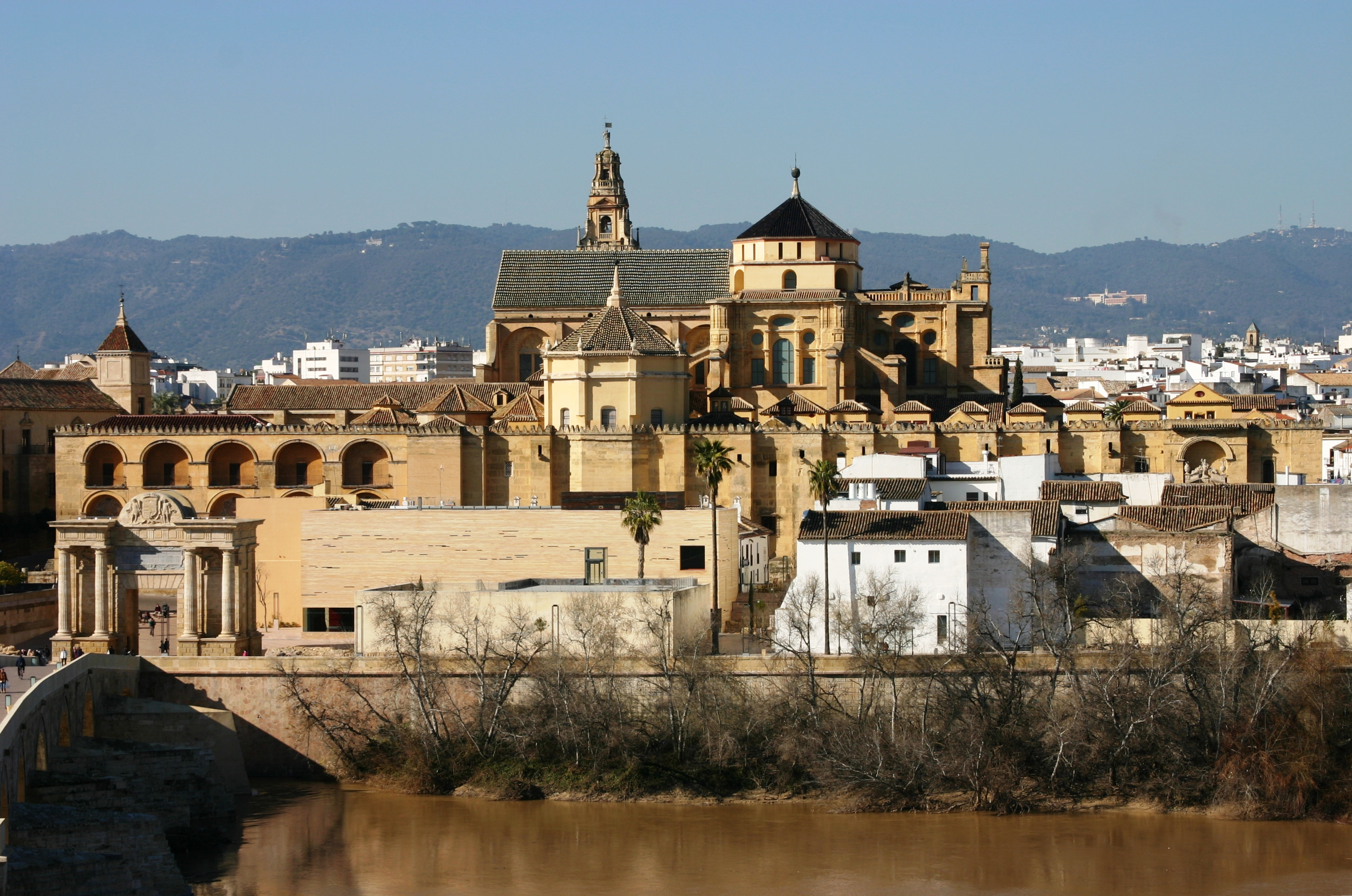
- Cathedral of Córdoba

Location
- Country: Spain
- Ecclesiastical province: Seville
- Metropolitan: Seville

Statistics
- Area: 13,717 km^{2} (5,296 sq mi)
- Population: Total; Catholics: (as of 2013); 805,857; 801,317 (99.4%)

Information
- Denomination: Roman Catholic
- Sui iuris church: Latin Church
- Rite: Roman Rite
- Established: 3rd Century
- Cathedral: Cathedral of the Assumption of Our Lady in Córdoba

Current leadership
- Pope: Leo XIV
- Bishop: Jesús Fernández González
- Metropolitan Archbishop: José Ángel Saiz Meneses
- Bishops emeritus: Demetrio Fernández González

Website
- Website of the Diocese

The Diocese of Córdoba (Latin: Dioecesis Cordubensis) is a Latin Church diocese of the Catholic Church located in the city of Córdoba in the ecclesiastical province of Sevilla in Spain. Demetrio Fernández González is the current bishop.

== List of bishops ==
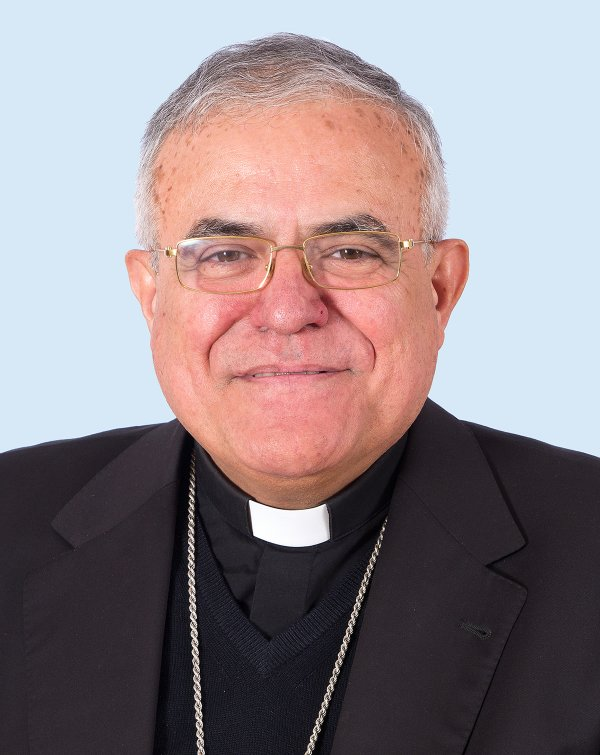
Bishop Demetrio Fernández González

- Severo (279)
- Grato
- Beroso
- Osio (295–357)
- Higinio (358–387)
- Gregorio (388)
- Esteban (finales del s. V)
- Agapio I (antes de 589 - c. 591)
- Eleuterio (c. 591 - después de 597)
- Agapio II (antes de 614 - c. 618)
- Honorio (c. 619- c. 633)
- Leudefredo (ca. 630–646)
- Fósforo (653)
- Mumulo (desde 683-hasta 688)
- Felix
- Leo (León, Leoncio, Leovigildo?)
- Recafredo

...

- Valens (862–875)

...

- Lope de Fitero (1237 – 10 June 1245)
- Gutierre Ruiz de Olea (23 Mar 1246 – 6 Feb 1249 Appointed, Archbishop of Toledo)
- Pedro Yáñez (1249–1251)
- Lope Pérez de Retes (1252–1257)
- Fernando de Mesa (1257–1274)
- Pascual (1274–1293)
- Gil Domínguez (1294–1299)
- Fernando Gutiérrez (13 Jun 1300 – 11 Apr 1326 Appointed, Bishop of Cuenca)
- Gutierre Ruiz (1326–1336)
- Juan Pérez de Saavedra (1336–1346)
- Fernando Núñez de Cabrera (1346–1350)
- Martín Jiménez de Argote (1350–1362)
- Andrés Pérez Navarro (22 Mar 1363 – 14 Sep 1372 Died)
- Andrés Pérez Navarro (1363–1372)
- Alfonso de Vargas (1373–1379)
- Juan Fernández Pantoja (1379–1397)
- Menendo, O.F.M. (1378 – 11 Feb 1393 Appointed, Bishop of Bayonne)
- Fernando González Deza (20 Sep 1398 – 1425 Died)
- Gonzalo Venegas (1426–1439)
- Sancho Sánchez de Rojas (1440–1454)
- Gonzalo de Illescas (1454–1464)
- Pedro de Córdoba y Solier (1464–1476)
- Alonso de Burgos (1477–1483, nombrado obispo de Cuenca)
- Tello de Buendía (1483–1484)
- Luis Velasco (1484–1485 Died)
- Iñigo Manrique de Lara (1485–1496 Died)
- Francisco Sánchez de la Fuente (1496 – Sep 1498 Died)
- Juan Rodríguez de Fonseca (1499–1504 Appointed, Bishop of Palencia)
- Juan Daza (4 Nov 1504 – 21 May 1510 Died)
- Martín Fernández de Angulo Saavedra y Luna (30 Sep 1510 – 21 Jun 1516 Died)
- Alfonso Manrique de Lara y Solís (18 Aug 1516 – 31 Aug 1523 Appointed, Archbishop of Sevilla)
- Juan Álvarez y Alva de Toledo, O.P. (31 Aug 1523 – 11 Apr 1537 Appointed, Bishop of Burgos)
- Pedro Fernández Manrique (11 Apr 1537 – 7 Oct 1540 Died)
- Leopoldo de Austria (29 Apr 1541 – 27 Sep 1557 Died)
- Diego Alava Esquivel (21 Oct 1558 – 24 Mar 1562 Died)
- Cristóbal Rojas Sandoval (27 May 1562 – 18 May 1571 Appointed, Archbishop of Sevilla)
- Bernardo de Fresneda, O.F.M. (16 Nov 1571 – 14 Oct 1577 Appointed, Archbishop of Zaragoza)
- Martín de Córdoba Mendoza, O.P. (13 Jun 1578 – 5 Jun 1581 Died)
- Antonio Rodríguez de Pazos y Figueroa (19 Mar 1582 – 28 Jun 1586 Died)
- Francisco Pacheco de Córdoba (14 Jan 1587 – 2 Oct 1590 Died)
- Fernando de la Vega Fonseca (20 Mar 1591 – 3 Sep 1591 Died)
- Pedro Portocarrero (bishop, died 1600) (12 Jan 1594 – 28 May 1597 Appointed, Bishop of Cuenca)
- Francisco Reinoso Baeza (11 Jun 1597 – 23 Aug 1601 Died)
- Pablo Laguna (30 Jul 1603 – 30 Jul 1606 Died)
- Diego Mardones, O.P. (7 Feb 1607 – Sep 1624 Died)
- Cristóbal de Lobera y Torres (19 Feb 1625 – 2 Dec 1630 Appointed, Bishop of Plasencia)
- Jerónimo Ruiz Camargo (16 Feb 1632 – 3 Jan 1633 Died)
- Domingo Pimentel Zúñiga, O.P. (18 Jul 1633 – 19 Jul 1649 Confirmed, Archbishop of Sevilla)
- Pedro Tapia, O.P. (23 Aug 1649 – 23 Sep 1652 Appointed, Archbishop of Sevilla)
- Juan Francisco Pacheco (14 Oct 1652 – 6 Oct 1653 Appointed, Bishop of Cuenca)
- Antonio Valdés Herrera (10 Nov 1653 – 13 Apr 1657 Died)
- Francisco Diego Alarcón y Covarrubias (24 Sep 1657 – 18 May 1675 Died)
- Alfonso de Salizanes y Medina, O.F.M. (18 Nov 1675 – 19 Nov 1685 Died)
- Pedro de Salazar Gutiérrez de Toledo, O. de M. (16 Sep 1686 – 15 Aug 1706 Died)
- Juan Bonilla Vargas, O.SS.T. (11 Apr 1707 – 1 Jan 1712 Died)
- Francisco Solís Hervás, O. de M. (17 Jan 1714 – 14 Oct 1716 Died)
- Marcelino Siuri Navarro (1 Oct 1717 – 28 Jan 1731 Died)
- Tomás Ratto Ottonelli (9 Nov 1731 – 17 Feb 1738 Died)
- Pedro Salazar Góngora (5 May 1738 – 21 Feb 1742 Died)
- Miguel Vicente Cebrián y Agustín (24 Sep 1742 – 30 May 1752 Died)
- Francisco de Solís Folch de Cardona (25 Sep 1752 – 17 Nov 1755 Appointed, Archbishop of Sevilla)
- Martín Barcia Carrascal (12 Jan 1756 – 22 Jun 1771 Died)
- Francisco Garrido de la Vega (30 Mar 1772 – 20 Jan 1776 Died)
- Baltasar Yusta y Navarro (17 Feb 1777 – Dec 1787 Died)
- Antonio Caballero y Góngora (15 Sep 1788 – 24 Mar 1796 Died)
- Agustín Ayestarán y Landa (27 Jun 1796 – 8 Apr 1804 Died)
- Pedro Antonio Trevilla (26 Jun 1805 – 15 Dec 1832 Died)
- Juan José Bonel y Orbe (29 Jul 1833 – 4 Oct 1847 Confirmed, Archbishop of Toledo)
- Manuel Joaquín Tarancón y Morón (4 Oct 1847 – 3 Aug 1857 Confirmed, Archbishop of Sevilla)
- Juan Alfonso Albuquerque Berión (25 Sep 1857 – 13 Mar 1874 Died)
- Zeferino González y Díaz Tuñón, O.P. (5 Jul 1875 – 15 Mar 1883 Appointed, Archbishop of Sevilla)
- Sebastián Herrero y Espinosa de los Monteros, C.O. (15 Mar 1883 – 24 Mar 1898 Appointed, Archbishop of Valencia)
- José Proceso Pozuelo y Herrero (24 Mar 1898 – 23 Mar 1913 Died)
- Ramón Guillamet y Coma (18 Jul 1913 – 22 Apr 1920 Appointed, Bishop of Barcelona)
- Adolfo Pérez y Muñoz (11 Jul 1920 – 21 Dec 1945 Died)
- Albino González y Menéndez Reigada, O.P. (18 Feb 1946 – 13 Aug 1958 Died)
- Manuel Fernández-Conde y García del Rebollar (2 Feb 1959 – 1 Jan 1970 Died)
- José María Cirarda Lachiondo (3 Dec 1971 – 31 Jan 1978 Appointed, Archbishop of Pamplona y Tudela)
- José Antonio Infantes Florido (25 May 1978 – 15 Mar 1996 Retired)
- Francisco Javier Martínez Fernández (15 Mar 1996 – 15 Mar 2003 Appointed, Archbishop of Granada)
- Juan José Asenjo Pelegrina (28 Jul 2003 – 13 Nov 2008 Appointed, Coadjutor Archbishop of Sevilla)
- Demetrio Fernández González (18 Feb 2010 – 27 Mar 2025 Retired)
- Jesús Fernández González (27 Mar 2025 – Present)

== See also ==
- Roman Catholicism in Spain
