= Bermudez (surname) =

Bermudez or the accented Bermúdez is a Spanish patronymic surname of Germanic origin, meaning "son of Bermudo". The surname itself is ancient Germanic ber- 'bear' + mōd- 'courage'. Some people that have the surname include:

- A. J. Bermudez, American author and screenwriter
- Adolfo Bermudez, American professional wrestler
- Aira Bermudez (born 1983), Filipina dancer and actress
- Alejandro Bermúdez (born 1975), Colombian swimmer
- Andrés Bermúdez Viramontes (1950–2009), Mexican businessman and politician
- Angel Bermudez (born 1950/1951), Aruban politician
- Antonio J. Bermúdez (1892–1977), Mexican businessman and politician
- Beatriz Bermúdez de Velasco, Spanish soldier during the Spanish Conquest of Mexico
- Carlos Alberto Arroyo Bermúdez (born 1979), Puerto Rican basketball player
- Carolina Bermudez (born 1978), Nicaraguan-American radio personality
- Christian Bermúdez (born 1987), known as "El Hobbit", Mexican football (soccer) player
- Chuny Bermúdez (born 1970), Spanish sports sailor
- Claudio Bermúdez (born 1971), Mexican singer and composer
- Cristian Bermúdez (born 1973), Guatemalan sports shooter
- Cristina Bermúdez (c. 982–1051/1067), daughter of King Bermudo II of León
- Cundo Bermúdez (1914–2008), Cuban painter
- Daniel Bermúdez (born 1950), Colombian architect and professor
- Daniela Romina Bermúdez (born 1989), Argentine boxer
- Dennis Bermudez (born 1986), American mixed martial artist
- Diego Bermúdez (footballer) (born 1982), Spanish football (soccer) player
- Diego Bermúdez (singer) (1850–1923), known as "el Tenazas", Spanish flamenco singer
- Edouard Bermudez (1832–1892), Chief Justice of the Louisiana Supreme Court
- Eduard Bermúdez (born 1984), Venezuelan boxer
- Enrique Bermúdez (1932–1991), commander of the Nicaraguan Contras
- Erandi Bermúdez (born 1977), Mexican politician
- Evelyn Nazarena Bermúdez (born 1996), Argentine boxer
- Fernando Antonio Bermúdez Arias (1933– 2007), Venezuelan medical doctor and writer
- Fernando Bermudez (born 1969), wrongfully convicted man and motivational speaker
- Fernando Bermúdez de Cea (died c. 978), 2nd Count of Cea, nobleman of the Kingdom of León
- Francisco Bermúdez de Pedraza (1585–1655), Spanish writer, jurist and historian
- Francisco Cea Bermúdez (1779–1850), Spanish diplomat and politician
- Francisco Morales-Bermúdez (1921–2022), Peruvian Army general
- Guillermo Bermúdez (1924–1995), Colombian architect and university professor
- Gustavo Bermúdez (born 1964), Argentine actor
- Jaime Bermúdez (born c. 1966), Colombian politician and diplomat
- Jerónimo Bermúdez (1530–1599), Spanish poet and playwright
- Jesús Bermúdez (1902–1945), Bolivian football (soccer) player
- Jimmy Bermúdez (born 1987), Colombian football (soccer) player
- Jorge Bermúdez (born 1971), Colombian football (soccer) player
- José Armando Bermúdez (1871–1941), Dominican Republic businessman
- José Francisco Bermúdez (1782–1831), Venezuelan military officer, leader in the Venezuelan War of Independence
- José Manuel Bermúdez (born 1958), Spanish rower
- José María Bermúdez (born 1975), Nicaraguan football (soccer) player
- José María Bermúdez de Castro (born 1952), Spanish paleoanthropologist
- José Miguel Bermúdez (born 1979), known as "José", Spanish football (soccer) player
- Juan de Bermúdez (died 1570), Spanish explorer, after whom Bermuda is named
- Juan Agustín Ceán Bermúdez (1749–1829), Spanish writer on art
- Julissa Bermúdez (born 1983), Dominican-American television host, actress, dancer, model and singer
- Karol Bermúdez (born 2001), Uruguayan football (soccer) player
- Lía Bermúdez (1930–2021), Venezuelan sculptor
- Lucho Bermúdez (1912–1994), Colombian musician and composer
- Manny Bermudez (born 1994), American mixed martial artist
- Manuel Bermúdez de Castro y Díez (1811–1870), Spanish economist and politician
- Manuel Octavio Bermúdez (1961–2024), Colombian serial killer
- Mariluz Bermúdez, Costa Rican television actress and model
- Martín Bermúdez (born 1958), Mexican race walker
- Miguel Mario Díaz-Canel Bermúdez (born 1960), President of Cuba
- Noelia Bermúdez (born 1994), Costa Rican football (soccer) player
- Nuria Bermúdez (born 1980), Spanish football (soccer) agent and actress
- Obie Bermúdez (born 1981), a Puerto Rican salsa singer and composer
- Ordoño Bermúdez (fl. 1001–1042), illegitimate son of King Bermudo II of León
- Patricia Bermúdez (born 1987), Argentine freestyle wrestler
- Pedro Pablo Bermúdez (1793–1852), Peruvian military man and politician
- Poppy Bermúdez (1928–2014), Dominican Republic businessman, grandson of José Armando Barmúdez
- Rafael Bermúdez (born 1978), Uruguayan football (soccer) player
- Sonia Bermúdez (born 1984), Spanish football (soccer) player
- Sonia Bermúdez Robles (born c. 1955), Colombian thanatologist
- Vicente Bermúdez Zacarías (c.1978–2016), Mexican federal judge, victim of murder
- Violeta Bermúdez (born 1961), Peruvian lawyer, diplomat and politician
- Yeniel Bermúdez (born 1985), Cuban football (soccer) player
