= Hermenegild II =

Hermenegild II (floruit 899–922) was an auxiliary bishop or coadjutor of the Diocese of Oviedo during the episcopates of Gomelo II, Flacinus, and Oveco. He was long mistaken for a senior bishop, as by Carlos González de Posada, who interposed his episcopate in that of Oveco for the years 915–22, and Manuel Risco, who placed it in 921–26.

The earliest reference to Hermenegild as a bishop of Oviedo probably dates to 899. In that year, Alfonso III of Asturias, who kept his capital at Oviedo, founded the temple of Santiago in a church council held at Oviedo. The acts of the council are preserved in the Tumbo Nuevo of Lugo Cathedral, and Hermenegild's name is attached to them. Their date, however, is controversial. A date of 14 June 927 that comes down to us in one copy of the acta is certainly false, as Alfonso III was long dead at the time, but the alternative date of 7 May 899 provided by another copy is consistent with the names of all signatories of the acta.

Hermenegild's name appears on a document dated 27 May 912 in the Libro de los testamentos, but it is probably a falsification of Bishop Pelagius. The next reliable document mentioning Hermenegild dates from 8 August 921, also preserved in the Libro. He next signs a document of Ordoño II, whereby the king confirmed that certain belongings of a monk named Fousos that had been promised to the monastery of Lourenzá but had not been given over because of Fousos' sudden death should be handed over promptly.
