= Bermudez =

Bermudez or Bermúdez may refer to:

== Places ==
- Bermúdez Municipality, in the eastern Venezuelan state of Sucre
- Capitán Bermúdez, a city in the province of Santa Fe, Argentina
- Estadio Jesús Bermúdez, a multi-purpose stadium in Oruro, Bolivia

== Other uses ==
- Bermudez (surname)
  - Juan de Bermúdez, namesake of Bermuda islands
- Bermúdez (TV series), a 2009 Colombian telenovela broadcast on Caracol TV
- Bermúdez (rum), a brand of a variety of rums from the Dominican Republic
- Bermudez Biscuit Company, a Trinidadian biscuit fabric
