= Oveco (bishop of Oviedo) =

Oveco (died 957x62) was the Bishop of Oviedo from 913/4, whose episcopate lasted almost half a century. Despite his longevity he is a relatively obscure figure. His origins lie in the same landed and wealthy aristocratic family as those of the Count Piniolo (Piñolo) who founded the monastery of San Juan Bautista de Corias. While the city of Oviedo and its diocese were overshadowed at the time of Oveco's election, at the height of his career, during the turbulent reign of Ramiro II, he was the senior bishop of the realm and his city was labelled the sedem regum ("seat of kings").

== Early episcopate ("Oveco I") ==
According to a theory advanced by Carlos González de Posada (1745–1831) and Manuel Risco there were two Ovecos who were bishops of Oviedo between 913 and 961. These years in the history of the diocese of Oviedo are extremely obscure and must be reconstructed primarily from documentary evidence extracted with care from amongst the forgeries of Bishop Pelagius. Posada partitioned the documentary references to Oveco into an Oveco I (until 920, when he died according to Risco) and an Oveco II (926–61). Part of the confusion is due to the probable presence in Oviedo since at the latest 899 of an auxiliary bishop named Hermenegild and counted by Posada as Bishop Hermenegild II (915–22) based on a document of 921. Posada also placed a certain Flacinus II in 923–25.

Though Oveco signed a document of 27 June 912 as Oveco Ovetensis sedis episcopus ("Oveco, bishop of the see of Oviedo"), his predecessor, Flacinus, was still bishop in October that year and it is probable that the copyist of the document dated it early by a year. Oveco appears in several charters of Ordoño II that are clearly dated incorrectly, but the authenticity of these (in spite of their dating clauses) is not established. A charter of 1 December 914 conserved in the Cathedral of Mondoñedo is the earliest attestation of Oveco as bishop with a certain date. On 29 January 915 Oveco attended a council of bishops held in Zamora. The council discussed the refoundation of the dioceses of Tuy and Lamego and the return of certain properties which had been held by the other bishops for sustenance during the period when their cities were under the control of the Emirate of Córdoba but which in fact pertained to the Diocese of Iria Flavia.

== Senior bishop of the realm (922–951) ==
Oveco witnessed several charters of Ordoño II during the years 916 and 917, some of them of dubious authenticity. One such, a charter relating to the dedication of a church in León and Ordoño's coronation there (9 January 916), has raised questions because of the lapse in time between Ordoño's succession (914) and his supposed coronation. While Oveco does not appear in any royal charters of 918 or 919, his importance is illustrated by his place among the signatories of Ordoño's concessions to Santos Cosme y Damián dated 12 April 920. He signs immediately after Ordoño, his brother Fruela II, and their brother, the infante Gonzalo, a younger son of Alfonso III who had entered the church and was an archdeacon under Oveco at Oviedo. In a royal charter of 1 August 922 Oveco is listed first among the bishops, probably by then the senior member of the Asturian episcopate. When Ordoño was succeeded by his brother Fruela, who had already been ruling Asturias, in 924 the royal court was moved from León back to Oviedo. In a royal charter of 17 September 924 Oveco calls himself sedis Regis Ovetensis ("of the royal see of Oviedo"). In a later diploma of that same year Oveco goes further and calls himself Obecco Dei gratia eps ("Oveco, by the grace of God bishop") for the first time.

Towards the end of 927 a church council was held under the joint presidency of Alfonso IV, son of Ordoño II and successor of Fruela II, and his elder brother Sancho, then ruling Galicia, to address the disorganisation of the monastery of Santa María de Loyo. Oveco is listed second among the assembled at the end of the minutes (dated 23 December). He is recorded as Sancti Saluatoris ouetensis eps (bishop of San Salvador de Oviedo). The record of Oveco in subsequent years is complicated by the fact that León also had at that time a bishop named Oveco (928–50). In many cases it is impossible to determine to which "Bishop Oveco" a given charter refers. In 933 both Ovecos, of Oviedo and León, signed documents of Ramiro II and his queen, Urraca Sánchez. During Ramiro's reign Oveco of Oviedo usually signed first among bishops.

On 13 September 936, Froila Gutiérrez and his wife donated a parcel of land to his brother Rudesind for the construction of a monastery, later known as Celanova. A bishop Oveco witnessed the donation, but whether the bishop of Oviedo or León is unknown. The bishop of Oviedo later witnessed a donation of Ilduara, Rudesind's mother, to Celanova on 27 February 938. Oveco's star continued to rise under Ramiro II. On 26 September 942 Rudesind named a certain Frankila abbot of Celanova and donated numerous goods to the monastery. This donation was undersigned by the king first, Rudesind second, and Oveco third, who is qualified as gerens pastorali cura Ouetencis ecclesia et regia sedem ("bearing pastoral care of the royal see and church of Oviedo"). The dating clause refers to the year as anno feliciter decimo in sedem regum Ouetho ("happily the tenth year [of Ramiro's reign] in the royal seat of Oviedo"), indicating the high place of Oviedo in the kingdom under Ramiro II. Despite this, the capital was still León, where Oveco confirmed a charter of Ramiro's on 25 May 948, the last date he appears in a document of this king.

== Declining health and death ==
In 951 Oveco appears in two charters of Ordoño III, Ramiro's successor. After that he only appears twice in the documents (in 953 and 957), perhaps due to advanced age, though he may have ruled his see for a decade more. The Spanish historian Manuel Risco places his death in 962, though Antonio Palomeque Torres believes that 957 or 958 was more likely.

== Notes ==
| Preceded by Flacinus | Bishop of Oviedo; 913/4 – 957/62 | Succeeded by Diego |
