= Bermudo =

Bermudo or Vermudo, from Latin Veremundus, is a given name of Germanic origin. It may refer to:

- Veremund (fl. c. 500), Suevic king of Galicia
- Bermudo I of Asturias (r. 788–91), king, called "the Deacon" (el Diácono)
- Bermudo II of León (r. 984–99), king, called "the Gouty" (el Gotoso)
- Bermudo III of León (r. 1029–37), king
- Bermudo Núñez (d. c. 955), first count of Cea
- Bermudo (bishop of Oviedo) (d. 992/3)
- Bermudo Ovéquiz (fl. 1044–92), Asturian magnate
- Bermudo Pérez de Traba (d. 1168), Galician magnate
