= Bermudo (bishop of Oviedo) =

Bermudo or Vermudo (probably died 992/3) was the ninth Bishop of Oviedo. Historians and clerics Manuel Risco and Carlos González de Posada both date his episcopate to 976–92. Since his predecessor, Diego, is not mentioned in any document after May 971 and no bishop of Oviedo signed the act of the synod that suppressed the Diocese of Simancas in 974, it is presumed that the diocese of Oviedo lay vacant in the early 970s. Bermudo first appears as bishop in a document of 15 March 975 confirming the donation by Cromacio Melliniz and his family of the monastery of San Jorge to the Cathedral of San Salvador and its bishop. Bermudo signs immediately after Ramiro III of León and his regent, Elvira Ramírez.

On 14 March 976 Bermudo confirmed a donation by the count Froila Velaz. On 23 September 978 he received a gift of the monastery of Cartavio from king Ramiro. A document of 14 January 979 is the last certain confirmation of Bermudo of Oviedo for several years. Bermudo may have confirmed a charter of 14 January 981 (it is signed by bishop named Beremundus, see unstated) and perhaps also a donation of Sevariego, Bishop of León, and a certain Gómez Didaz in the presence of the royal court on 16 November 985 (again Beremundus without a specified diocese). On 1 July 986 a royal donation was confirmed by a bishop Bermudo and a donation by a certain count Almundo on 29 May 987 by a Ueremundus episcopus (bishop Bermudo). On 24 December 988 Bermudo, identified as of Oviedo, confirmed a royal donation to Celanova. On 2 May 989 the bishop made an exchange of villages with count Gundemaro Pinioliz and his wife. In 990 and 991 a bishop Bermudo is again in the documents without reference to a diocese.

From 978 on, a certain Gudesteus periodically signs as bishop of Oviedo. The likely explanation is that Bermudo, being perhaps old and physically weak, retired formally to a monastery and entrusted daily episcopal duties to an auxiliary bishop, Gudesteus, who would succeed him in full later. This practice was not uncommon at the time and Oviedo had known an auxiliary bishop earlier in the tenth century (Hermenegild II, fl. 899–921). A document of 29 July 991, signed only by Gudesteus, may indicate that by then Bermudo had retired completely, only coming out of retirement for a special purpose.

On 2 September 992 both Bermudo and Gudesteus signed the same document as bishops of Oviedo. This may be related to the enmity which Bishop Pelagius reported over a century later between Gudesteus and King Bermudo II, who was opposed more generally by the Asturians and Leonese and was consequently forced to seek his coronation in Galicia. This last act recorded of Bermudo (2 September 992) was the witnessing of the royal will and testament in León. In it Bermudo II confirmed all Oviedo's possessions and privileges and all the gifts and concessions which he had made to it. Specific mention is made of property formerly possessed by the bishop Bermudo but which had been despoiled by the petty nobleman Ecta Sarraciniz, who fought against Bermudo II while he was still reigning only in Galicia.

== Notes ==
Preceded by Diego	Bishop of Oviedo; 974/5 – 992/3	Succeeded by Gudesteus
