= Sonia Bermúdez =

Sonia Bermúdez may refer to:

- Sonia Bermúdez (thanatologist) (born c. 1955), Colombian forensic thanatologist
- Sonia Bermúdez (footballer) (born 1984), Spanish footballer
