= Viramontes =

Viramontes is a surname. Notable people with the surname include:

- Andrés Bermúdez Viramontes (1950–2009), Mexican businessman and politician
- Brenda Viramontes (born 1995), Mexican footballer
- Helena Maria Viramontes (born 1954), American fiction writer and university professor
- Tony Viramontes (1956–1988), American artist
