= Gudesteus (bishop of Oviedo) =

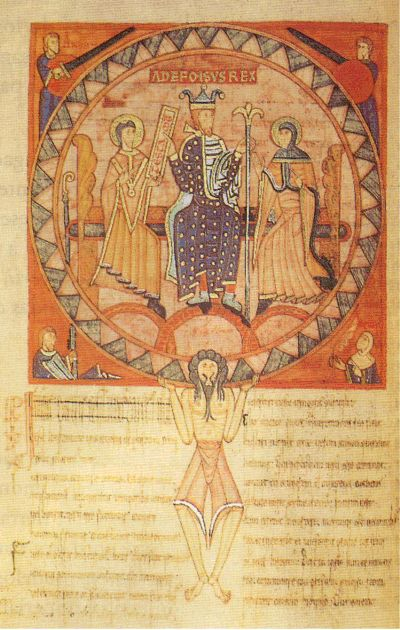
Alfonso V flanked by Gudesteus (left) and his queen, Elvira (right), from folio 53v of the Libro gótico de los testamentos.

Gudesteus or Gudesteo (died 1008x12) was the tenth bishop of Oviedo. He served as an auxiliary bishop to Bishop Bermudo, perhaps by then old and physically weak, from at least 978 and succeeded him as sole bishop on his death, probably in 992. On folio 49 of the Libro gótico de los testamentos of Oviedo, Bermudo and Gudesteus appear beside each in a miniature illustration.

== Auxiliary bishop ==
Gudesteus was an Asturian by birth and his parents had left him properties in Lena. Gudesteus's first recorded action as auxiliary bishop was to witness a charter on 10 July 978, with Bermudo not present. On 24 April 984 he calls himself Ouetensis sedis episcopo ("bishop of the see of Oviedo"), again with no reference to Bermudo, though the senior bishop confirmed many other documents in the 980s. A document of 29 July 991 by which King Bermudo II donated a village in Asturias to Bishop Savaric of León, signed only by Gudesteus and not Bermudo, may indicate that by then the latter had retired fully. He would have to have come out of retirement on 2 September 992, when both he and Gudesteus signed the same document as bishops of Oviedo. This may be related to the enmity which Bishop Pelagius reported in his Chronicon regum Legionensium over a century later between Gudesteus and Bermudo II, who was opposed more generally by the Asturians and Leonese and was consequently forced to seek his coronation in Galicia. The act of 2 September 992, Bermudo's last recorded, was the confirmation of the royal will in León. In it Bermudo II confirmed all Oviedo's possessions and privileges and all the gifts and concessions which he had made to it.

== Bishop ==
There survives from February 993 the foundation stone for a church consecrated by Gudesteus. Gudesteus appears regularly in documents of Bermudo II's reign between 993 and October 996, but after that and until October 999 he does not appear at all. This too may be related to the reported enmity between the "indiscrete and tyrannical" Bermudo II and Gudesteus. According to Pelagius, Bermudo incarcerated Gudesteus in the Galician castle at Prima de Reyna (or Peña de la Reina) for three years. This injustice was followed by severe drought and famine. This, and a vision received by certain godly men, convinced Bermudo to send envoys to Bishop Jimeno of Astorga, who had been administering Oviedo in the meanwhile, asking him to restore Gudesteus. If this account is accurate (Pelagius has been called the "prince of falsifiers", not for his chronicle but for his forgeries), then Gudesteus's restoration must have occurred shortly before Bermudo's death in 999, probably in early September. Gudesteus took part in the coronation of Alfonso V and Elvira in September, where he spoke the words Sub Imperio opificis rerum Gudesteo universalis Oveto episcopus, confirming the accession. Gudesteus appears in a charter of 13 October, his first in three years.

On 10 March 1000 Gudesteus again employed the unusual formula universalis Ecclesiae Oveto episcopus ("universal bishop of the church of Oviedo") in confirming the concession by Salvato of the village of Morella to the Church of San Cipriano (Pillarno). His importance in the realm under Alfonso V is also evident in his position in witness lists. On 18 May 1000 he signed immediately after the king and queen and on 18 December the church Oviedo received a royal donation. This last act is preserved in the Libro gótico de los testamentos, where only Gudesteus confirms it, but in a later copy it is confirmed by Gudesteus and his successor, Adegani, both as bishops of Oviedo immediately after the king and queen. The properties which Alfonso donated were originally confiscated from a certain Analso Garvixo, who had tried to assassinate Alfonso when he was a child. In the donation Alfonso refers to vobis patri nostro Gudesteo episcopo ("you, our father, bishop Gudesteus"). Probably Adegani was an auxiliary bishop appointed due to Gudesteus's advanced age.

The final years of Gudesteus's episcopate are illuminated by the copies of archival documents made by Vigil for his Asturias monumental y epigráfica. He finds documents confirmed by Gudesteus for 11 March and 29 August 1006 and for others of 1008 and 1011. By the 29 August charter, Velasquita, widow of Bermudo II, made a large donation which was witnessed first by a certain Ponce, who signs as archiepiscopo (archbishop). Gudesteus, Dei gratia episcopus (bishop by the grace of god), signs later in the list. Historian Manuel Risco believed Ponce to be another auxiliary bishop and coadjutor of Gudesteus. Risco also found Gudesteus's confirming a document of 1 February 1007 in which Alfonso V and his uncle, Menendo González, Count of Portugal, gave a sentence in favour of the monastery of Celanova. On 10 July 1008 Gudesteus made his testament, whereby he gave to the church of Oviedo the property he owned in Lena. Antonio Palomeque Torres reckoned 1008 to be his last year, and Carlos González de Posada believed his successor, Adegani, commenced his episcopate in 1009, but places Gudesteus's death in 1012.

== Notes ==
| Preceded by Bermudo | Bishop of Oviedo; 978 – 992/3 (auxiliary); 992/3 – 1008/12 (in full) | Succeeded by Adegani |
