= Poppy Bermúdez =

Argentine-born Dominican businessman

José Armando Bermúdez Pippa (12 November 1928 – 3 December 2014), known as Poppy Bermúdez, was an Argentine-born Dominican businessman and the third CEO of J. Armando Bermúdez & Co., C. por A. after José Armando and Domingo Octavio Bermúdez.

== Early life ==
Born in Buenos Aires in 1928, he was the son of the Dominican businessman Aquiles Bermúdez Ramos (1901–1970) – the son of José Armando Bermúdez Rochet and Ana Luisa Ramos de Peña – and Pastora Luisa Pippa, an Italian Argentine woman. A few months after he was born, his family moved to Santiago de los Caballeros, Dominican Republic, where he lived the rest of his life.

== Career ==
In 1968, Bermúdez founded Color Visión the first color television channel in the Dominican Republic and the third in Latin America.

== Death ==
Poppy Bermúdez died on 3 December 2014 in Santiago de los Caballeros.
