= Diego (bishop of Oviedo) =

Diego (died between 971 and 975) was the eighth Bishop of Oviedo. The chief source for his life is his will and testament, which survives in the archives of the Cathedral of San Salvador in Oviedo. His episcopate began after the death of his predecessor, Oveco, sometime between 957 and 962.

Diego was a native of the village of Hevía, a third part of which he was lord by inheritance. He consecrated the church of San Félix there, which, with another church on his property, was later given to the church of Oviedo, along with all his familial possessions in and around Hevía (30 March 967).

The early years of Diego's episcopate are made murky by the presence of bishops named Diego in Ourense and Valpuesta at the same time. The identification of a given "Bishop Diego" in the contemporary documentation is therefore difficult and often uncertain. This is only compounded by the numerous errors of dating and outright falsifications (especially by Bishop Pelagius in the twelfth century) of charters. Several document from between 948 and 954 are signed by a bishop named Diego without reference to his diocese. None of these, probably, belong to Diego of Oviedo. The earliest sure reference to Diego of Oviedo is from an eighteenth-century copy of a document dated, incorrectly, to 934. That Diego's episcopate began in 958 receives some support from the fact that four charters of that year bear the confirmation of a Diego and one—a donation of Ordoño IV to the monastery of Sobrado on 13 November—specifies him as ouetense sedis ("of the see of Oviedo").

There is no reference to Diego between 958 and his donation of his patrimony in 967 save for a single charter confirmation from February 961. After 967 there is one confirmation from 968, one from 969, three from 971, all royal charters of Ramiro III and Elvira Ramírez of León. After that there is no record of Diego and in March 975 his see was occupied by his successor, Bermudo. No bishop of Oviedo attended the council which suppressed the Diocese of Simancas in 974, or if one did he did not sign the acts. This possibly indicates a vacancy in the see of Oviedo at that time.

Preceded by Oveco	Bishop of Oviedo; 957/62 – 971/5	Succeeded by Bermudo
