= Hermeneric =

- King of the Suevi
- Reign: c. 485
- Predecessor: Remismund
- Successor: Veremund

Timeline of the Suebic Kings

Hermeneric was a Suevic King of Galicia according to a now lost document described by the priest Antonio de Yepes.

According to Yepes, the king reigned around 485, which falls within a century-long period (469–c.560) of obscurity during which the Sueves were predominantly Arian Christians.

Hermeneric was said to be a destroyer of churches and persecutor of Catholic Christians.

== Sources ==
- Arias, Jorge C. "Identity and Interactions: The Suevi and the Hispano-Romans." University of Virginia: Spring 2007.

Preceded by Remismund	King of Galicia fl. c. 485	Succeeded by Veremund
