= Flacinus =

Flacinus, Flacino, or Flagino was the Bishop of Oviedo between 909 and 912, possibly from as early as 907 until as late as 914. His predecessor was Gomelo II and he first appears in a document of the latter's episcopate, on 20 January 905, signing as both a presbyter and a primicerius ("Flacinus presbyter, Primicerius testis"). The earliest evidence of his episcopate is a pair of charters for Sahagún (dated 28 April and 28 May 909) in which he signs as Placinius without reference to his see. In 912 when García I made a donation to San Ciprián Flacinus signed as a witness, but again without reference to his see.

On 24 October 912 Flacinus—this time clearly identified by his diocese—received a generous gift from Alfonso IV: villages, estates, ornaments of gold, silver and marble, and books. This charter has been dated incorrectly to 914. A document of 27 May 912 in the Libro de los Testamentos that cites Flacinus is a twelfth-century forgery of the bishop Pelagius, not as it claims of a certain bishop Hermenegild. Flacinus's successor, Oveco, was in power by 914.

Preceded by Gomelo II	Bishop of Oviedo; 907/9 – 912/14	Succeeded by Oveco
