= Archdiocese of Oviedo =

Archdiocese of the Roman Catholic Church in Spain

Coordinates: 43°21′36″N 5°50′42″W

Archdiocese of Oviedo Archidioecesis Ovetensis Archidiócesis de Oviedo

Catholic
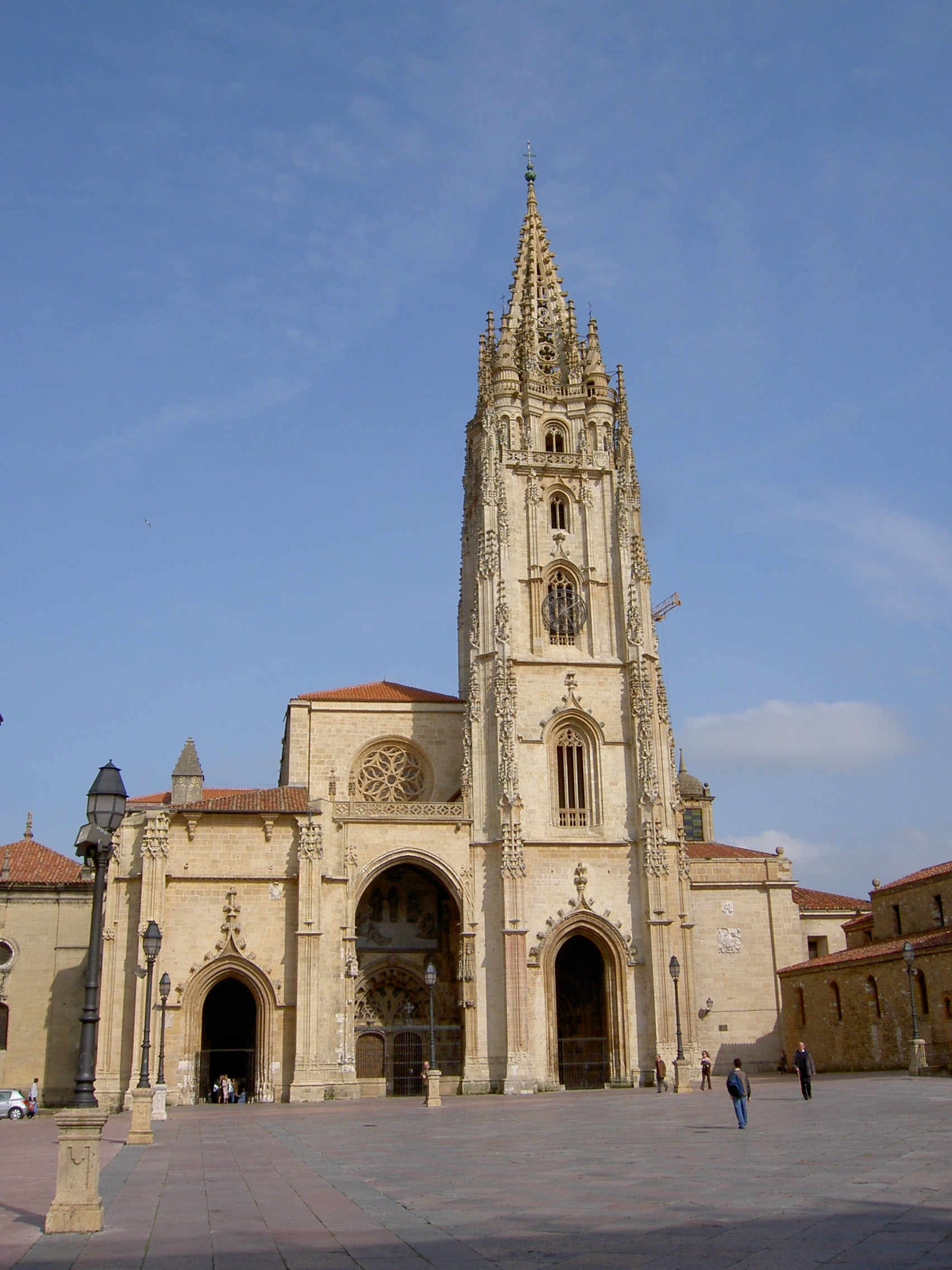
- Oviedo Cathedral

Location
- Country: Spain

Statistics
- Area: 10,565 km^{2} (4,079 sq mi)
- Population: Total; Catholics: (as of 2004); 1,075,381; 1,016,235 (94.5%)

Information
- Denomination: Roman Catholic
- Rite: Latin Rite
- Established: 811 (As Diocese of Oviedo); 27 October 1954 (As Archdiocese of Oviedo)
- Cathedral: Cathedral Basilica of the Holy Saviour in Oviedo

Current leadership
- Pope: Leo XIV
- Metropolitan Archbishop: Jesús Sanz Montes O.F.M.
- Suffragans: Diocese of Astorga; Diocese of León; Diocese of Santander

Map
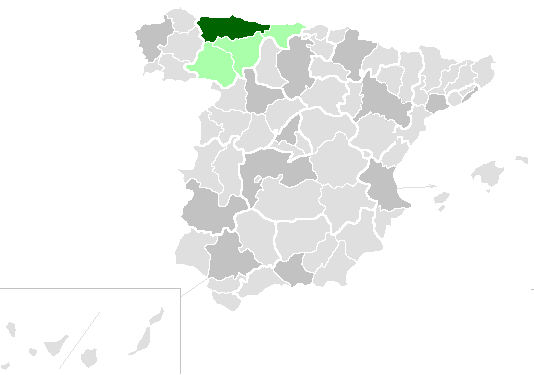

Website
- Website of the Archdiocese

The Archdiocese of Oviedo (Latin: Oveten(sis); Asturleonese: Archidiócesis d'Uviéu) is a Latin Church Archdiocese of the Catholic Church in Spain. The archdiocese encompasses roughly the current autonomous community of Asturias or Principality of Asturias. Erected in the 9th century, the diocese was elevated to an archdiocese in 1954. The diocesan see is in the city of Oviedo, where the Catedral de San Salvador is located.

As of 2023, the archdiocese has a total of 945,818 baptized Catholics, out of a total population of 1,006,193. The number of parishes in the same year was 932, with 337 priests (66 of them belonging to the regular clergy, and the remainder to the secular clergy). There were also 493 nuns and 110 monks.

== History ==
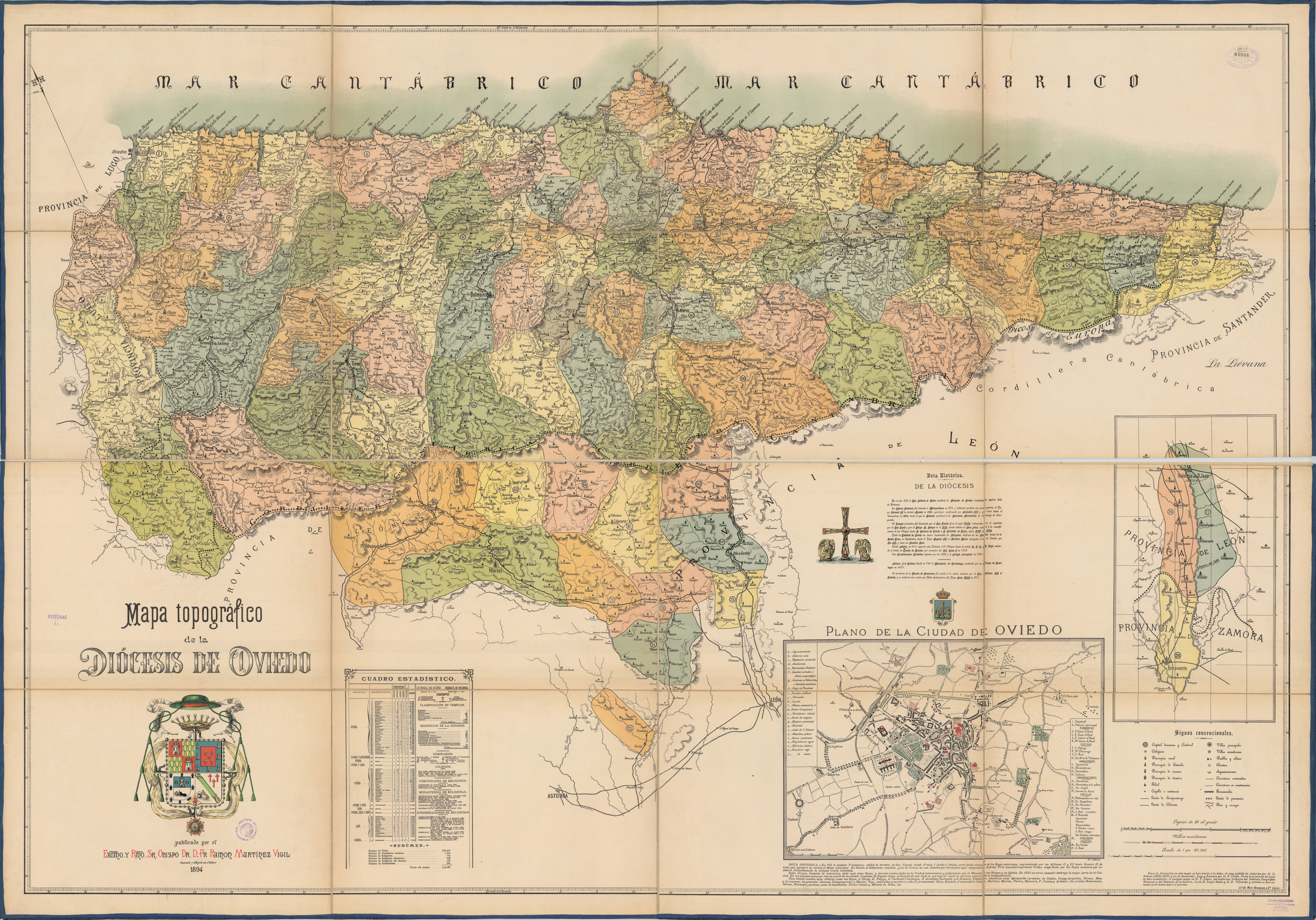
Map of the diocese of Oviedo in 1894

- 811: Established as Diocese of Oviedo
- 27 October 1954: Promoted as Metropolitan Archdiocese of Oviedo

== Suffragan dioceses ==
- Astorga
- León
- Santander

== Special churches ==
- Minor Basilicas:
  - Basilica of Santa María la Real, Covadonga
  - Basilica of Santa María Magdalena, Cangas del Narcea
  - Basilica-Sanctuary of Sagrado Corazón, Gijón
  - Basilica of Santa Maria de la Asunción de Llanes, Llanes
- World Heritage Churches
  - Basilica of San Julián de los Prados, Oviedo
  - Church of San Miguel de Lillo, Oviedo
  - Church of Santa Cristina de Lena, Lena
  - Church of Santa María del Naranco, Oviedo

== Leadership ==
=== Before 17th century ===
Name	Appointed/Confirmed by	Years in this role	Ref
Adulfo		802–812	
Gomelo I		852	
Serrano		853–858	
Hermenegild I		881	
Gomelo II		905–909	
Flacinus		909–912	
Oveco		913–962	
Hermenegild II (auxiliary bishop)			
Diego		962–968	
Bermudo		976–991	
Gudesteo		991–996	
Agda		–1024	
Ponce		1025–1028	
Froilán		1035–1073	
Arias Cromaz		1073–1094	
Martín I		1094–1101	
Pelagius		1098–1129	
Alfonso		1129–1142	
Martín II		1143–1156	
Pedro I		1156–1175	
Rodrigo		1175–1188	
Menendo		1188–1189	
Juan González		1189–1243	
Rodrigo Díaz		1243–1249	
Pedro II		1251–1269	
Fernando Martínez		1269–1275	
Alvero (Electo)		1275	
Fredolo		1275–1284	
Peregrino		1286–1289	
Miguel		1289–1292	
Fernando Álvarez		1293–1295	
Fernando Alfonso		1295–1301	
Fernando Álvarez		1302–1321	
Odón		1323–1328	
Juan del Campo	Bishop of León	1328–1332	
Juan Sancho		1332–1345	
Alfonso II		1345–1348	
Sancho		1348–1369	
Gutierre de Toledo		1377–1389	
Guillermo García Manrique		1389–1412	
Álvaro		1397–1412	
Diego Ramírez de Guzmán		1412–1441	
García Enríquez Osorio		1441–1442	
Diego Rapado		1442–1444	
Iñigo Manrique de Lara (archbishop)	Bishop of Coria	1444–1457	
Rodrigo Sánchez de Arévalo		1457–1467	
Juan Diaz de Coca	Bishop of Calahorra y La Calzada	20 Dec 1467 – 13 Feb 1470	
Alfonso de Palenzuela		1469–1475	
Gonzalo de Villadiego		1485–1487	
Juan Arias de Villar	Bishop of Segovia	1487–1498	
Juan Daza	Bishop of Cartagena	14 Feb 1498 – 16 Mar 1502	
García Ramírez Villaescusa, O.S.		16 Mar 1502 – 23 Apr 1508	
Valeriano Ordóñez Villaquirán		22 Dec 1508 – 12 Aug 1512	
Diego de Muros		1 Oct 1512 – 18 Aug 1525	
Francisco Mendoza	Bishop of Zamora)	6 Nov 1525 – 3 Apr 1527	
Diego Acuña		23 Apr 1527 – 1532	
Fernando de Valdés y Salas	Bishop of León	1 Jul 1532 – 30 May 1539	
Martín Tristán Calvete		30 May 1539 – 1546	
Cristóbal Rojas Sandoval	Bishop of Badajoz	8 Oct 1546 – 4 May 1556	
Jerónimo Velasco		4 May 1556 – 16 Aug 1566	
Juan Ayora		8 Jan 1567 – 24 May 1569	
Gonzalo de Solórzano		18 Feb 1570 – 26 Sep 1580	
Francisco Antonio Orantes Vélez, O.F.M.		6 Mar 1581 – 12 Oct 1584	
Diego Aponte Quiñones, O.S.	Bishop of Málaga	28 Jan 1585 – 31 Aug 1598	
Gonzalo Gutiérrez Montilla		18 Sep 1598 – 20 Jun 1602	

=== Since the 17th century ===
Name	Appointed/Confirmed by	Years in this role	Ref
Alonso Martínez de la Torre, O.S.		16 Apr 1603 – 11 Sep 1604	
Juan Alvarez de Caldas	Bishop of Ávila	12 Jan 1605 – 14 May 1612	
Francisco de la Cueva, O.S.A.		17 Sep 1612 – 30 Nov 1615	
Alsono Martín de Zuñiga (Manso)	Bishop of Osma	18 Jul 1616 – 20 Mar 1623	
Juan Torres de Osorio	Archbishop of Valladolid	29 May 1624 – 19 Jul 1627	
Juan Pereda Gudiel		9 Aug 1627 – 25 May 1632	
Martín Carrillo Alderete	Bishop of Osma	10 Jan 1633 – 9 Jun 1636	
Antonio Valdés Herrera	Bishop of Osma	23 Jun 1636 – 21 Oct 1641	
Bernardo Caballero Paredes		13 Jan 1642 – 13 Apr 1661	
Diego Riquelme y Quirós	Bishop of Plasencia	19 Dec 1661 – 23 Feb 1665	
Ambrosio Ignacio Spínola y Guzmán	Archbishop of Valencia	13 Apr 1665 – 7 Mar 1667	
Diego Sarmiento Valladares	Bishop of Plasencia	30 Jan 1668 – 17 Sep 1668	
Alfonso de Salizanes y Medina, O.F.M.	Bishop of Córdoba	4 Feb 1669 – 18 Nov 1675	
Alonso Antonio de San Martín	Bishop of Cuenca	16 Dec 1675 – 21 Oct 1681	
Simón García Pedrejón, O.F.M.		20 Apr 1682 – 27 Sep 1696	
Tomás Reluz, O.P.		27 Mar 1697 – 12 Jun 1706	
José Fernández del Toro		21 Mar 1707 – Jul 1719	
Antonio Maldonado y Minoja		3 Jul 1720 – 22 Jun 1722	
Tomás José Ruiz Montes	Archbishop (Personal Title) of Cartagena	15 Mar 1723 – 11 Sep 1724	
Manuel José de Hendaya y Haro		11 Sep 1724 – 5 Oct 1729	
Juan Garcia Avello y Castrillón		8 Feb 1730 – 30 Oct 1744	
Gaspar José Vázquez Tablada		19 Jul 1745 – 29 Dec 1745	
Felipe Martín Ovejero		22 Jul 1750 – 30 Oct 1753	
Juan Francisco Manrique Lara	Bishop of Plasencia	1 Apr 1754 – 21 Apr 1760	
Augstín González Pisador		21 Jul 1760 – 17 Mar 1791	
Juan Llano y Ponte		26 Sep 1791 – 29 Apr 1805	
Andreas de Torres y Gómez		23 Sep 1805 – 12 Feb 1806	
Gregorio Hermida y Gamba (Camba)		26 Aug 1806 – 10 Nov 1814	
Gregorio Ceruelo de la Fuente		10 Jul 1815 – 26 Mar 1836	
Ignacio Díaz de la Caneja y Sosa		17 Jan 1848 – 20 Nov 1856	
Juan Ignacio Moreno y Maisanove	Archbishop of Valladolid	25 Sep 1857 – 1 Oct 1863	
José Luis Montagut y Rubio	Bishop of Segorbe	21 Dec 1863 – 22 Jun 1868	
Benito Sanz y Forés	Archbishop of Valladolid)	22 Jun 1868 – 18 Nov 1881	
Sebastián Herrero y Espinosa de los Monteros, C.O.	Bishop of Córdoba	27 March 1882 – 15 March 1883	
Ramón Martínez y Vigil, O.P.		27 Mar 1884 – 16 Aug 1904	
Francisco Javier Baztán y Urniza		14 Nov 1904 – 18 Oct 1920	
Juan Bautista Luis y Pérez		30 Nov 1921 – 6 Nov 1934	
Justo Antonino de Echeguren y Aldama		28 Jan 1935 – 16 Aug 1937	
Manuel Arce y Ochotorena	Archbishop of Tarragona	22 Jan 1938 – 29 Mar 1944	
Benjamín de Arriba y Castro	Archbishop of Tarragona	8 Aug 1944 – 22 Jan 1949	
Francisco Javer Lauzurica y Torralba		8 Apr 1949 – 12 Apr 1964	
Vicente Enrique y Tarancón	Archbishop of Toledo	12 Apr 1964 – 30 Jan 1969	
Gabino Díaz Merchán		4 Aug 1969 – 7 Jan 2002	
Carlos Osoro Sierra	Archbishop of Valencia	7 Jan 2002 – 8 Jan 2009	
Jesús Sanz Montes, O.F.M.		21 Nov 2009 –	

== See also ==
- Roman Catholicism in Spain
