= Martin I (bishop of Oviedo) =

A tonsured Martin, holding his will, in a Romanesque miniature of the near-contemporary Liber testamentorum ("Book of testaments").

Martin I (died 1 March 1101) was the fifteenth Bishop of Oviedo from 1094.

On 23 March 1097 Alfonso VI, probably at Sahagún, where he had spent Christmas, made a large donation to Bishop Martin which was confirmed by most of the major court figures. Martin remained with the court through Easter (5 April) and was present in León on 14 April when Alfonso made a donation to the Cathedral of León. Martin confirmed a document of the council of Palencia on 5 December 1100, the last reference to him in the documents. He was succeeded by Pelagius sometime between then and 1102. This Pelagius is called "bishop" in documents from as early as 1098 and some historians have concluded that he was Martin's auxiliary or coadjutor.

== Notes ==
Catholic Church titles
Preceded by Arias Cromaz	Bishop of Oviedo; 1094–1100/2	Succeeded by Pelagius
