= List of municipal presidents of Jerez =

Following is a list of municipal presidents of Jerez, in the Mexican state of Zacatecas:

Term	Municipal president	Political party	Notes
1950–1953	Toribio Peralta Gómez	PRI	
1953–1956	Jesús Vela Ruiz	PRI	
1956–1959	Domingo Dorado	PRI	
1959–1962	Salvador Carlos González	PRI	
1962–1965	Anastasio Ávila Ávila	PRI	
1965–1968	Rafael Argüelles Robles	PRI	
1968–1971	Fernando Robles Cepeda	PRI	
1971–1973	Ignacio Herrera Mendoza	PRI	
1973–1974	Manuel Carrillo Martínez	PRI	
1974–1977	Joaquín Escobedo	PRI	
1977–1980	Benito Juárez García	PRI	
1980–1983	Jesús Sánchez García	PRI	
1983–1986	Gonzalo González del Río	PRI	
1986–1987	Juan de Santiago Silva	PRI	
1987–1989	José Manuel Escobedo del Real	PRI	
1989–1992	Bertha Torres Valdez	PRI	
1992–1995	Jesús Sánchez García	PRI	
1995–1995	María Esther de la Torre	PRI	
1995–1998	Arturo Villarreal Ávila	PRI	
1998–2001	Benito Juárez García	PRI	
2001–2004	Ismael Solís Mares	PRD	
2004–2007	Andrés Bermúdez Viramontes	PAN	
2007–2010	Alma Araceli Ávila Cortez	PRD	
2010–2013	Eduardo López Mireles	PRI; PVEM	
15/09/2013–14/09/2016	José Manuel de Jesús Viramontes Rodarte	PAN; PRD	
2016–2018	Fernando Enrique Uc Jacobo	PRI; PVEM; Panal	Coalition "Zacatecas First"
2018–2021	Antonio Aceves Sánchez	PAN; PRD; MC	
2021–2024	José Humberto Salazar Contreras	PT; PVEM; Morena; Panal	
2024–	Rodrigo Ureño Bañuelos	PRD	
