= Oveco Núñez =

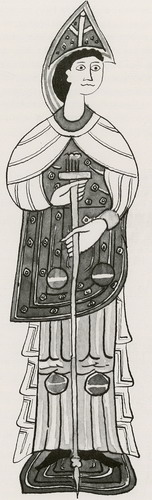
A late tenth- or early eleventh-century representation of a bishop, from the Codex Emilianensis

Oveco Núñez (died 951) was the Bishop of León from 927 until his death. His episcopate coincides with the reign of King Ramiro II (931–51), whose faithful supporter he was.

Oveco is sometimes confused with his contemporary bishop of the same first name: Oveco of Oviedo. His origins are obscure, but he was probably a member of the Vela family, a brother of count Bermudo Núñez, and thus uncle of Fernando Bermúdez de Cea, who is known to have inherited property from Oveco. Oveco's had other brothers besides Bermudo: Vela, Suero, Munio and Nuño. His father, named Nuño, may be Nuño Ordóñez, a son of King Ordoño I of Asturias, or perhaps Nuño Vélaz, son of Vela Jiménez, the count of Álava. Oveco witnessed three different donations to the monastery of Sahagún in 945, his name being recorded three different ways: Ovecco Munniz, Obeco Muniz, and Ovecus episcopus.

Oveco was a deacon in 920, when he subscribed to a document of Sahagún. Around 937, Oveco led an expedition with his brother Vermudo to the region around of Salamanca, there to found new villages (repoblación) and consecrate new churches with the newly appointed bishop, Dulcidio II. In 953 Ordoño III donated all the settlements and churches founded by Oveco and his fellows to the diocese of León. Oveco founded a monastery in Vega, which passed to his nephew Fernando on his death.

== Sources ==
- Palomeque Torres, Antonio. 1955. "Episcopologio de las Sedes del Reino de León durante la décima centuria". Archivos Leoneses: Revista de estudios y documentación de los Reinos Hispano-Occidentales 18: 109–25.
- Salazar y Acha, Jaime de. 1985. "Una familia de la Alta Edad Media: Los Velas y su realidad historica". Estudios Genealógicos y Heráldicos. Madrid: Asociación Española de Estudios Genealógicos y Heráldicos..
- Sánchez-Albornoz, Claudio. 1934. Estampas de la vida en León durante el siglo X. Madrid.
- Torres Sevilla-Quiñones de León, Margarita Cecilia. 1999. Linajes nobiliarios de León y Castilla: Siglos IX–XIII. Salamanca: Junta de Castilla y León, Consejería de educación y cultura.
