= José Armando Bermúdez National Park =

National Park in the Dominican Republic

- IUCN category II (national park)
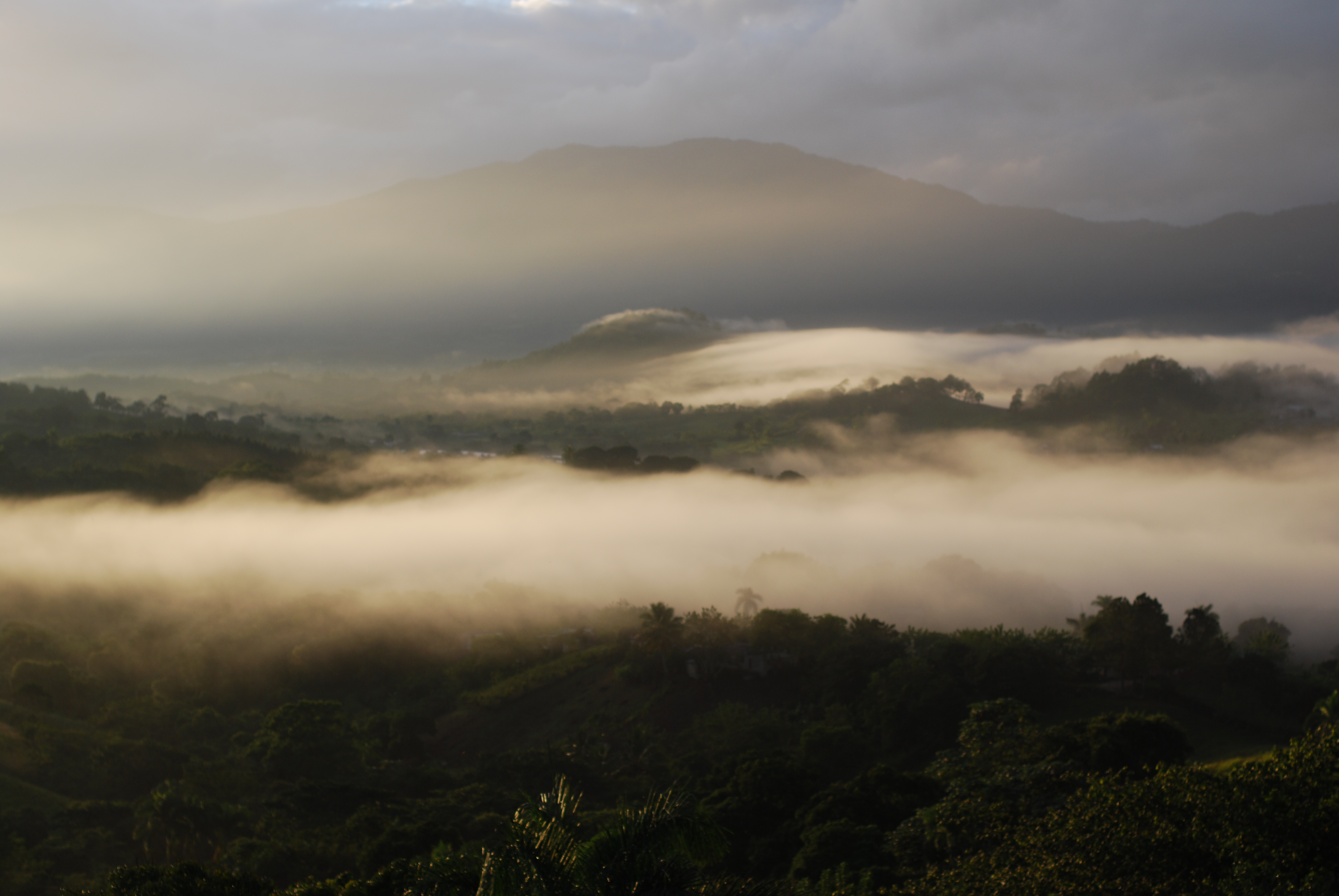
- View of the Cordillera Central where the park is located

- Location within the Dominican Republic
- Interactive map of José Armando Bermúdez National Park
- Location: San Juan, Santiago, and La Vega Province, Dominican Republic
- Coordinates: 19.176°N 71.050°W
- Area: 766 km^{2} (296 sq mi)
- Established: February 1956

José Armando Bermúdez National Park is a Dominican Republic National Park spanning the northern slopes and central portions of the Central Mountain Range.

The park is named after Dominican rum magnate José Armando Bermúdez Rochet, owner of Bermúdez.

Together with the National Park José del Carmen Ramírez, the two parks were established in February 1956. A highly elevated area, it is notable for cold and cool temperatures during most of the year (from −9 °C [16 °F] to 15 °C [59 °F]), despite being in a tropical country.

== Natural history ==
The range supports the Hispaniolan pine forests ecoregion, of the Tropical and subtropical coniferous forests Biome.

The forests flora of notable biodiversity has many native trees, shrubs, and ferns, including:

- Hispaniolan pine (Pinus occidentalis) — endemic to Hispaniola.
- Pale magnolia (Magnolia pallescens) — tree endemic to Hispaniola, IUCN Red List endangered species.
- West Indian mahogany (Swietenia mahagoni) — endemic to the Caribbean and southern Florida.
- Dominican butterfly bush (Buddleja domingensis) (syn. Buddleja calcicola) — endemic to Hispaniola.
