= Jesús Sanz Montes =

Spanish Roman Catholic prelate

Mgr Jesus Sanz Montes O.F.M.
- Archbishop of Oviedo
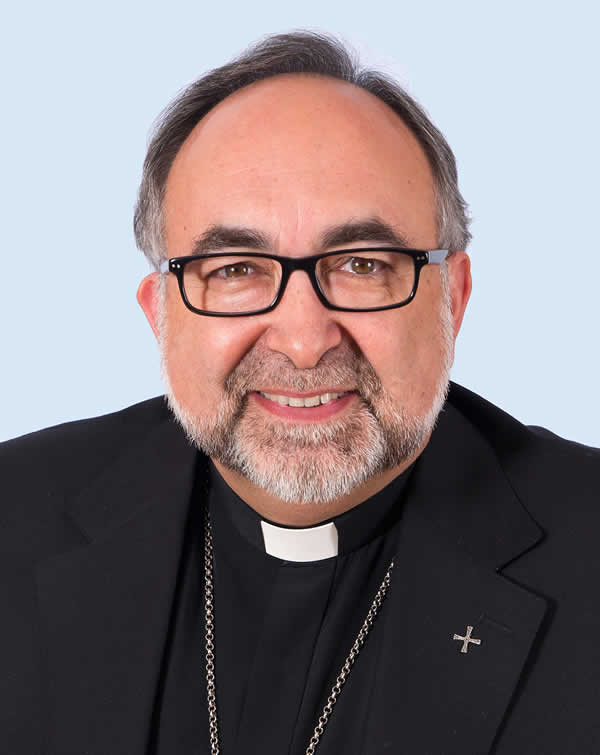
- Church: Roman Catholic
- Archdiocese: Oviedo
- Province: Oviedo
- Metropolis: Oviedo
- Diocese: Oviedo
- Appointed: 21 November 2009
- Installed: 30 January 2010
- Predecessor: Mgr Carlos Osoro Sierra
- Previous posts: Bishop of Huesca and Jaca (2003-2009)

Orders
- Ordination: 20 September 1986
- Consecration: 14 December 2003 by Antonio María Rouco Varela, Carlos Amigo Vallejo, and Elías Yanes Álvarez
- Rank: Archbishop

Personal details
- Born: 18 January 1955 (age 71) Madrid, Spain
- Education: Pontificia Universita Antonianum, Pontifical University of Salamanca
- Motto: Christus Omnia In Omnibus
- Coat of arms

Jesus Sanz Montes (born 18 January 1955) is a Spanish Roman Catholic prelate and Franciscan friar who has been Archbishop of Oviedo since 2010. He was bishop of both Huesca and Jaca from 2003 to 2009.

== Biography ==
Jesús Sanz Montes was born in Madrid on 18 January 1955. After working in a bank, he entered the seminary of Toledo, where he completed his studies in philosophy and theology. He entered the Franciscans and took his perpetual vows on 14 September 1985. He was ordained a priest on 20 September 1986. He obtained a licentiate in theology at the Pontifical University of Salamanca in 1992 and a doctorate in spiritual theology from the Pontifical Antonianum University of Rome in 1999.

He was rector of the Franciscan Seminary of Ávila from 1986 to 1991, bursar and provincial moderator for ongoing formation in the convent of San Antonio in La Cabrera from 1991 to 1994, guardian of the Forty Martyrs in Rome from 1994 to 1997, superior of San Juan de los Reyes in Toledo and provincial councilor of the Franciscan Province of Castile from 1997 to 2000, professor of theology at the San Dámaso Theological Faculty in Madrid from 1998 to 2003, director of the Secretariat of the Episcopal Commission for Consecrated Life from 2000 to 2003, superior of the Franciscan Fraternity of the Provincial Curia of Madrid from 2000 to 2003.

On 23 October 2003, Pope John Paul II appointed him bishop of the dioceses of Huesca and Jaca, united under him. He received his episcopal ordination on 14 December.

On 21 November 2009, Pope Benedict XVI named him Archbishop of Oviedo.
