= Gomelo II =

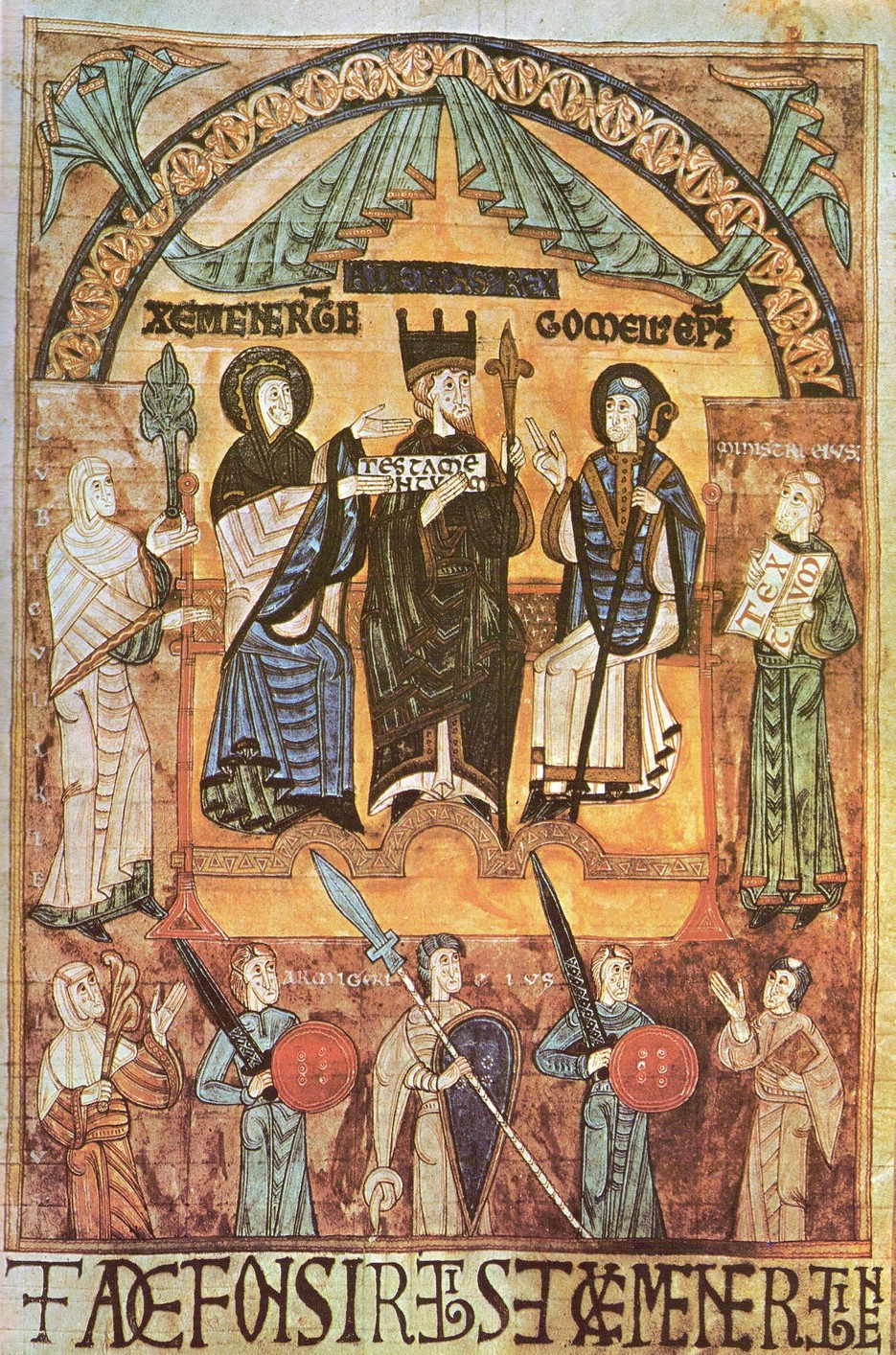
Miniature from the archives of Oviedo Cathedral showing Alfonso III of Asturias flanked by his queen, Jimena Garcés (left), and his bishop, Gomelo II (right). Above Gomelo is written GOMELL EPS, an abbreviation of Gomellus episcopus (bishop Gomelo).

Gomelo II (died 906×909) was the Bishop of Oviedo during the final years of the reign of Alfonso III of Asturias. He succeeded Hermenegild I probably about 892. Only one document from his episcopate survives, though it was later interfered with by Pelagius of Oviedo. Dated 20 January 905, it is charter of the Cathedral of San Salvador signed by a bishop Gomellus along with the bishops Froilán of León, Sisenand of Iria, Nausto of Coimbra, and Reccared of Lugo. The charter ordered the construction of a castle beside the church to house relics—and refugees—during Viking attacks. The cathedral also received as gifts books, ornaments, villages, monasteries, churches, and rents of all kinds, but the jurisdiction over the church of Santa María de Lugo and the towns of Avilés and Gijón also given appear to be later (forged) additions. A 1612 copy of this diploma was misdated 1 February 925, but the list of bishops confirms the date of the copy in the cartulary of Oviedo.

According to a later falsified document of bishop Pelagius of Oviedo, Alfonso III held a council at Oviedo in 899 or 900 and with the approval of a certain "Pope John" (perhaps John VIII was intended) raised Oviedo to metropolitan rank. A document dated 20 January 905 in Pelagius's Liber testamentorum records a large donation made by the monarch to the see of Oviedo and confirmed by Gomelo II. This document is strongly suspect.

| Preceded by Hermenegild I | Bishop of Oviedo; 892/99 – 906/9 | Succeeded by Flacinus |
