= Bermudo Núñez =

Bermudo Núñez (died c. 955) was a magnate from León and the first Count of Cea. He appears for the first time in 921 confirming a donation to the Monastery of San Benito in Sahagún from which it can be assumed that he was probably born near the end of the 9th century. A loyal vassal of the Leonese monarchs, he confirmed several royal charters and appears with the title of Count from at least the year 950, governing as a tenente the Cea region from 939 onwards.

He probably played a relevant role in the Battle of Simancas and after this victory of the Leonese troops, collaborated with his brother, Oveco Núñez, Bishop of León in the repoblación of Salamanca.

== Family origins ==
Although his filiation has not been confirmed, several hypotheses have been put forward. Medievalist scholar Margarita Torres Sevilla-Quiñones de León believes that he could have been the son of Nuño Ordóñez, a son of King Ordoño I of Asturias and brother of Alfonso III, which, according to the author, would explain the rapid rise of this lineage and its proximity to the royal house.

According to another hypothesis, proposed by genealogist Jaime de Salazar y Acha, Bermudo would have been the son of a Nuño Vélaz (or Vela), a son of Vela Jiménez, Count of Álava, through whom the Vela lineage spread throughout the Kingdom of León which would also explain the Basque-Navarrese names in subsequent generations. (Note: The name Vela and its various patronymics is of Visigothic origin.'"`UNIQ--ref-00000004-QINU`"')

Bishop Oveco Núñez in a charter dated 28 August 945, confirms several donations made by King Ramiro II of León to the Monastery of Sahagún, also confirming the charter his brothers Vela, Suero, Munio, Bermudo and Nuño Núñez, followed by some of the children of these brothers, including Fernando Bermúdez, son of Bermudo Núñez. He also had a sister named Gontrodo who married Ansur Fernández, Count of Monzón, the parents of Queen Teresa Ansúrez, wife of King Sancho I of León.

== Marriage and issue ==
Count Bermudo Núñez married twice. From his first marriage to Argilo, he was the father of:

- Froiloba Bermúdez, the first-born, married Muño Flaínez before 947.
- Fernando Bermúdez (died in 978), the second Count of Cea, inherited from his father and from his uncle Bishop Oveco.
- Piniolo Bermúdez, who confirms, with his brothers Fernando and Jimena, a donation made by his father on 13 August 949 to the Monastery of Santiago de Valdávida.
- Jimena Bermúdez
- Vela Bermúdez (died after March 976), the father of Argilo, Nuño, and of Count Bermudo Vela.

Between 947 and 949, he married Velasquita, with whom he had two sons:

- Álvaro Bermúdez
- Oveco Bermúdez

== Bibliography ==
- Calleja Puerta, Miguel (2001). El conde Suero Vermúdez, su parentela y su entorno social: La aristocracia asturleonesa en los siglos XI y XII (in Spanish). Oviedo: KRK Ediciones. ISBN 84-95401-68-1.
- Justi, Karl (1999). Velázquez y su siglo (in Spanish). Madrid: Ediciones Istmo. ISBN 84-7090-364-0.
- Salazar y Acha, Jaime de (1985). "Una Familia de la Alta Edad Media: Los Velas y su Realidad Histórica". Estudios Genealógicos y Heráldicos (in Spanish). Madrid: Asociación Española de Estudios Genealógicos y Heráldicos. ISBN 84-398-3591-4.
- Torres Sevilla-Quiñones de León, Margarita Cecilia (1999). Linajes nobiliarios de León y Castilla. Siglos IX-XIII (in Spanish). Salamanca: Junta de Castilla y León, Consejería de educación y cultura. ISBN 84-7846-781-5.
