= Francisco Bermúdez de Pedraza =

Spanish writer, jurist and historian

Francisco Bermúdez de Pedraza (1585–1655) was a Spanish writer, jurist and historian.

== Biography ==
After studying humanities and jurisprudence at the University of Granada, he joined the Royal Chancery of Granada as a lawyer around 1608, and after acquiring prestige he moved to Madrid, where he continued to practice law. He was ordained a priest in 1628 and appointed canon of the cathedral of Granada, of which he would be treasurer from 1635 until his death, which occurred when he was seventy years old. He also taught law at the university.
