= Guillermo Bermúdez =

Colombian architect (1924–1995)

Guillermo Bermúdez Umaña (February 1924, in Soacha – 31 May 1995, in Bogota) was a Colombian architect and professor of the National University of Colombia. His works are mainly private homes and public buildings, mostly in Bogota.

== Life ==
Guillermo Bermúdez Umaña was born in Soacha near Bogota in 1924. He studied architecture at the Pontificia Catholic University of Chile and the National University of Colombia, Bogota, and graduated in 1948. After graduation, he worked for the Ministry of Public Works of Colombia. A large majority of his works were made in his own office, in association with some projects with Pablo Lanzetta and Emilio Arango. He died in Bogota in 1995.
