= Rafael Bermúdez =

Uruguayan footballer (born 1978)

Personal information
- Full name: Rafael Julián Bermúdez
- Date of birth: 13 October 1978 (age 48)
- Place of birth: Montevideo, Uruguay
- Height: 1.76 m (5 ft 9 in)
- Position: Midfielder

Senior career*
Years	Team	Apps	(Gls)
1997-2003	Miramar Misiones		
2004	Sud América	15	(1)
2005	Unión San Felipe	7	(0)
2009–2010	Al Hilal		
- * Club domestic league appearances and goals

Rafael Julián Bermúdez (born 13 October 1978 in Montevideo) is a Uruguayan former professional footballer who played as a midfielder in Uruguay, Chile and Oman.

== Teams ==
- (Uruguay) Miramar Misiones 1997–2003
- (Uruguay) Sud América 2004
- (Chile) Unión San Felipe 2005
- (Oman) Al Hilal 2009–2010
