= Fernando Bermudez =

American wrongfully convicted of murder

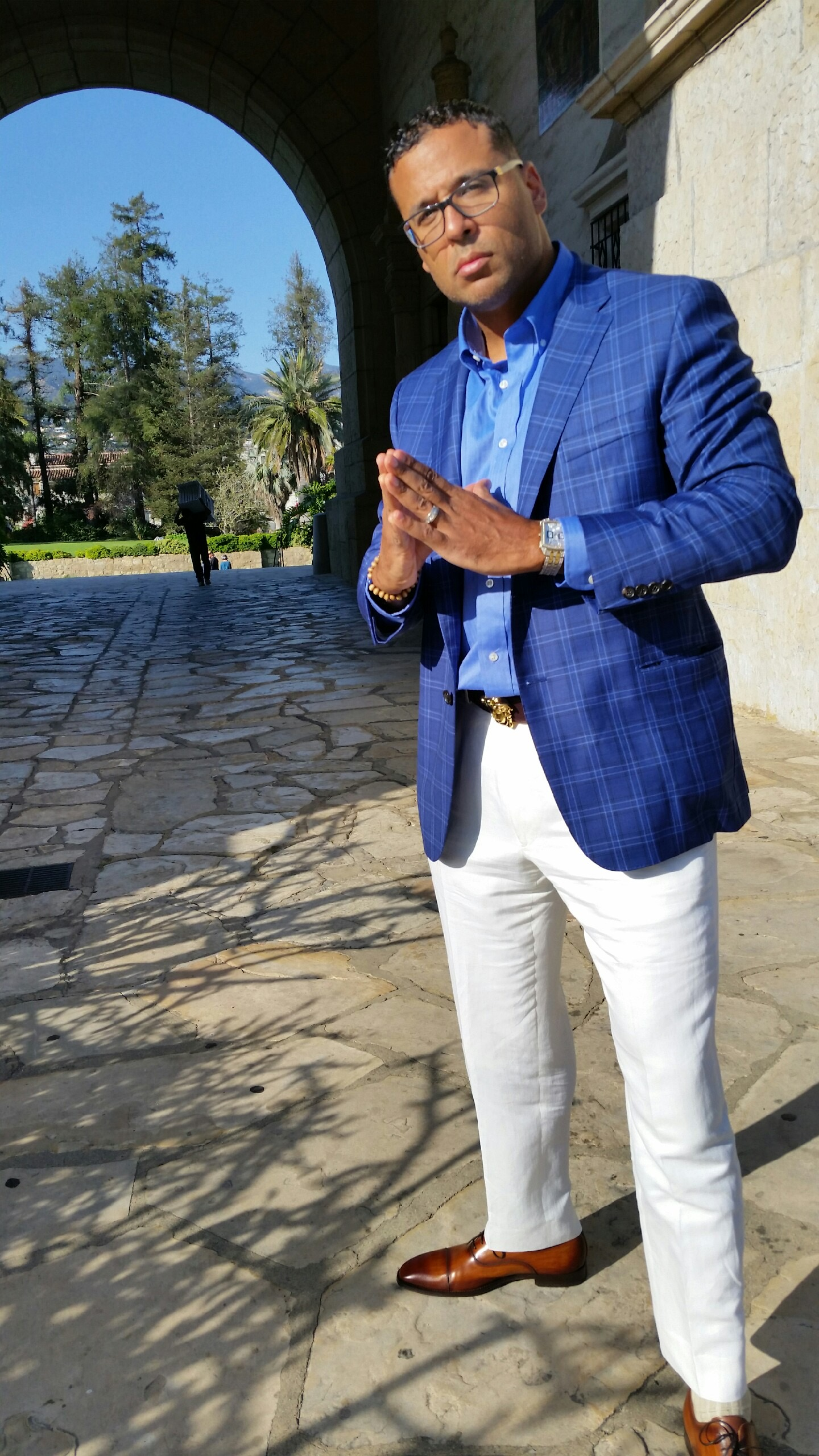
Bermudez in 2020

Fernando Bermudez (born February 13, 1969) is a New York City resident who was exonerated in 2009 after being convicted in 1992 of the second-degree murder of a 16-year-old boy in New York City's Greenwich Village. He was sentenced to 23 years to life. In 2009, his conviction was overturned on appeal by a New York County Supreme Court justice who also ordered Bermudez released, and dismissed the charges with prejudice.

== See also ==
- List of wrongful convictions in the United States
