= Veremund =

- King of the Suevi
- Reign: c. 500
- Predecessor: Hermeneric
- Successor: Theodemund

Timeline of the Suebic Kings

Veremund or Veremundus (later vernacular Vermudo or Bermudo) was a Suevic king of Galicia around 500. His existence is conjectured on the basis of a sixth-century inscription discovered at Salvador de Vairão. The date in the inscription is interpreted as either 485 or 535. Some scholars have dated the inscription to the eighth century, arguing that the Veremundus of the inscription is King Bermudo I of Asturias.

Veremund's reign would fall within a period of obscurity for the region of Galicia following the death of the valuable chronicler Hydatius (469) and the Sueves' conversion to Arianism (466). If the king existed, he was undoubtedly an Arian.

== Sources ==
- Arias, Jorge C. "Identity and Interactions: The Suevi and the Hispano-Romans." University of Virginia: Spring 2007.
- Collins, Roger. Visigothic Spain, 409–711. Oxford: Blackwell Publishing, 2004. ISBN 0-631-18185-7.
- Ferreiro, Alberto. "Veremundu R(eg)e: revisiting an inscription from San Salvador de Vairão (Portugal)." Zeitschrift für Papyrologie und Epigraphik 116 (1997), 263–72.
- Thompson, E. A. "The End of Roman Spain: Part III." Nottingham Mediaeval Studies, xxii (1978), pp. 3–22. Reprinted in Romans and Barbarians: The Decline of the Western Empire. Madison: University of Wisconsin Press, 1982. pp. 161–187. ISBN 0-299-08700-X. See p. 167 for Rechimund.
- Thompson, E. A. "The Conversion of the Spanish Suevi to Catholicism." Visigothic Spain: New Approaches. ed. Edward James. Oxford: Oxford University Press, 1980. ISBN 0-19-822543-1.

Preceded by Hermeneric	King of Galicia fl. c. 485	Succeeded by Theodemund
