= Fernando Bermúdez de Cea =

10th-century Leonese nobleman

Fernando Bermúdez (died c. 978), second Count of Cea, was the son of Bermudo Núñez and his wife Argilo. (Note: Fernando confirms two donations made by his father, in 949 and in 955, signing as Fredinanduns prolis, that is, the son of Fernando.) As the father of a queen of Navarre, and therefore, ancestor of many royal houses, Fernando was a distinguished member of the highest ranks of the nobility of the Kingdom of León.

== Biographical sketch ==
The firstborn of count Bermudo Núñez, he inherited many properties from his father and also from his uncle Oveco Núñez, Bishop of León, and appears as Fredenando Vermudiz in a donation made on 28 August 945 by the bishop to the Monastery of Sahagún. The relationship is also confirmed in a charter dated 984 when it mentions that this monastery had acquired a certain property from count Fernando Bermúdez that had previously belonged to the bishop.

He spent his first years in Asturias where he had vast holdings, some of which had been donated by Queen Urraca, the widow of King Fruela II of Asturias, and by the Infantes Ramiro and Ordoño Froilaz, as attested in an inventory of various properties in Naptavlio that were probably given as compensation for his support of King Fruela and for having participated in the rebellion in 932 against King Ramiro II who forced Fernando to return two churches to the Cathedral of Oviedo. His relations with the crown improved during the reign of King Ordoño III. He was the mayordomo mayor of this king, confirmed many of his royal charters as an active member of the curia regis, and appears for the first time in 960 with the title of "Count". His last appearance in medieval charters was in 978.

== Marriage and issue ==
He married Elvira Díaz, daughter of Diego Muñoz, count of Saldaña, and his wife Tregidia. (Note: On 30 November 973 he appears with his wife Elvira making a donation to the Monastery of Sahagún which was confirmed by his sons Pedro and Gómez. On 27 March 976, Fernando confirms the will of his brother Vela, ante comite Fernando Vermuiz et de sua mulier domna Gelvira et ante suos filios qui omnes confirmant Petro Fernandiz, Gomez Fernandiz.) They were the parents of:

- Pedro Fernández (died ca. 1028), the third Count of Cea and lacking a male heir, the agnate line of the counts of Cea was extinguished. With his wife, Sancha Muñoz, he had only one daughter named Elvira Pérez.
- Gómez Fernández (died before 978), was the husband of Onecca and father of Countess Onecca Gómez, wife of Count Fortún who was most likely a member of the royal house of Pamplona. He was probably the father of Fernando and Rodrigo Gómez. (Note: Author Salazar y Acha (1985), p. 37, mentions an Onecca who he believes could have been the daughter of either Gotina or Elvira, both daughters of Count Fernando Bermúdez de Cea. Nevertheless, she was actually the daughter of Gómez. In 1062, Countess Onecca donates a village to the Monasterio de Vega where she states that she had this inheritance from her mother Onecca and from her grandfather count Fernando Bermúdez. The Onecca who makes this donation in 1062, granddaughter of Fernando, was the wife of Fortún, possibly Garcés, and mother of a García Fortúñez who died before 1062.)
- Gotina Fernández, the wife of Count Pelayo Rodríguez.
- Jimena Fernández, Queen consort as the wife of King García Sánchez II and mother of King Sancho III of Navarre.
- Justa Fernández, the first wife of Count Flaín Muñoz.
- Elvira Fernández.

== Bibliography ==
- Salazar y Acha, Jaime de (1985). Una Familia de la Alta Edad Media: Los Velas y su Realidad Histórica (en Estudios Genealógicos y Heráldicos) (in Spanish). Asociación Española de Estudios Genealógicos y Heráldicos. ISBN 84-398-3591-4.
- Torres Sevilla-Quiñones de León, Margarita Cecilia (1999). Linajes nobiliarios de León y Castilla: Siglos IX-XIII (in Spanish). alamanca: Junta de Castilla y León, Consejería de educación y cultura. ISBN 84-7846-781-5.
