= Fernando Antonio Bermúdez Arias =

Venezuelan medical doctor, author (1933–2007)

Dr. Fernando Bermúdez Arias
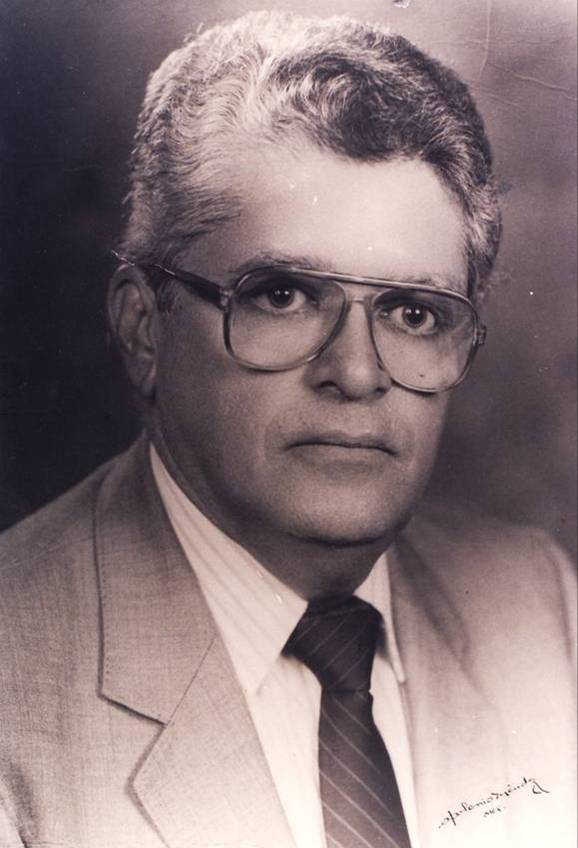
- Bermúdez Arias while in Mexico (1975)
- Born: 30 May 1933; San Cristobal, Tachira, Venezuela
- Died: 10 December 2007 (aged 74); Maracaibo
- Education: University of Zulia
- Known for: Cardiology, Literature and Humanism
- Awards: Order of Andrés Bello, Venezuela's Health Cross, Scientific Activities Award at the X Interamerican Congress of Cardiology
- Scientific career
- Fields: Medicine, Cardiology, Science, Spiritism, Poetry, Philosophy.
- Workplaces: Hospital Anti-Tuberculoso de Maracaibo, Policlinica Maracaibo, University of Zulia, Venezuelan Atherosclerosis Association

Fernando Antonio Bermúdez Arias (30 May 1933 – 10 December 2007) is one of Venezuela's most prolific doctor, cardiologist, scientist, writer, teacher, historian, artist and social defender. Born in San Cristobal – Tachira State, he spent most of his life in Maracaibo, Zulia State, Venezuela.

== Early life ==
Only son of Soledad Arias de Bermudez (Merchant and Teacher) and Eduardo Bermúdez (Tax Accountant). Fernando Antonio Bermúdez Arias was born in the Venezuelan Andes (City of San Cristóbal, Táchira). His family moved to Caracas and then to Maracaibo in 1940, searching for better work opportunities. He first attended elementary school at Escuela Experimental Venezuela and then in Maracaibo at the Instituto Pestalozziano (1941–1947) and finally at Maracaibo's traditional Udon Perez elementary school (1947–1952).

== Academic background ==
He enrolled in Venezuela's Central University (Universidad Central de Venezuela) for his first three years of medical school and then at University of Zulia (Universidad del Zulia) where he graduated as a surgeon (July 26, 1958).

While attending medical school, he volunteered at the Pathology anatomy service at Maracaibo's Sanatorio Antituberculoso and at the Cardiology service at the hospital Dr. Urquinaona. He finally served as a resident at the Coromoto's Hospital up to July 1960.

He applied for a scholarship, which he won, from Venezuela's public health system (Ministerio de Sanidad y Asistencia Social de Venezuela) to study in Mexico City - Mexico where he specialized as cardiologist at the National Autonomous University of Mexico (UNAM). During his studies in Mexico he was mentored by Doctor Ignacio Chavez Sanchez (one of the most prominent physicians in Mexican history).

While in Mexico he also enrolled at the Phonocardiography and Hemodynamics Service Unit and attended several courses on medical nephropathy, clinical cardiology, superior electrocardiography and external graphical registry.

Given the outstanding performance and effort of his pursuits and their positive impact on the medical community, he is named a correspondent member of the Mexican Cardiology Society (October 15. 1962). He was also appointed as a member of the interns and scholars society at the National Institute of Cardiology of Mexico. Fernando Bermúdez Arias completed his Medical Degree by November 30. 1962.

== Professional career ==
Among other highlights of his professional career he:

Was Associate physician at the Central Hospital for the Cardiology services and Blood Bank, physician at the organization for student's protection at Zulia State University (LUZ) and associate physician at Maracaibo's Sanatorio Antituberculoso. After his studies in Mexico he was appointed as fellow physician at the Cardiology services of the Sanatorio Antituberculoso.

In 1966 Fernando Bermúdez Arias obtained his Doctorate in Medical Science, marked by the completion of his thesis entitled "Interatrial Communication, Clinical Correlation, Phonomecanography, Hemodynamic and Surgical in twelve patients" ("Comunicacion Interauricular, Correlacion Clinica, Fonomecanografia, Hemodinamia y Quirurgica en doce pacientes").

In 1968 he also became a member of the Fellow American College of Chest Physicians in the United States of America.

Fernando Bermúdez Arias founded several medical services and medical labs: a Phonocardiography laboratory (1963), a Hemodynamic laboratory (1966) and three Echocardiograph services (1972) in Maracaibo's Central Hospital, Maracaibo's South General Hospital and at Policlinica Maracaibo. He had a private office at Policlinica Maracaibo where he practiced Cardiology for over 32 consecutive years.

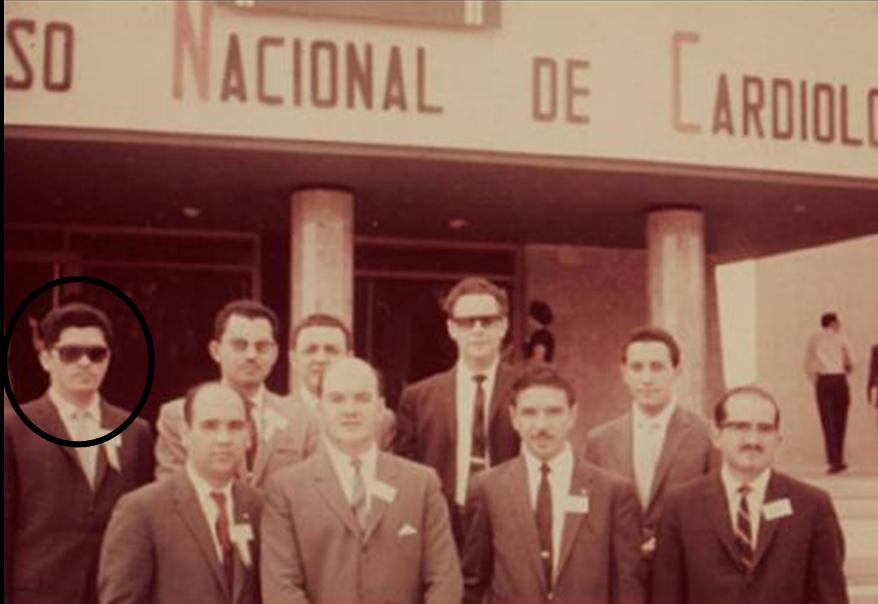
National Congress of Cardiology in Mexico-1972

Among his prominent scientific activities are: several studies on pediatric preparation, infant radiology and medical hypnotism.

Was a very active participant in medical and scientific events at a national and international level. He participated in over 200 scientific congresses and related events. He published more than 150 investigative studies and was guest speaker of over 200 conferences. Among other scientific studies, the most note-worthy are: "La Cinecoronariografía Selectiva", "Doble Fistula Coronaria Derecha a Ventriculo Izquierdo" (first Works on this subject in Zulia State -1972), and "El enfermo Funcional en Cardiologia" (1981).

In 1983 he coordinated a round table on Isquemic Cardiopathy in the 2nd Biannual meeting of the Zulia State Medical Academy.

He also created the 'F-Cap diet': Chronobiologic, antirust, polarizing (hypo-sodic and hyper-potassium)

Was a professor at the Zulia State University (LUZ), teaching "History of Medicine" (1985–1991). He also served as adviser for several postgraduate and Clinical Cardiological studies in the area of Biochemistry.

Participated as a vocal member of the Venezuelan Atherosclerosis Association (AVA) from 1992 to 1994. Then, from 1996 to 2000, he served as vice-president and from 2000 to 2003 as President of the institution. He also founded the Zulia State chapter of the Venezuelan Atherosclerosis Association – Zulia (AVA-Zulia).

Worked mentor of electrocardiography at the Cardiology postgraduate course at the Zulia State University (LUZ). He was active participant at the biochemistry-metabolic Dr. Felix Gomez (CIEM) research center in Maracaibo.

Dr. Fernando Bermúdez Arias was permanent member of the Venezuelan Cardiologist Society and was an active collaborator for its Zulia State Chapter. He also belonged to the Venezuelan Critics Society, the SIBIC of Mexico, the Venezuelan Agiology Society, National Society of Medicine History and served as president and founder of the Zulian Center of Medicine History (1984–1986).

On November 20, 2003, Dr. Fernando Bermúdez Arias is given the honor to have a "Permanent correspondent seat (Seat No. 13) at the Venezuelan National Academy of Medicine" after the presentation of his work "La recuperacion del Miocardio Hibernado mejora el pronostico de la Cardiopatía Isquémica Metabolica". He was also an emeritus member of the Zulia State Medical Academy. He was also an honorary member, as a physician, of the Honorable Auronautical Fire Fighters Institution - Zulia State.

He also was a prolific writer and belonged to the Venezuelan Writers Association, writing over 20 books. Among his most outstanding titles are:

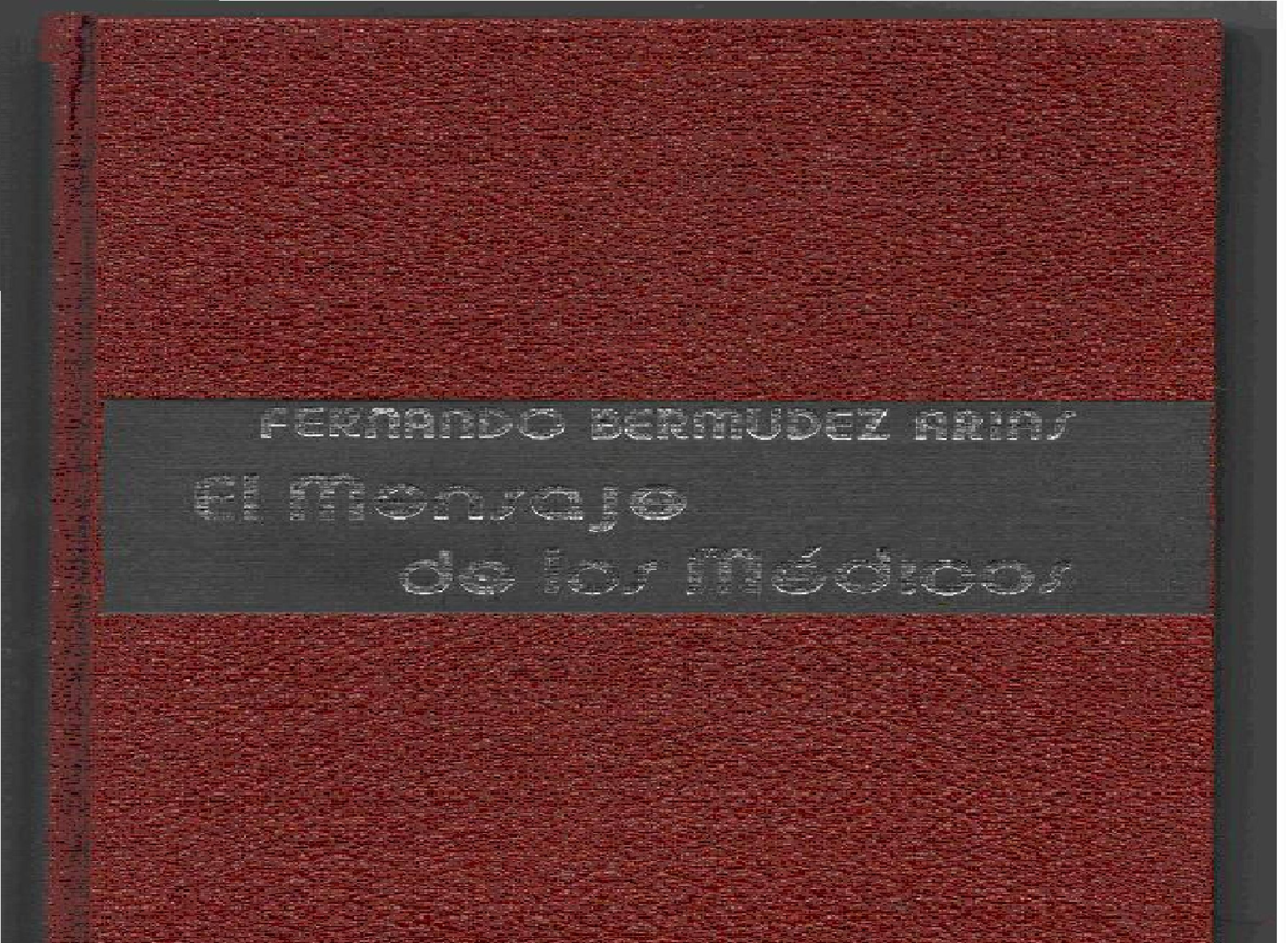
Picture of the Book "El mensaje de los Médicos", Mendez Oteo Editor-1982

- Angina de Pecho e infarto al miocardio. Diagnostico, prevencion y tratamiento.
- El enfermo funcional en cardiologia. Un enfoque psicosomatico.
- Conozca y cuide su Corazon.
- Las miocardiopatias.
- Forjadores de una historia. Autores medicina y universidad del Zulia.
- Medicina sin fronteras.
- El mundo desconocido de la Alimentacion.
- Electrocardiografia Diagnostica.
- Cuenca y la Cardiologia Zuliana: Pioneros en Venezuela.
- El mensaje de los Medicos.
- Cardiopatia Isquemica.

== Awards and recognitions ==
Among other awards and recognitions Dr. Fernando Bermúdez Arias received:

- Luis Razetti Award (1966)
- Dr. Adolfo D´Empaire Award (1978 and 1980)
- Joaquín Esteva Parra (1976 y en 1981)
- Order of Andrés Bello
- Health Cross (Cruz de la Sanidad)
- Health Merit (Mérito en Salud)
- Scientific Activities Award at the X Interamerican Congress of Cardiology – Honorific Mention (Premio Actividades Cientificas del X Congreso Interamericano de Cardiologia - Mencion Honorifica)
- Zulia State Legislation Award - 1976 (Premio de la Asamblea Legislativa del Estado Zulia – 1976)

== Family ==
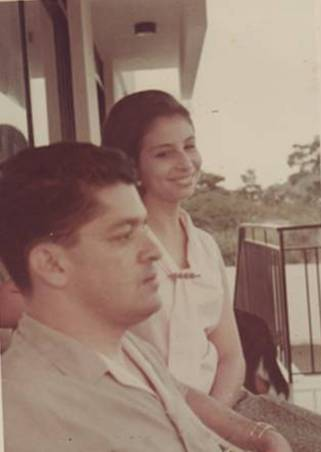
Fernando Bermúdez Arias with his wife Ma. Cristina Caravia Andrade-1963

While in Mexico, Fernando Bermúdez Arias met Maria Cristina Caravia Andrade, who would be his wife for over 40 years. They married in May 1963, and established permanent residence in Maracaibo, Venezuela. They had three children: Sara Angelica, Carlos Francisco and Alejandro Jose Bermúdez Caravia.

Fernando Bermúdez Arias died from kidney failure on December 10, 2007. His remains rest in Maracaibo, Zulia State at the Jardines La Chinita cemetery.

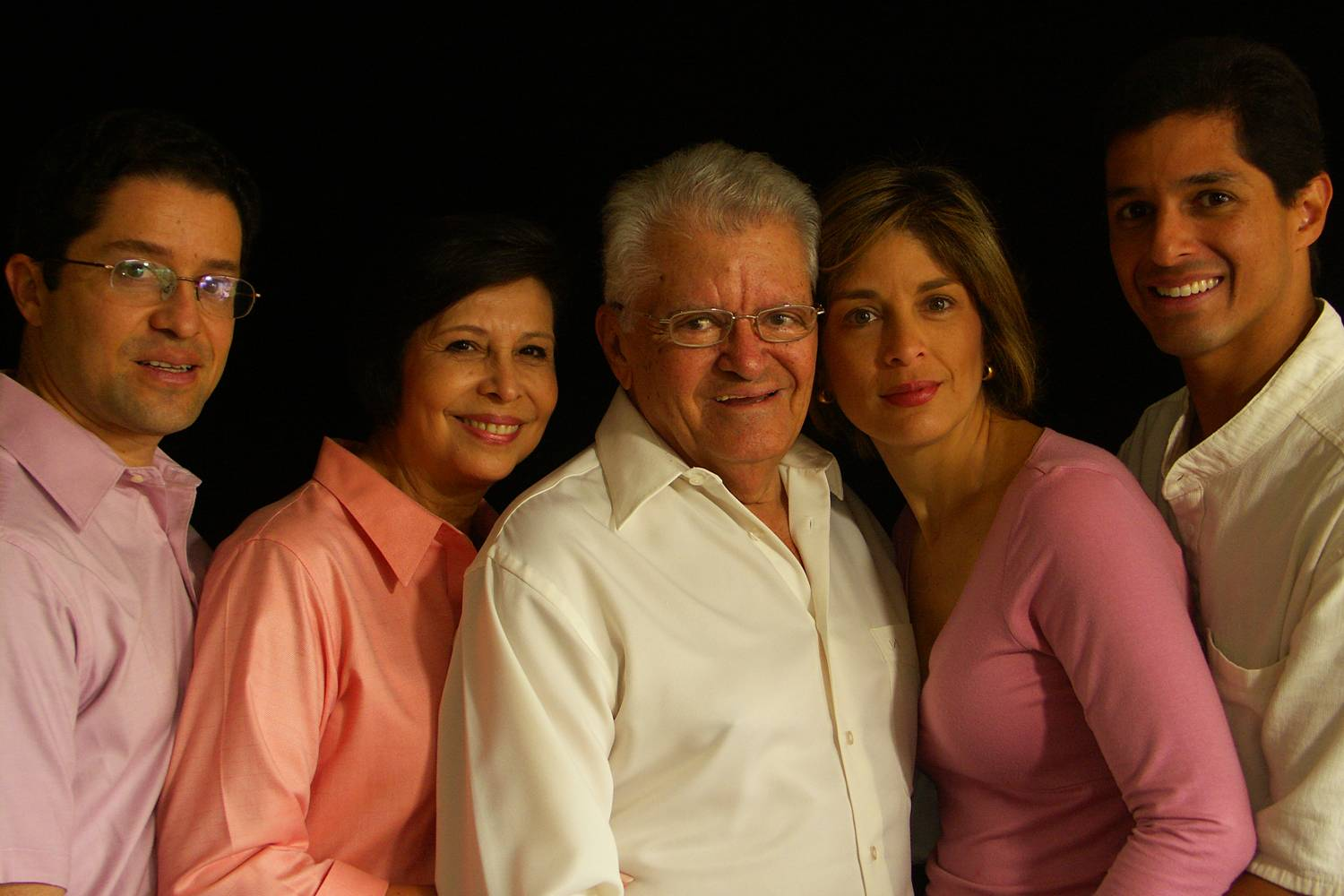
Fernando Bermúdez Arias with his Family-2006
