= Juan de Bermúdez =

Spanish explorer

Juan Bermúdez
- Born: Juan Bermúdez c. 1450; Palos de la Frontera, Province of Huelva, Crown of Castile
- Died: c. 1520; Governorate of Cuba
- Occupation: Navigator
- Known for: Discovered Bermuda and namesake of the island

Juan de Bermúdez (/bɜːrˈmjuːdɛz/; Spanish: [beɾˈmuðeθ]; born c. 1450, died c. 1520) was a Spanish navigator of the 16th century, and the namesake for the island country Bermuda.

== Early life ==
Juan Bermúdez was born in Palos de la Frontera, Province of Huelva, Crown of Castile.

== Voyages ==
In 1503, while sailing back to Spain from a provisioning voyage to Hispaniola in the ship La Garça, he discovered Bermuda (historically rendered by various authors as la Bermuda (Peter Martyr d'Anghiera on his map of 1511), Barmvdas or Bermudas (Sylvester Jordain in A DISCOVERY OF THE BARMVDAS, OTHERWISE called the Ile of DIVELS, London, 1610), Bermoodos (John Jacob Berlu in The Treasury of Drugs Unlock'd, London, 1690), Bermoothes (William Shakespeare, borrowing the name for a fictional island in his 1611 play The Tempest), Bermudes (Henry Chatelain in the 1720 edition of his Atlas Historique, Bellin of Paris in his map of 1764, and various others) which was later named after him. Legatio Babylonica, published in 1511 by Peter Martyr d'Anghiera, lists "La Bermuda" among the Atlantic islands. In 1515 he returned to Bermuda, landing a dozen pigs and sows for any unlucky mariners who might later be castaway there.

Bermúdez made 11 registered trips to the New World from 1495 to 1519. Among those, he was the captain of the Santa Cruz on Columbus's third voyage to the Indies.
