= Bermúdez (rum) =

Dominican liquor

J. Armando Bermúdez & Co.
- Type: Private
- Industry: Distilled beverages
- Founded: 1852
- Founder: Erasmo Bermúdez Jiménez
- Headquarters: Santiago de los Caballeros, Dominican Republic
- Key people: Marc Casablancas Vilanova (General Manager)
- Products: Rum
- Website: www.ronbermudez.com

J. Armando Bermúdez & Co., S.A., known as Bermúdez, is the oldest commercial rum distillery in the Dominican Republic. It was founded in 1852 by Venezuelan immigrant Erasmo Bermúdez Jiménez, originally producing medicinal bitters. The distillery is located in Santiago de los Caballeros, and continues to be family-owned, producing light Spanish-style rums from molasses. Bermúdez, along with Brugal and Barceló, are collectively known as the three B's.

== History ==
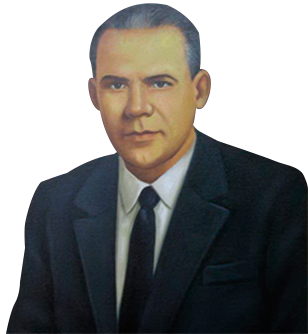
Domingo Octavio Bermúdez

Bermúdez was founded in 1852 by Erasmo Bermúdez Jiménez, a 24-year-old immigrant from Villa de Cura, Aragua, Venezuela who in 1850 fled the conflict that later became the Federal War. As Bermúdez had studied medicine, originally his company produced bitters known as Amargo Panacea, intended as a medicine, but later used as an aperitif. This transitioned the company to producing liquors and liqueurs, with La Sin Rival Fábrica de Licores (The Unrivaled Liquor Factory), a distillery that Erasmo Bermúdez Jiménez opened with his son, Aquiles Bermúdez Rochet, becoming the oldest commercial rum distillery in the Dominican Republic. However, La Sin Rival was burnt down in 1863 during the War of Restoration, but was rebuilt using compensation from the Spanish.

In 1897, José Armando Bermúdez Rochet, son of Erasmo Bermúdez Jiménez, purchased La Sin Rival and continued producing rum, though his son, José Ignacio Bermúdez Ramos, was listed as the legal proxy. During this period, the company produced Cidra, El Toro, and Palo Viejo rums in large quantities, among other liquors, and employed twelve employees, fifty operators, and used machinery powered by electricity. José Armando Bermúdez Rochet also owned a six-thousand-acre plantation in Banegas, Villa González, as well as equipment for the production of sugar and molasses. In 1900, his brother Manuel María Felipe Bermúdez Rochet opened a new distillery, though despite also distilling molasses, his business focused on high-grade rectified spirit.

In 1927, La Sin Rival transitioned to a Sociedad Anónima (S.A.), issuing shares which are private subscription and not traded publicly, and Domingo Octavio Bermúdez Ramos, son of José Armando Bermúdez Rochet, became the first administrator. As administrator, he oversaw the modernization of the company's facilities. From 1993, the company has been run by Carlos Alberto "Carlucho" Bermúdez Pippa, nephew of Domingo Octavio Bermúdez Ramos and fourth-generation Bermúdez distiller. Since 1997, Carlucho Bermúdez and his brother, Manuel José Cabral Tavárez, faced civil and criminal litigation for falsifying documents in order to defraud the Batlle Bermúdez branch of the family of 24.23% of their shares in the Bermúdez rum company, worth millions of pesos. After 19 years of litigation, in 2016 the brothers were acquitted due to lack of evidence.

== In Dominican culture ==
The Bermúdez family is currently one of approximately twenty wealthy families which dominate the Dominican economy. José Armando Bermúdez National Park, named for José Armando Bermúdez Rochet, was established in 1956.

== Production ==
Bermúdez rum is made from molasses, a byproduct of sugar production. It is diluted with water, then fermented for 1-2 days producing a wine of 7-9% ABV. The wine is distilled to a high proof, neutral spirit, creating a light alcohol typical of Spanish-style rum production. This spirit is then aged in ex-bourbon, ex-wine, or ex-sherry barrels.

== Products ==
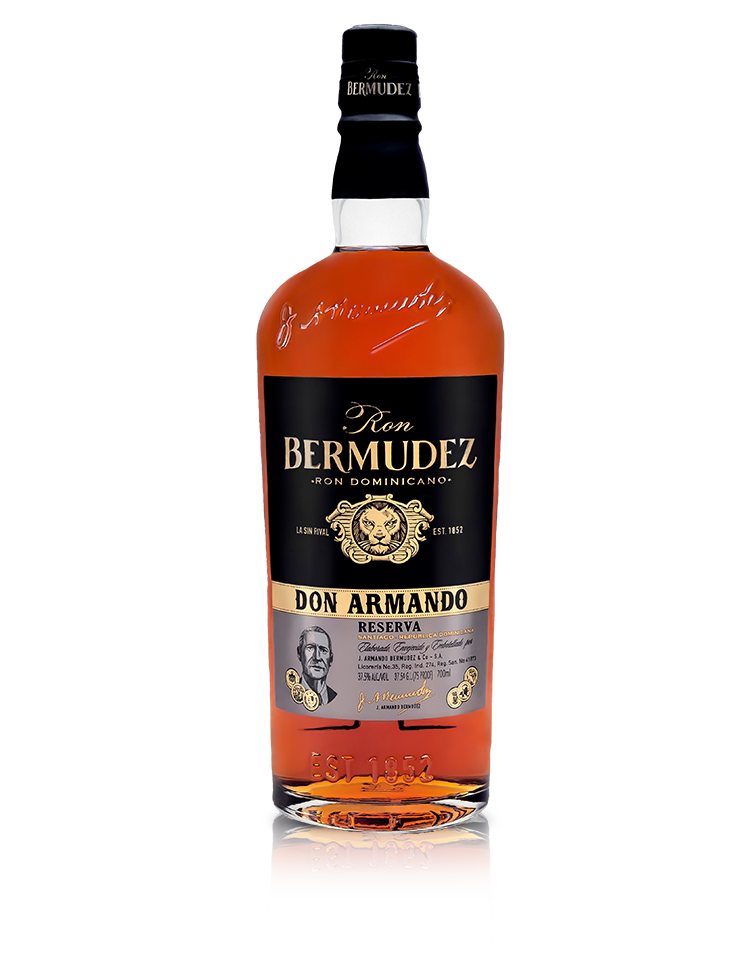
Bermúdez Don Armando rum

- Blanco Superior - An aged rum which has been double filtered to remove color.
- Dorado Superior - An aged gold rum.
- Ron Viejo - An aged gold rum.
- Reserva Especial - A blend of rums aged up to 5 years in oak barrels.
- Añejo Selecto - A blend of rums aged up to 7 years in oak barrels.
- Don Armando - A blend of rums aged up to 10 years in oak barrels.
- Aniversario 1852 - The flagship rum of the distillery.
- 151 - A white rum at 75.5% ABV.

Bermúdez also supplies the rums for the brand Kirk and Sweeney.
