= Sonia Bermúdez (thanatologist) =

Colombian thanatologist

- Born: Sonia Marina Bermúdez Robles c. 1955
- Occupation: Thanatologist

Sonia Marina Bermúdez Robles (c. 1955) is a Colombian forensic thanatologist. She is the founder of the organization "Gente como Uno" in Riohacha, dedicated to offering burial to the deceased who could not access official funeral services due to precarious economic conditions, including Venezuelan migrants. The organization has buried more than 600 people, and for its work, she has been recognized by the United Nations High Commissioner for Refugees and the United Nations.

== Biography ==
Bermúdez began dealing with corpses at the age of fourteen when she accompanied her father, who was the caretaker of the central cemetery in Riohacha, capital of the department of La Guajira. She later learned to perform autopsies, then studied and went to work at the Institute of Forensic Medicine of La Guajira. Bermúdez worked as a forensic thanatologist at the Institute for 36 years, beginning in 1978, where she is currently a pensioner, and has performed more than 5,000 necropsies.

In Bogotá, she took a course in thanatopraxy, the set of practices and techniques for presenting corpses. Sonia began performing autopsies in the 1980s, when the Riohacha morgue received unclaimed bodies and disfigured victims of Colombia's internal conflict who were unrecognizable. The authorities usually disposed of the bodies in a mass grave, where they were buried naked and without coffins; however, Bermúdez made the decision to dig graves for unclaimed dead from her town in an empty lot belonging to the municipality.

In 1995 the city hall gave her a valuable piece of land and in 1996 Sonia founded the organization Gente como Uno (People as One), starting a cemetery at kilometer 10 on the Riohacha-Valledupar road, on the road to the south of La Guajira, where she buries people who could not access official funeral services due to their precarious economic conditions, especially Venezuelan migrants from the northern part of the country, as well as the unknown dead who die far from their families, the "NN". At first she buried the dead in the ground and then exhumed them, but since 2007 she began to build cement vaults, where in addition to collecting and transporting the bodies in her truck, she prepares them, buries them and even mourns them in the company of their loved ones. Sonia has received more than 600 deceased since she started the project, in at least 30 years.

For her work she has received public recognition from the United Nations High Commissioner for Refugees (UNHCR), an organization that has donated cement and bricks so that she can continue adding vaults to her cemetery. According to Federico Sersale, head of UNHCR for La Guajira, the agency does not normally look after the rights of the deceased, but they saw the need to do so when they heard Sonia's story because no other organization was addressing the situation.

In 2020 she was recognized by the United Nations (UN), which chose 75 people around the world to highlight those who "build society through their social legacy" for the commemoration of the organization's 75th anniversary. Sonia's story was one of the twelve prioritized by Humanity House, in the Netherlands, to make up a photographic exhibition.
