= Andrés Bermúdez Viramontes =

Mexican politician

- Born: 2 July 1950; Jerez de García Salinas, Zacatecas, Mexico
- Died: 5 February 2009 (aged 58); Houston, Texas, United States
- Occupations: Businessman and politician
- Political party: PRD (2001–2004); PAN (2004–2009)

Andrés Bermúdez Viramontes (2 July 1950 – 5 February 2009) was a Mexican agricultural businessman and politician from the National Action Party (PAN) who formerly belonged to the Party of the Democratic Revolution (PRD). He was known as "the Tomato King".

From 2006 to 2009, he served in the Chamber of Deputies during the 60th Congress, representing Zacatecas's second district for the PAN, and from 2004 to 2007, he was municipal president of Jerez de García Salinas, in the state of Zacatecas.

Bermúdez Viramontes died while still a member of the Chamber of Deputies on 5 February 2009. His seat was taken by his substitute, Federico Bernal Frausto, for the remainder of his term.
