= José Armando Bermúdez =

José Armando Bermúdez Rochet (28 April 1871 – 4 October 1941) was a Dominican Republic businessman and the founder of J. Armando Bermúdez & Co., C. por A. The José Armando Bermúdez National Park is named in his honour.

== History ==
Born on 28 April 1871, to Erasmo Bermúdez Jiménez (1825–1907), a Venezuelan immigrant, and Petronila Rochet Gómez (1839–1889), the daughter of a French immigrant of Belgian Walloon and French descent.

In 1899, he married Ana Luisa Ramos de Peña and begat six children, all males: José Ignacio (1899–1968), Aquiles (1901–1970), Domingo Octavio (1902–1967), Luis Francisco "Frank" (1904–1949), Víctor Manuel "Tontón" (1906–1959) and Fernando Arturo (1909–1955).

Bermúdez died on 4 October 1941.
