= Manuel Risco =

Spanish historian

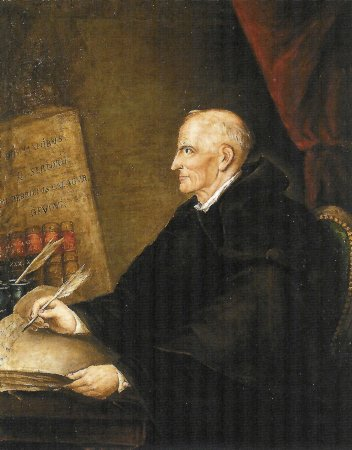
A portrait of Juan Manuel Martínez Ugarte (1827-1829), by Rosa Ruiz de la Prada. RAH.

Juan Manuel Martínez Ugarte (1 June 1735 – 30 April 1801), known as Manuel Risco or Padre Risco, was a Spanish historian. He wrote, edited, and published 13 volumes of the España Sagrada, the history of the Catholic Church in Spain.

== Biography ==
Born at Haro, he took the Augustinian habit at the Convento de Nuestra Señora del Risco in the Diocese of Ávila. He studied at the University of Salamanca and was a disciple of Enrique Flórez, who took him along with him on his voyages of historical research. On Flórez's death, Risco took over the unfinished Church history of Spain, España Sagrada. By then he was Jefe de Estudios at the Convento de Doña María de Aragón. He published thirteen volumes of the España Sagrada, from thirty to forty-two, inclusive. In 1800 ill health forced him to resign from the project and he ended his days at the Monasterio de San Felipe el Real in Madrid. He was replaced by Juan Fernández de Rojas from the same monastery.
