= Bernardino López de Carvajal =

Spanish cardinal

His Eminence Bernardino López de Carvajal
- Bishop of Plasencia
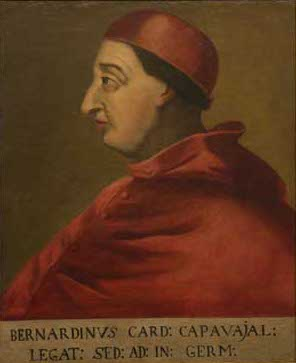
- Diocese: Plasencia
- See: Plasencia
- Appointed: 14 January 1521
- Term ended: 16 December 1523
- Predecessor: Gómez de Toledo Solís
- Successor: Gutierre de Vargas Carvajal
- Other post: Cardinal-Bishop of Ostia e Velletri
- Previous posts: Bishop of Astorga (1488–1489); Bishop of Badajoz (1489–1493); Bishop of Cartagena (1493–1495); Cardinal-Priest of Santi Marcellino e Pietro (1493–1495); Bishop of Sigüenza (1495–1511); Cardinal-Priest of Santa Croce in Gerusalemme (1495–1507); Administrator of Avellino-Frigento (1503–1505); Titular Patriarch of Jerusalem (1503–1511); Cardinal-Bishop of Albano (1507); Cardinal-Bishop of Frascati (1507–1508); Administrator of Rossano (1508–1519); Cardinal-Bishop of Palestrina (1508–1509); Cardinal-Bishop of Sabina (1509–1511); Bishop of Sigüenza (1513–1519); Cardinal-Bishop of Sabina (1513–1521); Titular Patriarch of Jerusalem (1513–1523)

Orders
- Consecration: 21 December 1488 by Jean Balue
- Created cardinal: 20 September 1493 by Alexander VI
- Rank: Cardinal-Bishop

Personal details
- Born: 8 September 1456 Plasencia, Extremadura, Castille
- Died: 16 December 1523 (aged 67) Rome, Papal States
- Denomination: Roman Catholic

Bernardino López de Carvajal (8 September 1456, in Plasencia, Extremadura – 16 December 1523, in Rome) was a Spanish Cardinal.

== Life ==
He was a nephew of Cardinal Juan Carvajal. He studied in Salamanca from 1466; obtained a bachelor's degree in 1472; and a licentiate in May 1478. Carvajal became rector in 1481.

He was archdeacon at Toro in the Diocese of Zamora, but went to Rome in 1482 during the pontificate of Pope Sixtus IV, who named him a Chamberlain of honor. Named protonotary apostolic by Pope Innocent VIII, he held successively the Spanish sees of Astorga (1488), Badajoz (1489), and Cartagena, in which latter quality he was sent as nuncio to Spain. Their Catholic Majesties sent him back as Spanish ambassador to Pope Alexander VI.

=== Cardinal ===
King Ferdinand II of Aragon recommended Carvajal's promotion to the cardinalate, which was done by Pope Alexander VI (Borja) at the consistory of September 20, 1493, where he was created cardinal-priest of Sts. Peter and Marcellinus, which title he exchanged in 1495 for that of Santa Croce in Gerusalemme.

In the following years he was sent twice as legate to the German imperial court, also to Naples, and acted as Governor of Campania. In 1503 he was made Bishop of Siguenza in Spain, and Administrator of the diocese of Avellino; from 1507 to 1509 he was in turn Cardinal-Bishop of Albano, Bishop of Frascati, Bishop of Palestrina and Bishop of Sabina.

=== Rebel ===
In spite of this rapid advancement and his numerous benefices he is best remembered as the leading spirit of the schismatical Council of Pisa (1511), which he organized with the aid of four other cardinals (Cardinal Briçonnet, Cardinal Francisco Borja, Cardinal Federico Sanseverino, and Cardinal René de Prie). Dissatisfaction with his treatment by Pope Julius II, and subserviency to the excommunicate Louis XII of France, led Carvajal to this rebellious attitude.

Gaetano Moroni says that he went so far as to accept the office of Antipope Martin VI at Milan whither the Council was soon transferred. Von Reumont says that in Pisa he was known to the urchins of the street as "Papa Bernardino".

It would seem, therefore, that ambition was his chief falling; otherwise he was reputed a good theologian and a friend of art and letters, virtuous, eloquent, and skilful in the business of the curia. Both Carvajal and his colleagues were excommunicated by Julius II, and deposed from their offices, which act of the pope was confirmed by the Fifth Lateran Council (1512). At the seventh session (1513) of this council the Italian cardinals, Carvajal and Sanseverino, separated from their two French colleagues, formally renounced the schism, and were restored by Pope Leo X to their offices.

Carvajal was later made Cardinal-Bishop of Ostia and Dean of the Sacred College, with his uncle's former title of San Marcello, and as such welcomed to Rome Pope Adrian VI, whom he survived, and Pope Clement VII.

Carvajal sponsored a considerable body of works that celebrated the deeds of the Catholic Kings and those of the Great Captain, Gonzalo Fernández de Córdoba. He also commissioned literary translations.

He had lived at Rome under eight popes, and was buried in his titular church of Santa Croce, where a magnificent sepulchral monument perpetuates his memory. The noble but modernized frescoes (Pinturicchio school) in the tribuna of the apse, representing the Discovery of the Holy Cross, are owing to his generosity.

Catholic Church titles
Preceded by García Alvarez de Toledo	Bishop of Astorga; 1488	Succeeded by Juan Ruiz de Medina
Preceded by ?	Bishop of Badajoz; 1489–1493	Succeeded by Juan Ruiz de Medina
Preceded by Rodrigo de Borja	Bishop of Cartagena; 1493–1495	Succeeded by Juan Ruiz de Medina
Preceded by Pedro González de Mendoza	Bishop of Sigüenza; 1495–1519	Succeeded by Fadrique de Portugal Noreña
Preceded by Antonio De Pirro	Bishop of Avellino; 1503	Succeeded by Antonio De Caro
Preceded by Raffaele Sansoni Galeotti Riario	Cardinal-bishop of Albano; 1507	Succeeded by Guillaume Briçonnet
Preceded by Giovanni Antonio Sangiorgio	Cardinal-bishop of Frascati; 1507–1508	Succeeded by Guillaume Briçonnet
Preceded by Giovanni Antonio Sangiorgio	Cardinal-bishop of Palestrina; 1508–1509	Succeeded by Guillaume Briçonnet
Preceded by Giovanni Antonio Sangiorgio	Cardinal-bishop of Sabina; 1509–1511	Succeeded by Francesco Soderini
Preceded by Francesco Soderini	Cardinal-bishop of Sabina; 1513–1521	Succeeded by Niccolò Fieschi
Preceded by Raffaele Riario Sansoni	Cardinal-bishop of Ostia; 1521–1523	Succeeded by Francesco Soderini
Preceded by Raffaele Riario Sansoni	Dean of the College of Cardinals; 1521–1523	Succeeded by Francesco Soderini
