= Cristo de Chircales =

16th-century painting

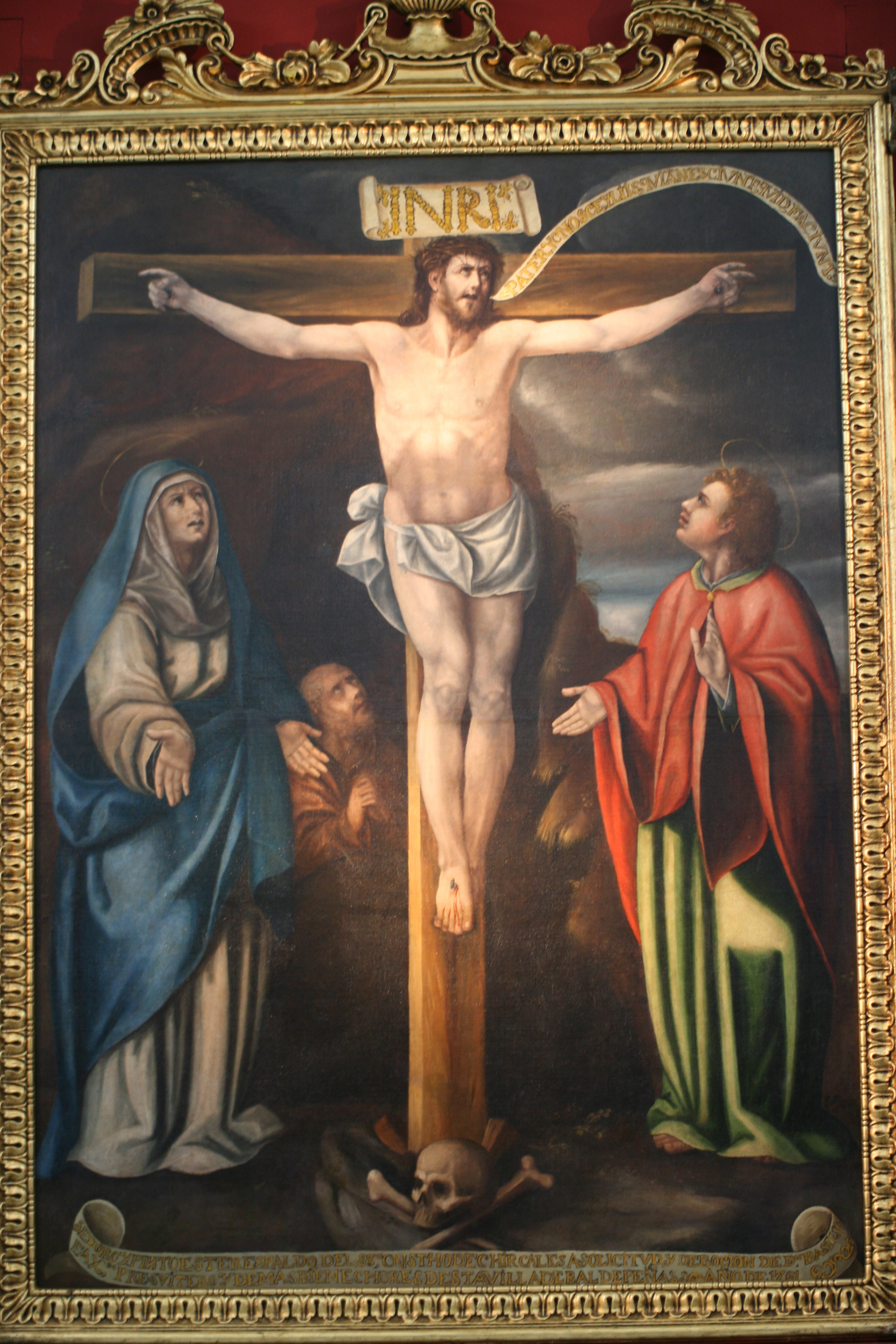
- Artist: unknown
- Year: 16th century
- Type: Oil
- Location: Valdepeñas de Jaén

The Cristo de Chircales, or Santísimo Cristo de Chircales, it is a painting on oil in linen by an anonymous author, preserved in the Sanctum of the Holiest Christ de Chircales, Valdepeñas de Jaén in 16th century.

The work there represents a Calvary, with crucified Christ, Virgin Mary, Saint John Evangelist and a personage knelt down to the feet, which some authors identify as a hermit donor and others as knelt down Apostle San Pedro. The painting presides at the biggest altar of the Church of the Sanctum of Chircales, place to 5 kilometers of Valdepeñas de Jaén, Spain, of that capture names. Sanctum of medieval origin, and in that from the XVIth century it located a hermits' community that survived up to the confiscations during 19th century It is the most important devotion of the region of Valdepeñas de Jaén, and concerning the same one diverse brotherhoods have been constituted. Of them they survive the Brotherhood of the Santísimo Cristo de Chircales in Valdepeñas de Jaén, founded in 1834, and the Brotherhood of Jaén of the Holiest Christ de Chircales, of 1867. His festivity is celebrated on September 2, and is a local holiday of Valdepeñas de Jaén. On the first Sunday of May a popular pilgrimage is celebrated in his honor. The local and regional importance of the pilgrimage, as well as his festive religious and traditional values, they have allowed his recent declaration as Immaterial Patrimony of Andalusia.

== Description ==
The painting depicts the mystery of Calvary, with Jesus Christ crucified, and at his feet three characters. On the left side the Virgin Mary, to the right the Apostle St. John, and at the foot of the cross, a blurred figure in the background that traditional historiography has interpreted as that of hermit, but which recent studies have associated with St. Peter the Apostle, on the scene of sacred history and the iconography of 'the tears of St Peter'. Sustained interpretation in an inventory of 1620 in which the following reference appears: hallo en la iglesia en el altar un/ cuadro grande de un Cristo crucificado/ con Ntra. Señora y San Juan y San Pedro a los pies/ que es la inspiración”.

== History ==
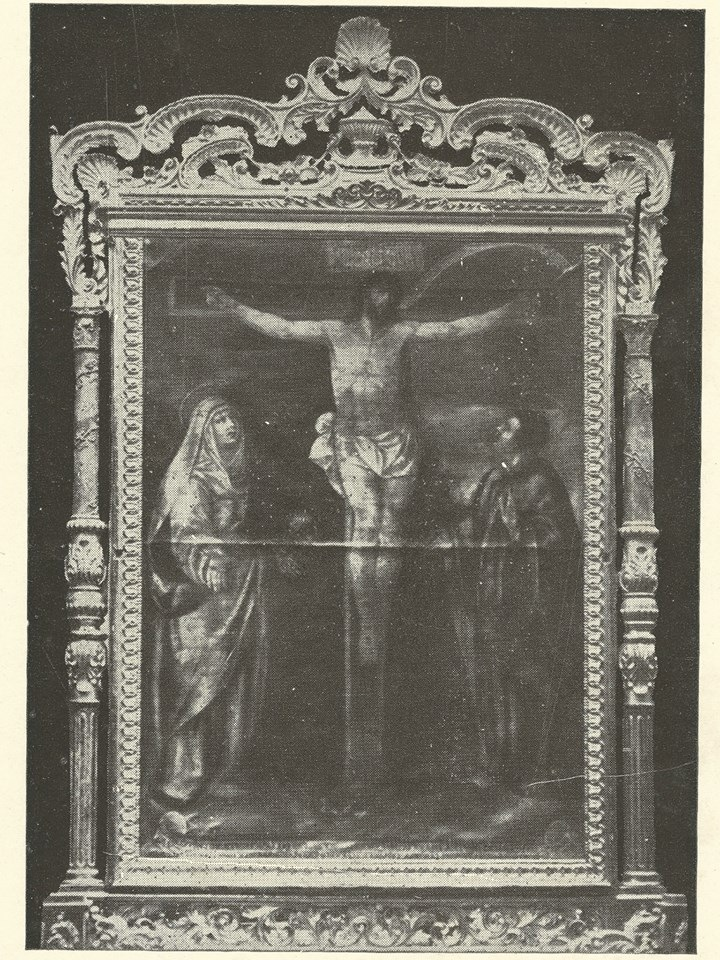
Photo-recorded in the magazine 'Don Lope de Sosa', 1921. (Rafael Peinado)

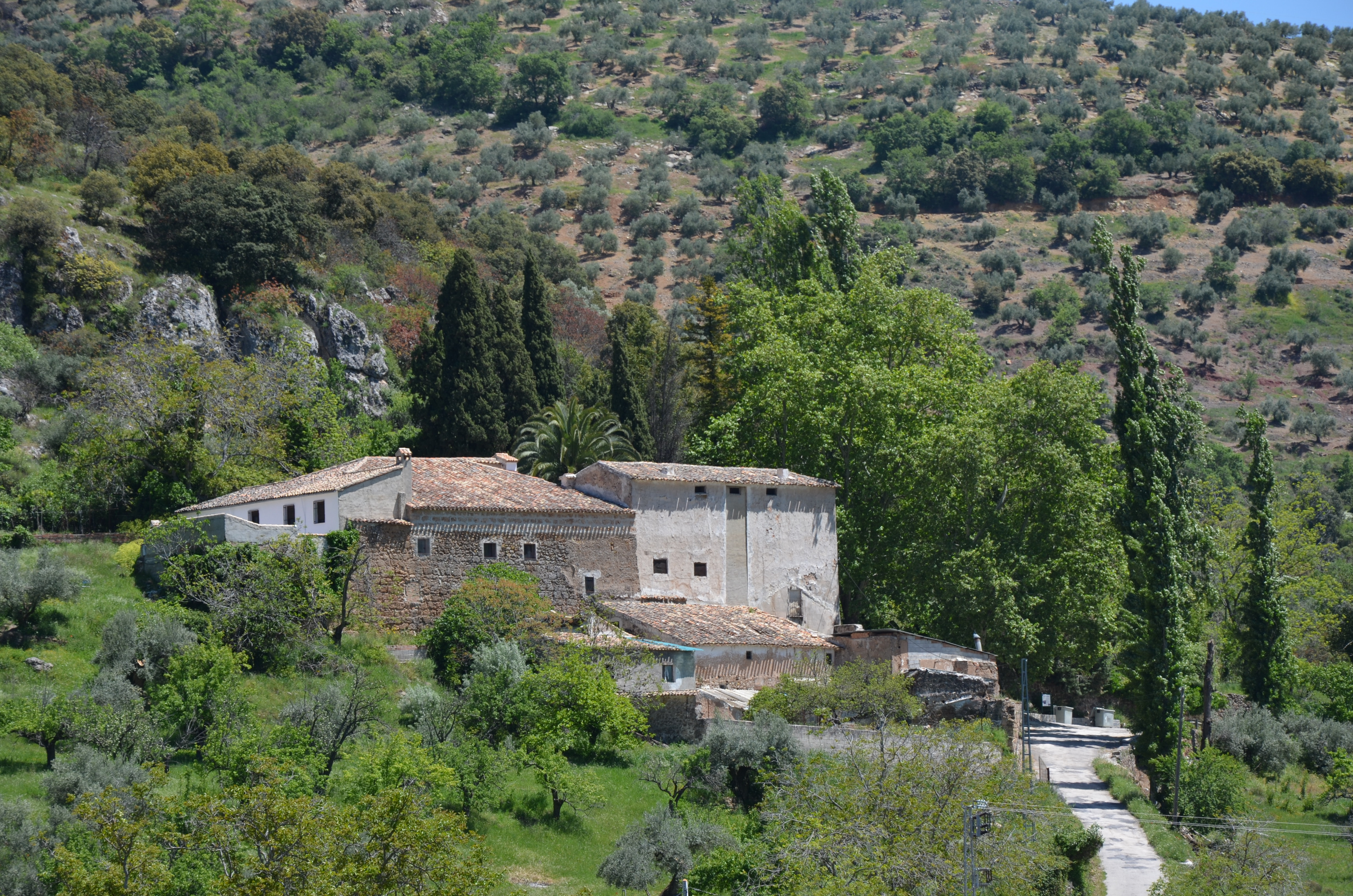
Sanctuary of the Most Holy Christ of Chircales

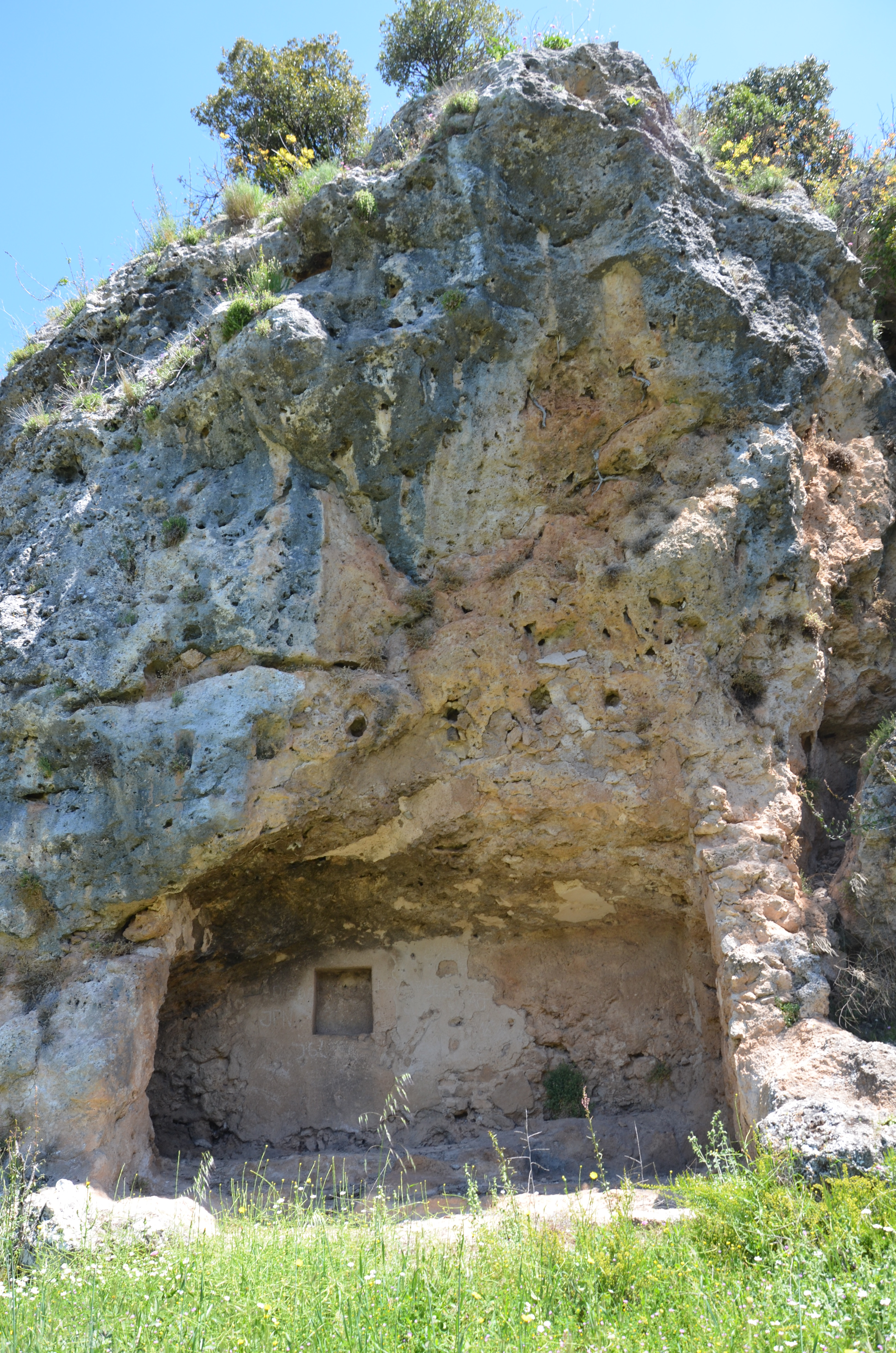
Archaeological remains of the primitive hermitages of Chircales

The history of Valdepeñas de Jaén is deeply linked to the history of the Christ of Chircales. Since the founding in 1539, the contacts with the site of Chircales and the community of hermits who lived there (occupying various caves of the foothills of the valley) was increasing. And from this relationship, various Foundations and Chaplainiah were endowed to sustain Christian worship and devotion in that place. The Sanctuary acquired goods with which to exist. Since the mid-16th century the presence of a group of hermit priests residing in Chircales (Luis de Noguera, Gaspar Lucas and Ginés de Jesús de Naples) and linked to the priestly school of San Juan de Avila incentivized in all areas the material and spiritual construction of the Sanctuary.

For this purpose, the construction of the present Church of the Shrine, and of some outbuildings, was addressed in order to open the hermit to the faithful. To this end, an artistic beautification must also have been sought, which led them to commission the painting of the Christ of Chircales. The Iconography theme had deeply linked to the spirituality of St. John of Avila and his disciples.

The first testimony of the existence of the painting of the Christ of Chircales dates back from 1609, in which his existence appeared in an inventory of goods commanded by Bishop Sancho Dávila Toledo.

In 1751, and with a marked devotional character, the painting was substantially modified, to accommodate two philanthropy in memory of the gold of the Baroque framework, and the elaboration of the painting of an allusive endorsement of the exaltation of the Eucharist. The lower phylactery has inscribed the following text: This endorsement of the Blessed Christ of Chircales was endowed and painted at the request from Mr. Basilio Fajardo, priest and other benefactors of the town of Baldepeñas. Year 1751. And on the top, coming out of the expiring face of Christ: Pater ygnosce illis quia nesciunt quid faciunt (Father, forgive them because they do not know what they do).

== Devotion ==
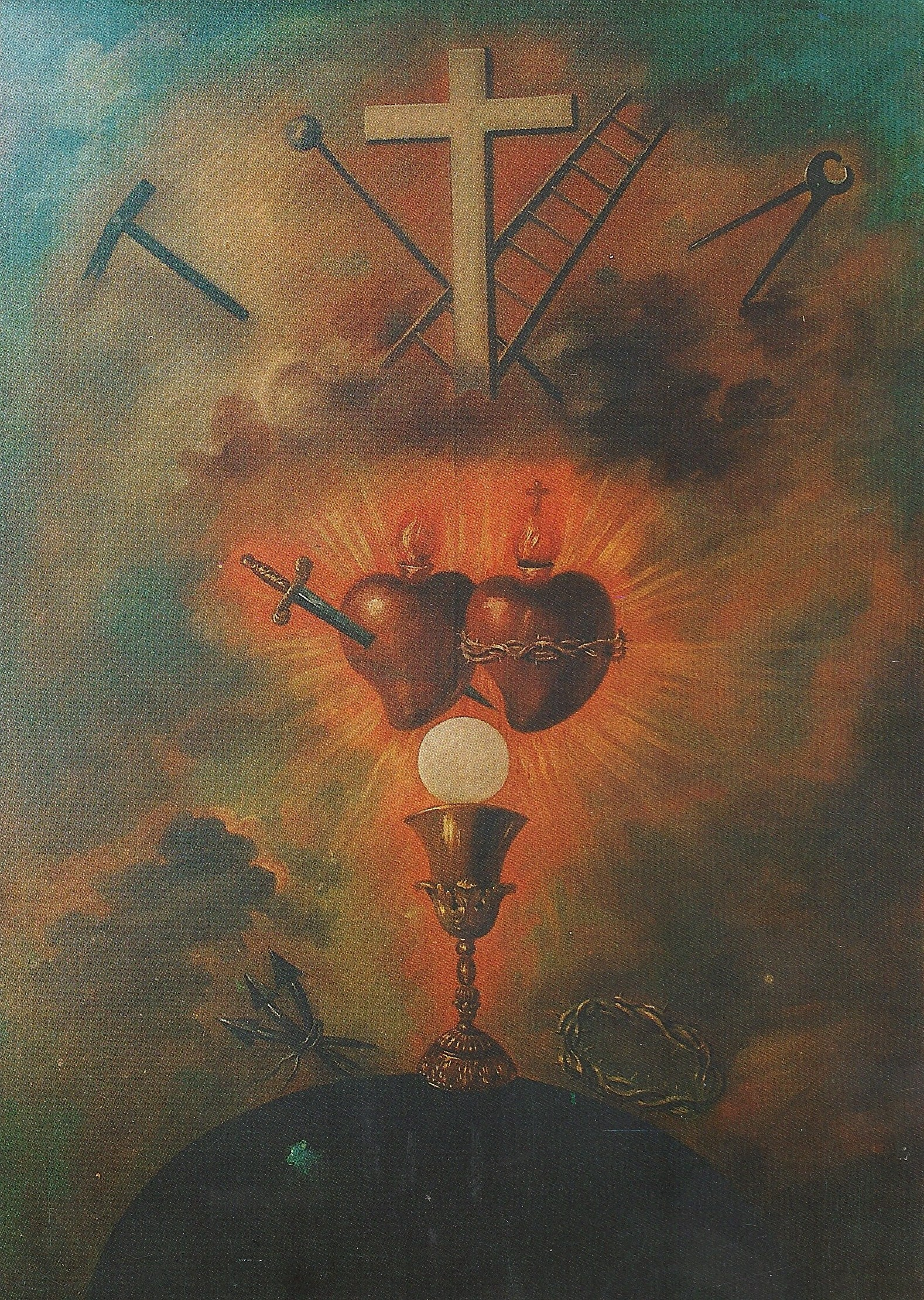
Obscured painting of Alliance of hearts of Jesus and Mary by unknown painter.

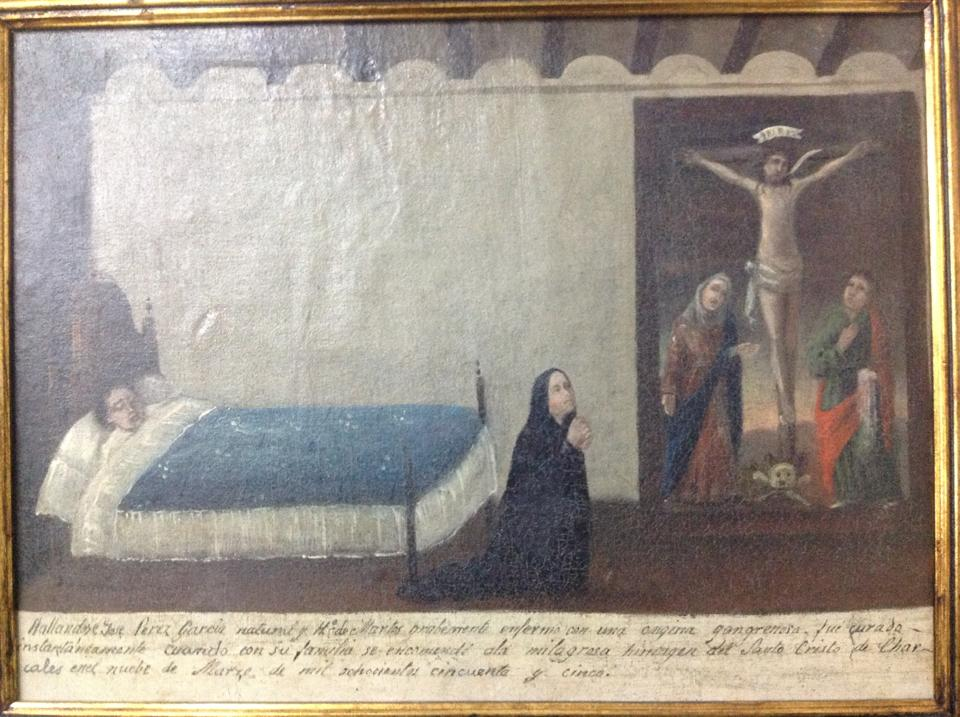
Votive painting by Don José Pérez García, 1855. Museum of the Brotherhood of the Most Holy Christ of Chircales de Valdepeñas de Jaén.

The Christ of Chircales had adored an extended regional and local devotion in Valdepeñas de Jaén, where it is the main one of religious devotions. Since the seventeenth century it has been written of its sporadic transfer to Valdepeñas de Jaén on the occasion of begging for epidemics or climatic causes. Since the nineteenth century, and specifically since the morbid cholera epidemic of 1834, its presence in Valdepeñas de Jaén is more common, and from the end of the century it is annual and traditional, where it remains from the first of September, until the last Sunday of October, when it is transferred to its Sanctuary. There is a historical record of his devotion in all the villages of his region, having existed brotherhoods under his advocation in almost all towns and cities.

In 1834 several neighbors of a populous street of Valdepeñas de Jaén, from la Calle de Sisehace, entrusted their health to the Christ of Chircales during an epidemic of morbid cholera, and having not been killed they agreed to the foundation of a bond, through which they would pay for a religious festival in honor of the Christ of Chircales. Over time, around 1855 devotion materialized in the foundation of a Brotherhood to attend to the local devotion to the Christ of Chircales. Since then the brotherhood has thickened his payroll of brotherhoods and took over the Sanctuary and devotion. Today it survives as the only Canonically erected Brotherhood in the town.

In Jaén devotion to the Christ of Chircales had an important value. There is currently a Brotherhood under his canonical-based advocation in the Parish of San Juan de la Cruz, being a member of the Brotherhood and Brotherhood Group of the City of Jaén. Brotherhood with statutes since 1867 and which was based in the Church of St. Bartholomew (Jaén). The Brotherhood, reorganized in 1985, participates annually in the religious festivities held in Valdepeñas de Jaén, and the ones it celebrates in its canonical headquarters of the capital.

In Martos, the preserved replica is displayed in the Hermitage of San Miguel, a 19th-century copy of the painting of the Christ of Chircales, belonging to the artistic legacy of Don Antonio de la Torre Arias, great devotee of this image. Originally the painting must have been in his palace house, then passed to his funeral pantheon of the municipal cemetery, from where he passed to the Church of San Francisco, and from this, in present time to the Hermitage of San Miguel, belonging to the Parish of the Assumption.

In Alcaudete, José de Torres Ortega, the devotion to the Christ of Chircales had been traditionally dedicated to many devotees currently it still exists in the Caserío 'Chircales', a farmhouse that was owned by it, a chapel dedicated to the Christ of Chircales, where a popular pilgrimage was held. Being also the name of Chircales, a wide location of the municipality of Alcaudete.

In Jamilena there is evidence of devotion to the Christ of Chircales, and of the usual pilgrimage to his Sanctuary. In 1798 he died in an accident, after a wall had been tached from the hospedería, the neighbor of Jamilena Cristóbal Barranco Liébana, who was buried in the Church of the Sanctuary.

In Torredonjimeno it is also common to find references to the historical devotion of the Christ of Chircales. And from this devotion are located some votive pictorial works that were given away by the faithful to the Sanctuary. The former president of Torredonjimeno has the following inscription: Estando Francisca de Rada gravemente enferma, con un tabardillo, su madre María de los Dolores Lendínez, miró al Santísimo Cristo de Chircales, pidiendo su salud y estando en esta súplica consiguió su perfecta salud. Esta enferma es vecina de Torredonjimeno. Año 1856.

== Bibliography ==
- Martínez Cabrera, Félix (2000). Chircales y su Cristo. Valdepeñas de Jaén: Cofradía del Santísimo Cristo de Chircales de Valdepeñas de Jaén. ISBN 84-95233-13-4.
- Infante Martínez, Juan (1995). Cofradía del Santísimo Cristo de Chircales de Valdepeñas de Jaén: historia, estatutos y reglamento de régimen interno. Valdepeñas de Jaén: Cofradía del Santísimo Cristo de Chircales de Valdepeñas de Jaén. J 262-1995 Oficina Depósito Legal Jaén.
- Infante Martínez, Juan (2000). Pregones de la Romería del Santísimo Cristo de Chircales, Valdepeñas de Jaén, 1990-1999. Valdepeñas de Jaén: Cofradía del Santísimo Cristo de Chircales de Valdepeñas de Jaén. J 229-2000 Oficina Depósito Legal Jaén.
