= Juan Daza =

Spanish Catholic bishop (died 1510)

Most Reverend Juan Daza
- Bishop of Córdoba
- Church: Catholic Church
- Diocese: Diocese of Córdoba
- In office: 1504–1510
- Predecessor: Juan Rodríguez de Fonseca
- Successor: Martín Fernández de Angulo Saavedra y Luna
- Previous posts: Bishop of Catania (1496–1498); Bishop of Oviedo (1498–1502); Bishop of Cartagena (1502–1504)

Personal details
- Died: 21 May 1510 Córdoba, Andalusia, Spain

Juan Daza (died 1510) was a Roman Catholic prelate who served as Bishop of Córdoba (1504–1510), Bishop of Cartagena (1502–1504), Bishop of Oviedo (1498–1502), and Bishop of Catania (1496–1498).

== Biography ==
On 27 June 1496, Juan Daza was appointed during the papacy of Pope Alexander VI as Bishop of Catania. On 14 February 1498, he was appointed during the papacy of Pope Alexander VI as Bishop of Oviedo. On 16 March 1502, he was appointed during the papacy of Pope Alexander VI as Bishop of Cartagena. On 4 November 1504, he was appointed during the papacy of Pope Julius II as Bishop of Córdoba. He served as Bishop of Córdoba until his death on 21 May 1510.

== External links and additional sources ==
- Cheney, David M. "Archdiocese of Catania". Catholic-Hierarchy.org. (for Chronology of Bishops) ^{[self-published]}
- Chow, Gabriel. "Metropolitan Archdiocese of Catania". GCatholic.org. (for Chronology of Bishops) ^{[self-published]}
- Cheney, David M. "Metropolitan Archdiocese of Oviedo". Catholic-Hierarchy.org. (for Chronology of Bishops)^{self-published}
- Chow, Gabriel. "Archdiocese of Oviedo (Spain)". GCatholic.org. (for Chronology of Bishops)^{self-published}
- Cheney, David M. "Diocese of Cartagena". Catholic-Hierarchy.org. (for Chronology of Bishops) ^{[self-published]}
- Chow, Gabriel. "Diocese of Cartagena". GCatholic.org. (for Chronology of Bishops) ^{[self-published]}
- Cheney, David M. "Diocese of Córdoba". Catholic-Hierarchy.org. (for Chronology of Bishops) ^{[self-published]}
- Chow, Gabriel. "Diocese of Córdoba". GCatholic.org. (for Chronology of Bishops) ^{[self-published]}

Catholic Church titles
Preceded by Alfonso Carrillo de Albornoz (bishop)	Bishop of Catania; 1496–1498	Succeeded by Francisco Desprats
Preceded by Juan Arias de Villar	Bishop of Oviedo; 1498–1502	Succeeded by García Ramírez Villaescusa
Preceded by Juan Ruiz de Medina	Bishop of Cartagena; 1502–1504	Succeeded by Juan Fernández Velasco
Preceded by Juan Rodríguez de Fonseca	Bishop of Córdoba; 1504–1510	Succeeded by Martín Fernández de Angulo Saavedra y Luna
