= Count of Elda =

Hereditary title in the Peerage of Spain

Countship of Elda
- Creation date: 14 May 1577
- Created by: Philip II
- Peerage: Peerage of Spain
- First holder: Juan Coloma y Cardona, 1st Count of Elda
- Present holder: Enrique Falcó y Carrión, 15th Count of Elda

Count of Elda (Spanish: Conde de Elda) is a hereditary title in the Peerage of Spain accompanied by the dignity of Grandee, granted in 1577 by Philip II to Juan Coloma, who was Viceroy of Sardinia.

The name makes reference to the town of Elda in Alicante.

== Counts of Elda (1577) ==
- Juan Coloma y Cardona, 1st Count of Elda (1522-1586)
- Antonio Coloma y de Saá, 2nd Count of Elda (1555-1619), son of the 1st Count
- Juan Coloma y Mendoza, 3rd Count of Elda (1591-1638), son of the 2nd Count
- Juan Andrés Coloma, 4th Count of Elda (1621-1694), son of the 3rd Count
- Francisco Coloma y Pujadas, 5th Count of Elda (1656-1712), son of the 4th Count
- Francisco Coloma y de la Cerda, 6th Count of Elda (1698-1729), son of the 5th Count
- Gonzalo Arias Dávila y Coloma, 7th Count of Elda (1666-1738), grandson of the 4th Count
- Diego Arias Dávila, 8th Count of Elda (d. 1751), son of the 7th Count
- Francisco Arias Dávila, 9th Count of Elda (d. 1783), son of the 8th Count
- Laura Castellví de Alagón y Coloma, 10th Countess of Elda (d. 1799), great-granddaughter of the 6th Count
- Felipe Carlos Osorio y Castellví, 11th Count of Elda (1758-1815), son of the 10th Countess
- Felipe Osorio y de la Cueva, 12th Count of Elda (1795-1859), son of the 11th Count
- María del Pilar Osorio y Gutiérrez de los Ríos, 13th Countess of Elda (1829-1921), daughter of the 12th Count
- José Falcó y Álvarez de Toledo, 14th Count of Elda (1898-1983), grandson of the 13th Countess
- Enrique Falcó y Carrión, 15th Count of Elda (b. 1933), son of the 14th Count

== See also ==
- List of current grandees of Spain

== Bibliography ==
- Hidalgos de España, Real Asociación de (2018). Elenco de Grandezas y Títulos Nobiliarios Españoles. Ediciones Hidalguía. ISBN 978-84-94841-02-6.
