= Francisco de Manso Zuñiga y Sola =

Most Reverend Francisco de Manso Zuñiga y Sola
- Archbishop of Burgos
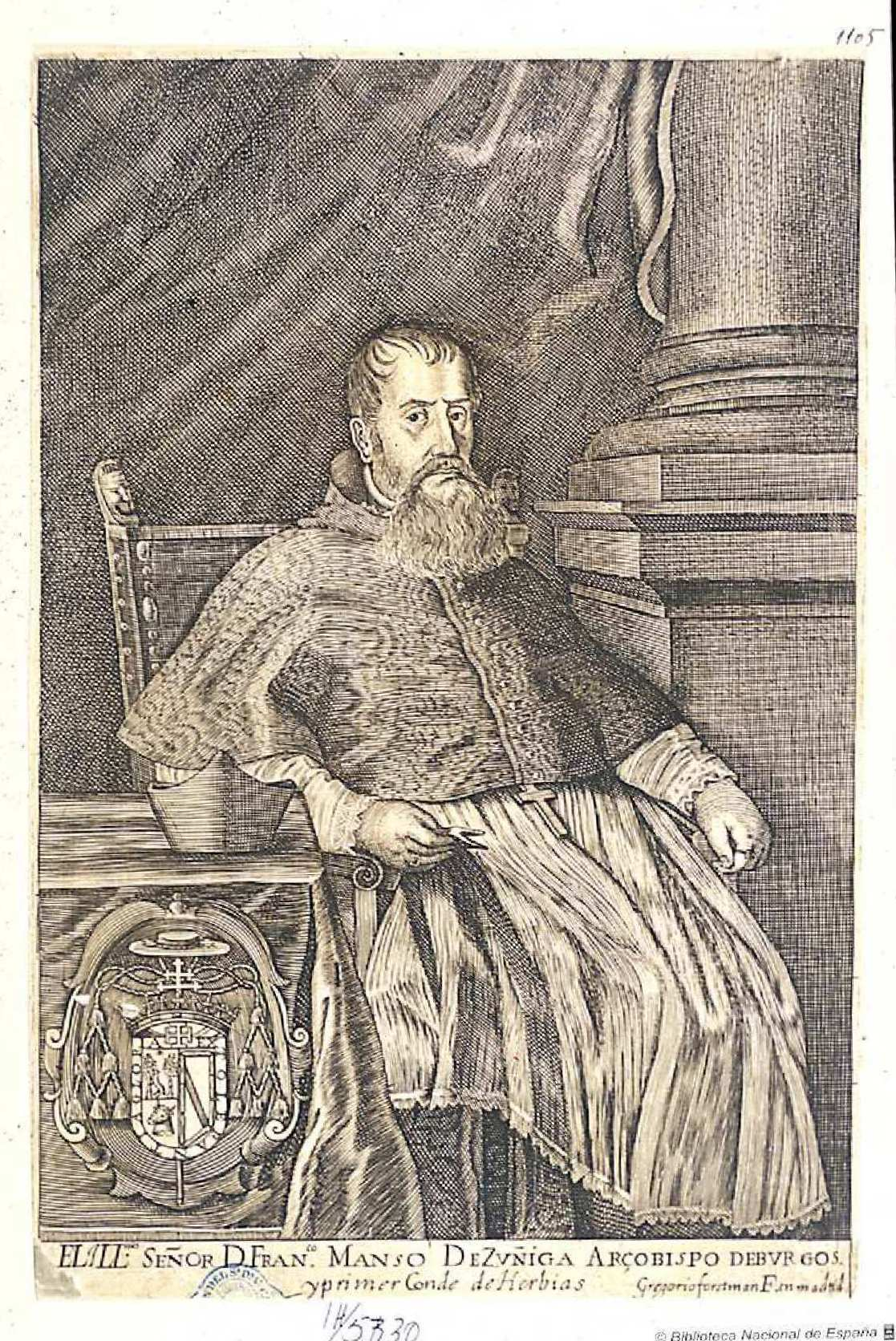
- Church: Catholic Church
- Archdiocese: Archdiocese of Burgos
- In office: 1640–1655
- Predecessor: Fernando Andrade Sotomayor
- Successor: Juan Pérez Delgado
- Previous posts: Archbishop of Mexico (1627–1634); Archbishop (Personal Title) of Cartagena (1637–1640)

Orders
- Consecration: April 12, 1628 by Alonso Orozco Enriquez de Armendáriz Castellanos y Toledo

Personal details
- Born: 1587 Cañas, La Rioja, Spain
- Died: December 27, 1655 (age 68) Burgos, Spain

Francisco de Manso Zuñiga y Sola (1587 – December 27, 1655) was a Spanish Catholic prelate who served as Archbishop of Burgos (1640–1655), Archbishop (Personal Title) of Cartagena (1637–1640), and as Archbishop of Mexico (1627–1634).

== Biography ==
Francisco de Manso Zuñiga y Sola was born in Cañas, La Rioja, Spain. On August 9, 1627, he was selected by the King of Spain and confirmed by Pope Urban VIII as Archbishop of Mexico. April 12, 1628, he was consecrated bishop by Alonso Orozco Enriquez de Armendáriz Castellanos y Toledo, Bishop of Michoacán. He served as Archbishop of Mexico until his resignation on July 20, 1634. On October 5, 1637, he was selected by the King of Spain and confirmed by Pope Urban VIII as Archbishop (Personal Title) of Cartagena. On October 8, 1640, he was selected by the King of Spain and confirmed by Pope Urban VIII as Archbishop of Burgos where he served until his death on December 27, 1655.

While bishop, he was the principal consecrator of Juan Velasco Acevedo, Bishop of Orense (1637); Pedro Luis Manso Zuñiga, Auxiliary Bishop of Burgos (1648); and Juan Bravo Lasprilla, Bishop of Lugo (1652).

== External links and additional sources ==
- Cheney, David M. "Archdiocese of México". Catholic-Hierarchy.org. (for Chronology of Bishops)^{self-published}
- Chow, Gabriel. "Metropolitan Archdiocese of México". GCatholic.org. (for Chronology of Bishops)^{self-published}
- Cheney, David M. "Diocese of Cartagena". Catholic-Hierarchy.org. (for Chronology of Bishops) ^{[self-published]}
- Chow, Gabriel. "Diocese of Cartagena". GCatholic.org. (for Chronology of Bishops) ^{[self-published]}
- Cheney, David M. "Archdiocese of Burgos". Catholic-Hierarchy.org. (for Chronology of Bishops) ^{[self-published]}
- Chow, Gabriel. "Metropolitan Archdiocese of Burgos (Spain)". GCatholic.org. (for Chronology of Bishops) ^{[self-published]}

Catholic Church titles
Preceded by Juan Pérez de la Serna	Archbishop of Mexico; 1627–1634	Succeeded by Francisco Verdugo Cabrera
Preceded by Antonio Trejo de Sande Paniagua	Archbishop (Personal Title) of Cartagena; 1637–1640	Succeeded by Mendo de Benavides
Preceded by Fernando Andrade Sotomayor	Archbishop of Burgos; 1640–1655	Succeeded by Juan Pérez Delgado
