= Pedro Luis Manso Zuñiga =

Spanish Roman Catholic prelate

Most Reverend Juan González Meneses
- Auxiliary Bishop of Burgos
- Church: Catholic Church
- Archdiocese: Archdiocese of Burgos
- Installed: 1648
- Term ended: 16 December 1669

Personal details
- Died: 16 December 1669 Burgos, Spain

Pedro Luis Manso Zuñiga (died 16 December 1669) was a Roman Catholic prelate who served as Auxiliary Bishop of Burgos (1648–1669).

== Biography ==
On 6 Jul 1648, Pedro Luis Manso Zuñiga was selected by the King of Spain and confirmed by Pope Innocent X as Auxiliary Bishop of Burgos and Titular Bishop of Auzia. On 22 Nov 1648, he was consecrated bishop by Francisco de Manso Zuñiga y Sola, Bishop of Burgos. He served as Auxiliary Bishop of Burgos until his death on 16 Dec 1669. While bishop, he was the principal co-consecrator of Pedro Carrillo Acuña y Bureba, Bishop of Salamanca, and Juan Bravo Lasprilla, Bishop of Lugo.
