= Auzia =

Roman-Berber colonia in Algeria

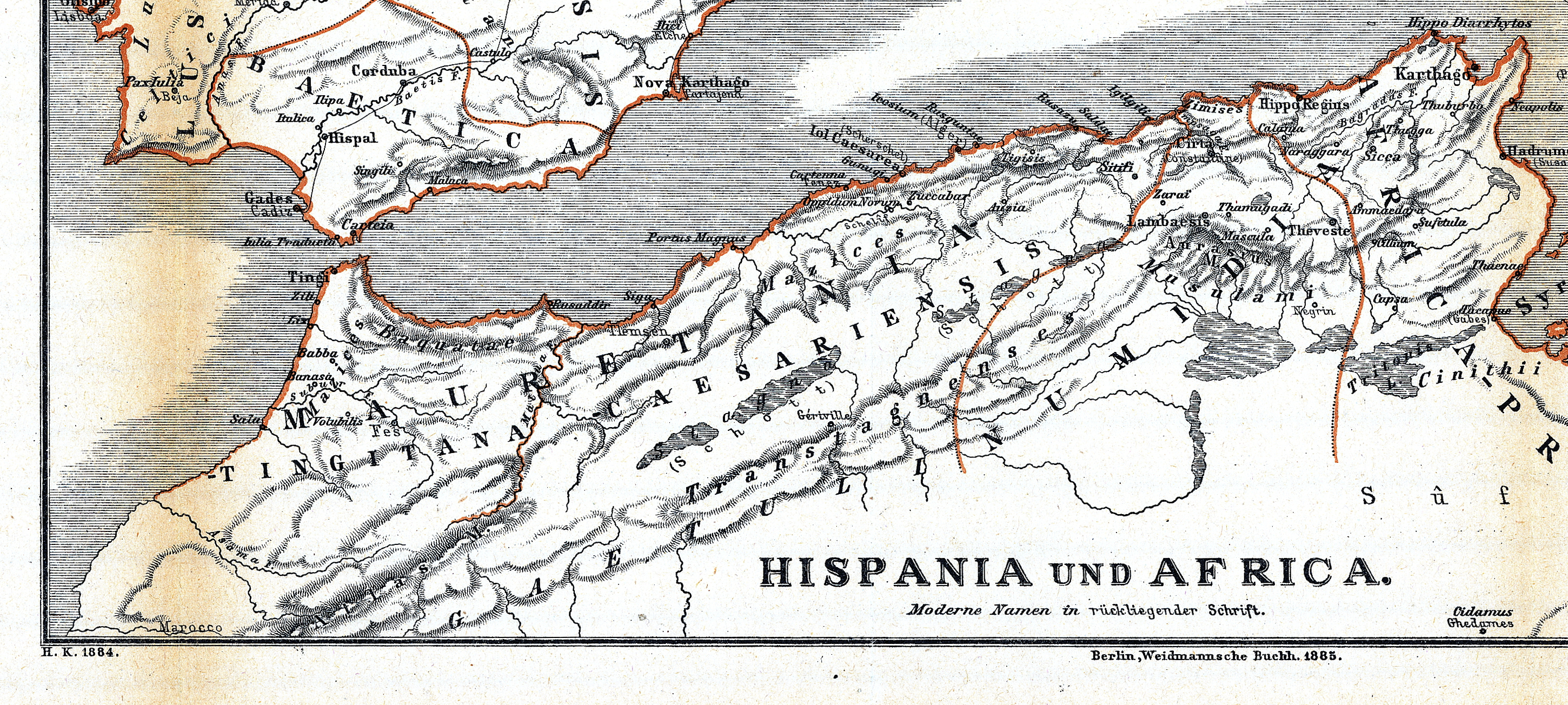
- Map showing Auzia just south of Algiers (Roman Icosium)

- Location within Algeria
- 36.147222°N 3.690556°E
- Location: Algeria
- Region: Bouïra Province

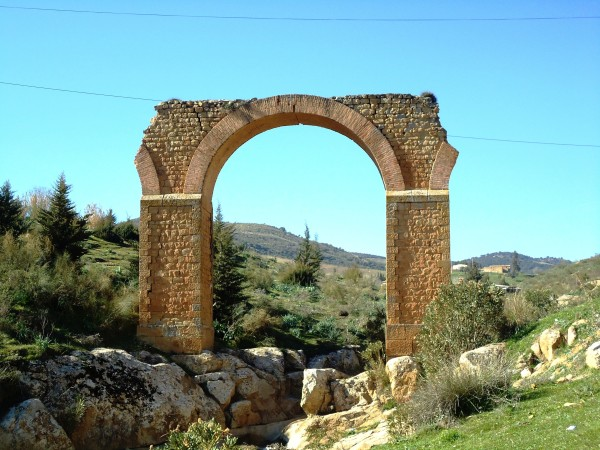
Remnants of Roman Aquaeduct at Auzia

Auzia was a Roman-Berber colonia in present-day Sour El-Ghozlane, Algeria. The area was located around 150 km south-east of Algiers, in the ancient province of Mauretania Caesariensis.

== History ==
Auzia probably took the name from the Berber pagan god "Auzius", because under Augustus a Roman castrum was founded near a small Berber village with that name The city constituted of a castrum (fort) and a vicus (small city): Auzia achieved autonomous status as municipium in the second century and later was renamed Colonia Septima Aurelia Auziense by emperor Septimius Severus. As a Roman colonia, its people received full status of Roman citizenship rights.

Tacitus wrote about a "Castellum Auziense", as the headquarters of the Roman garrison commander in Mauretania Caesariensis's central limes (border fortifications).

According to the historian Richard Lawless, Auzia was a vicus that achieved independent status from the castrum (fort) garrison and had a forum (market square) and an important pagan temple, later converted into a Christian church. The Roman settlement (probably with nearly 4,000 inhabitants around 200 AD) was surrounded by farms.

Auzia had even a theatre and a small "circus" for chariot races, created around 227 AD according to epigraphic evidence

Auzia achieved prosperity mainly because it was at the centre of some roads in Roman Africa: from Auzia there were roads toward the Mediterranean sea (Caesarea) and the Saharan interior with the Atlas mountains.

In 290 AD, however, the Bavares tribe attacked Auzia and the city suffered huge destruction. Vandals and Byzantine troops occupied temporarily the city.

It was reduced to a small village when Arabs conquered the region at the end of the seventh century.

== Archaeology ==
According to the sources, the French had undertaken several excavations in the ruins of Auzia without ever revealing the slightest historical fact to scientific research because of the policy of francization which was aimed at erasing all trace of civilization old or present on the territory Algerian.

In addition, the reconstruction of Auzia would have destroyed several historical sites in the time of the Duke of Aumale. All the large-scale excavations were carried out secretly by the French authorities, who forbade access to the sites to the Arabs, which means that they wanted to hide all the increasingly numerous A civilization fundamentally different from that of the Roman Empire. The French administrative decision prompts the workers with a confidential note to destroy all objects and funeral inscriptions found in the site of the temple of Apollo, completely destroyed to build the civil hospital there - a truth conveyed through history by Algerians who participated in the construction of the city of Aumale. At the same time, Auzia was not occupied by inhabitants, it was about Roman ruins that the French choose for the construction of the city of Aumale. The inhabitants of the region, mostly from the tribes of Ouled Driss, Ouled Faârha and Ouled Khalouf who occupied the Dirah Mountains, organized themselves and succeeded in uniting all the tribes to oppose the French troops and then to be forced into negotiations.

== Urban design ==
The study of the urbanism of the ruins reveals that the town of Auzia was fenced by a long wall of quarry stone, supposedly removed from the quarry located as the departmental road connecting Sour-El-Ghozlane - Ain-Bessem. A wall 75 cm wide and 6.7 km long surrounding the city. The total area of Auzia is 920 hectares. Inside, the Romans built a large military barracks at the entrance of Bab-El-Gurt (currently). There were several cohorts, commanded by a tribune militum, a squadron of Moorish vexillaries (light and mobile troops recruited from the provinces), supported in force by a cavalry corps (led by three decurions and a Præfectus equitum. Which was important for the Roman Empire and had a regional military district in charge of surveillance and intervention at the scale of the Tirinadi (Berrouaghia) region in the Djurdjura and Biban Mountains. (Djouab), the second in Afoul (Chalalat el-Adhoura) and the third in the mountains of Jebel Lakhdar in Achir (The ruins located 4 km from Ain-Boucif reveal the existence of this bastion advanced).

== Population ==
The total area of Roman construction in the city of Auzia, a space of more than 720 hectares, reveals that the city was populated by a population of more than 12 000 to 13 000 inhabitants, that it would be the largest Roman city of Central Algeria, more important than Tipaza. But this figure could be increased in view of its status as a large military barracks. In addition, the shape of the city reveals a common principle of construction rules, based on the keys of modern urbanism namely the four functions: habitat, work, leisure and circulation. This quality of modern city that can be made of Auzia, attracted the inhabitants of all the tribes, which had resulted in a galloping demography which prompted the Roman authorities to found another city in the region, first to defend Auzia Repeated attacks by the Moors in a protected place, like a fortified enclosure. This was the origin of the foundation of CASTELLUM AUZIENS.

== Former and Titular bishopric ==
Christianity was present in the Auzia area during the third century. It achieved the status of episcopal see. It was one of the many suffragans of the metropolitan Archbishopric of Mauretania Caesariensis, the capital of the Late Roman province of Mauretania Caesariensis, and faded like most.

The ancient diocese of Auzia was nominally revived in 1594 as a Latin Catholic titular bishopric of the lowest (episcopal) rank. It had many incumbents - all episcopal - until its suppression in 1913.

- Jean Daffis (1594.01.19 – 1597.11.10)
- Jean de Bertier (1602.02.25 – 1602.08.31)
- Antoine de Coues (1604.03.15 – 1616)
- Bishop-elect Alphonse d’Elbène (1608.02.04 – 1608.02.08)
- Henri Clausse de Fleury (1608.04.28 – 1624.09.18)
- Philibert du Sault (1618.07.23 – 1623.05.25)
- Pedro Luis Manso Zuñiga (1648.07.06 – 1669.12.16)
- Jacques de Bourges, Paris Foreign Missions Society M.E.P. (1679.11.25 – 1714.08.09)
- Lorenzo Taranco Mujaurrieta (1736.02.27 – 1745.03.08)
- Peter Creagh (1745.04.12 – 1747)
- Vincenzo Sangermano, Barnabites (B.) (1792.02.14 – ?)
- John MacLaughlin (1837.02.21 – 1840.08.18)
- Vincenzo Bufi Bocci (1838.02.15 – 1850.07.21)
- Giovanni Battista Arnaldi (1852.03.18 – 1853.03.07) (later Archbishop
- Vitale Galli (1875.07.05 – 1876.01.11)
- Antonio Piterà (1877.03.20 – 1913.05.10)

It was restored in 1933, and since was nearly continuously filled, again all incumbents of episcopal rank:

- Francis Hong Yong-ho (홍용호 프란치스코) (1944.03.24 – 1962.03.10)
- Francisco Xavier Gillmore Stock (1962.09.04 – 1990.05.27)
- Markijan Trofimiak (1991.01.16 – 1998.03.25)
- Ludwig Schick (1998.05.20 – 2002.06.28) (later Archbishop)
- Dominique Marie Jean Denis You ((2002.12.11 – 2006.02.08)
- Yaroslav Pryriz, Redemptorists (C.SS.R.) (2006.03.02 – 2010.04.21)
- F. Richard Spencer (2010.05.22 – ...), Auxiliary Bishop of the Military Ordinariate of United States of America (USA).

== See also ==
- Antonine Itinerary
- Mauretania Caesariensis
- Rusadir
- Altava
- Albulae
- Rapidum
- Pomaria
- Volubilis

== Bibliography ==
- Lawless, R. Mauretania Caesartiensis: anarcheological and geographical survey. Durham University. Durham, 1969 Auzia
- Smith Reid, James. The Municipalities of the Roman Empire The University of Michigan Press. Chicago, 1913.

== Sources and external links ==
- GCatholic - See of Auzia, with titular incumbent bio links
