= Alfonso Coloma =

Spanish prelate and bishop

Alfonso Coloma y Jasarte de Melo (1555 – 20 April 1606) was a Spanish prelate and bishop, member of the House of Coloma.

== Family ==
He is a son of don Juan IV Coloma y Cardona, 1st Count of Elda and a brother of Carlos Coloma. Like others in his family, be was knight of St. John of Jerusalem.

== Career ==
His career started in Sevilla, where he was canon magistral. He was member of the holy Office of the inquisition, and became a royal counselor. On 27 Sep 1599 he was appointed as bishop of Barcelona and ordained by Saint Juan de Ribera. In 1603 he became bishop of Cartagena until his death.

== External links and additional sources ==
- Cheney, David M. "Diocese of Cartagena". Catholic-Hierarchy.org. (for Chronology of Bishops) ^{[self-published]}
- Chow, Gabriel. "Diocese of Cartagena". GCatholic.org. (for Chronology of Bishops) ^{[self-published]}

Catholic Church titles
Preceded by Juan Dimas Lloris	Bishop of Barcelona; 1599–1603	Succeeded by Rafael Rovirola
Preceded by Juan de Zúñiga Flores	Bishop of Cartagena; 1603–1606	Succeeded by Francisco Martínez de Cenicero
