= Mendo de Benavides =

Spanish Roman Catholic prelate

Most Reverend Mendo de Benavides
- Bishop of Cartagena
- Church: Catholic Church
- Diocese: Diocese of Cartagena
- In office: 1640–1644
- Predecessor: Francisco de Manso Zuñiga y Sola
- Successor: Juan Vélez de Valdivielso
- Previous post: Bishop of Segovia (1533–1540)

Orders
- Consecration: 1 January 1634 by Juan Arauz Díaz

Personal details
- Born: 1569 Santisteban del Puerto, Spain
- Died: 17 October 1644 (age 75) Cartagena, Spain

Mendo de Benavides (1569 – 17 October 1644) was a Roman Catholic prelate who served as Bishop of Cartagena (1640–1644) and Bishop of Segovia (1533–1540).

== Biography ==
Mendo de Benavides born in Santisteban del Puerto, Spain. On 18 July 1633, he was selected by the King of Spain and confirmed by Pope Urban VIII as Bishop of Segovia. On 1 January 1634, he was consecrated bishop by Juan Arauz Díaz, Bishop of Guadix with Luis Camargo Pacheco, Auxiliary Bishop of Sevilla, and Marcos Ramírez de Prado y Ovando, Bishop of Chiapas, serving as co-consecrators. On 19 November 1640, he was selected by the King of Spain and confirmed by Pope Urban VIII as Bishop of Cartagena. He served as Bishop of Cartagena until his death on 17 October 1644.

== See also ==
- Catholic Church in Spain

== External links and additional sources ==
- Cheney, David M. "Diocese of Segovia". Catholic-Hierarchy.org. (for Chronology of Bishops) ^{[self-published]}
- Chow, Gabriel. "Diocese of Segovia (Spain)". GCatholic.org. (for Chronology of Bishops) ^{[self-published]}
- Cheney, David M. "Diocese of Cartagena". Catholic-Hierarchy.org. (for Chronology of Bishops) ^{[self-published]}
- Chow, Gabriel. "Diocese of Cartagena". GCatholic.org. (for Chronology of Bishops) ^{[self-published]}

Catholic Church titles
Preceded by Melchor Moscoso San	Bishop of Segovia; 1533–1540	Succeeded by Pedro Tapia
Preceded by Francisco de Manso Zuñiga y Sola	Bishop of Cartagena; 1640–1644	Succeeded by Juan Vélez de Valdivielso
