= Juan de Zúñiga Flores =

Spanish bishop and Grand Inquisitor of Spain

Juan de Zúñiga Flores (died 20 December 1602) was Bishop of Cartagena from 24 January 1600 until his death, and Grand Inquisitor of Spain from 29 July 1602 until his death.

== External links and additional sources ==
- Cheney, David M. "Diocese of Cartagena". Catholic-Hierarchy.org. (for Chronology of Bishops) ^{[self-published]}
- Chow, Gabriel. "Diocese of Cartagena". GCatholic.org. (for Chronology of Bishops) ^{[self-published]}

Catholic Church titles
Preceded by Sancho Dávila y Toledo	Bishop of Cartagena; 1600-1602	Succeeded by Alfonso Coloma Sa
Preceded by Fernando Niño de Guevara	Grand Inquisitor of Spain; 1602	Succeeded by Juan Bautista de Acevedo
