= Juan de Ribera =

Roman Catholic archbishop (1532–1611)

Saint Juan de Ribera
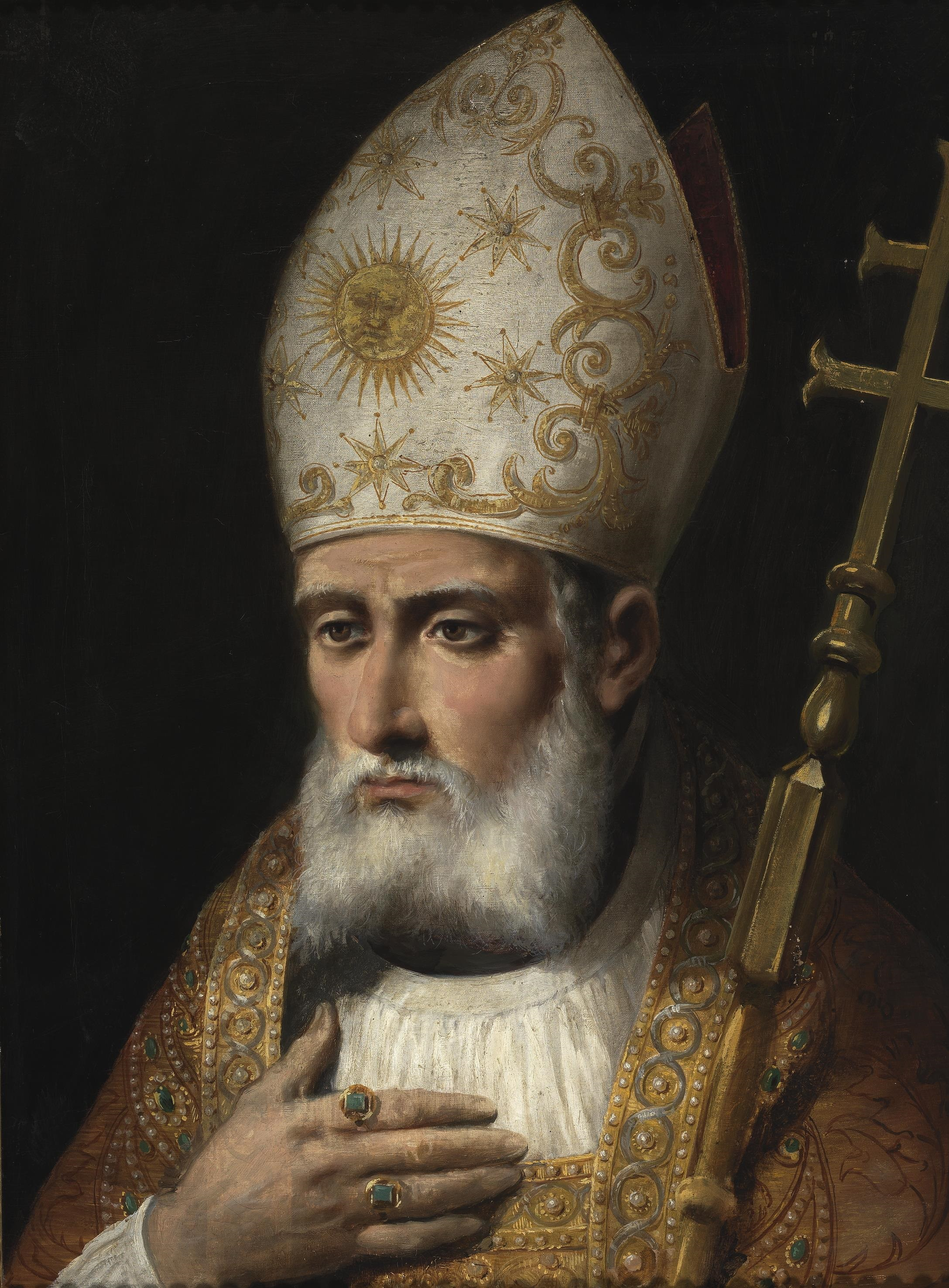
- Saint Juan de Ribera.

Archbishop
- Born: 20 March 1532; Seville, Spain
- Died: 6 January 1611 (aged 78); Valencia, Spain
- Venerated in: Roman Catholic Church
- Beatified: 18 September 1796, Saint Peter's Basilica, Rome, Papal States by Pope Pius VI
- Canonized: 12 June 1960, Saint Peter's Basilica, Vatican City by Pope John XXIII
- Major shrine: Royal College of Corpus Christi, Valencia, Spain
- Feast: 6 January
- Attributes: Episcopal attire

Juan de Ribera (Seville, Spain, 20 March 1532 – Valencia, 6 January 1611) was an influential figure during the reign of Philip III of Spain. He urged harsh measures against so-called New Christians, resulting in the expulsion of the Moriscos in 1609. Ribera held appointments as Archbishop and Viceroy of Valencia, Latin Patriarchate of Antioch, Commander in Chief, president of the Audiencia, and Chancellor of the University of Valencia. He was beatified in 1796 and canonized by Pope John XXIII in 1960.

== Biography ==
Juan de Ribera's father was Pedro Afán de Ribera, Viceroy of Naples and Duke of Alcala. His mother died when he was very young.

Ribera studied at the University of Salamanca. Ordained as priest in 1557, Pope Pius IV appointed him Bishop of Badajoz on 27 May 1562 at the age of 30. There he dedicated himself to teaching the catechism to Roman Catholics and counteracting Protestantism. He was appointed as the Archbishop of Valencia on 3 December 1568. In 1599 he ordained Alfonso Coloma as Bishop of Barcelona. King Philip III of Spain later appointed him Viceroy of Valencia in 1602, and thus he became both the religious and the civil authority. In this role he founded the Museum of the Patriarch, known among Valencians as the College of Saint John, entrusted to the formation of priests according to the spirit and the dispositions of the Council of Trent.

=== Expulsion of the Moriscos ===
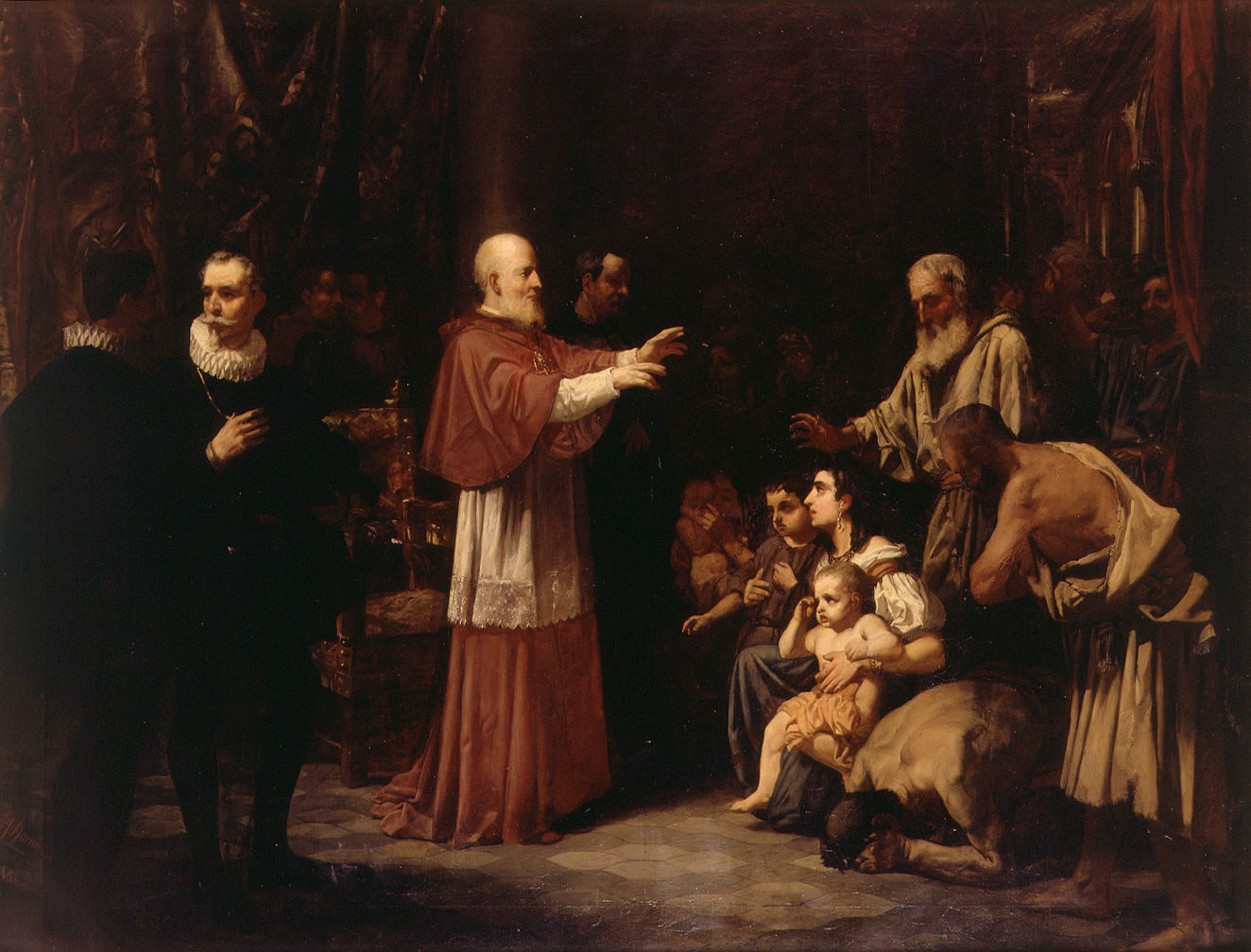
Juan de Ribera in the expulsion of the Moriscos by Francisco Domingo Marqués.

As archbishop, Ribera dealt with the issue of Valencia's large Morisco population, descendants of Muslims who converted to Christianity at threat of exile. The Moriscos had been kept separate from the main population by a variety of decrees that prohibited them from holding public office, entering the priesthood, or taking certain other positions; as a result, the Moriscos had maintained their own culture rather than assimilated. Some of them did, in fact, still practice forms of crypto-Islam.

Ribera despised the Moriscos as heretics and traitors, a dislike he shared with much of Valencia's Christian populace. With the Duke of Lerma, Ribera helped convince Philip III to at least expel the Moriscos instead. Ribera helped sell the plan by noting that all the property of the Moriscos could be impounded to provide money for the treasury. In 1609, the expulsion of the Moriscos from Spain was decreed. Ribera's original proposal was in fact more extreme: he favored enslaving the entire Morisco population for work in galleys, mines, and abroad. Ribera said that Philip III could do so "without any scruples of conscience," but this proposal was rejected. If the Moriscos were to be expelled, Ribera favored enslaving and Christianizing at least the children of the Moriscos "for the good of their souls" and exiling the parents. This was also rejected, though children under 16 years of age who wished to remain in Spain were allowed, an offer very few took.

== Canonization ==
Efforts to canonize Ribera, who himself had been active in attempting to canonize Ignatius of Loyola, began shortly after his death. Two concerns were raised about his possible sainthood: his failure to hold a provincial council as mandated by the Council of Trent, and his role in the expulsion of the Moriscos. His supporters played up Ribera's adherence to other parts of the Council of Trent, and tried to present the Moriscos as unconvertible ("[His conversion attempts] had no more effect on the Moriscos as if they had been stones"). Still, efforts proceeded apace, with various admiring biographies (vidas) of Ribera being published. Ribera was beatified on 18 September 1796. The cause for his canonization was officially opened on 25 November 1925, and the process of evaluating a miracle attributed to Ribera began on 26 August 1934. In 1960, his canonization was completed under the auspices of Pope John XXIII.

Catholic Church titles
