= Diocese of Cartagena =

Roman Catholic diocese in Spain

Diocese of Cartagena Dioecesis Carthaginensis in Hispania Diócesis de Cartagena

Catholic
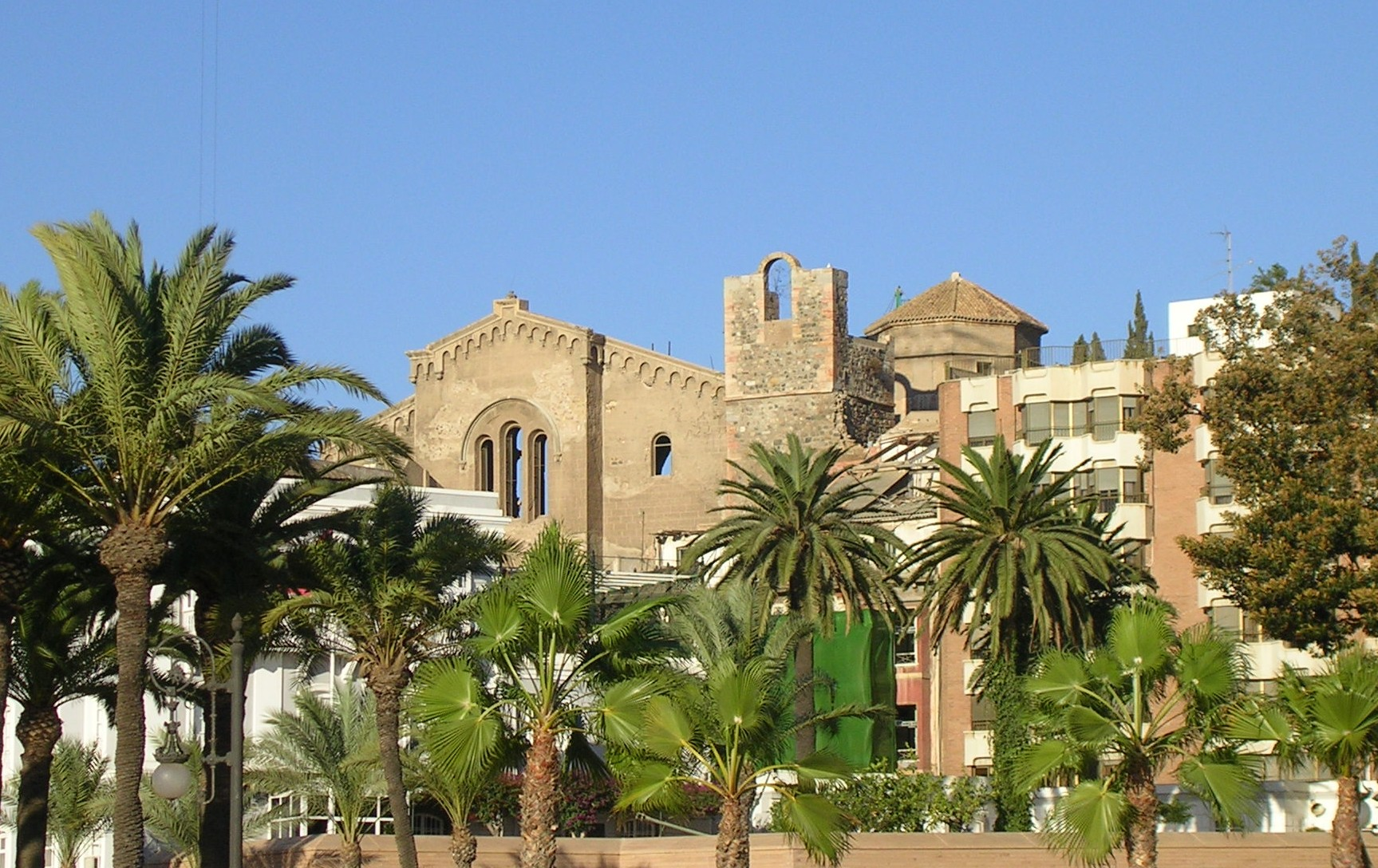
- The former Cartagena Cathedral

Location
- Country: Spain
- Ecclesiastical province: Granada
- Metropolitan: Granada

Statistics
- Area: 11,319 km^{2} (4,370 sq mi)
- Population: Total; Catholics: (as of 2006); 1,335,792; 1,195,792 (89.5%)

Information
- Rite: Latin Rite
- Established: 1st Century
- Cathedral: Cathedral of Saint Mary in Murcia

Current leadership
- Pope: Leo XIV
- Bishop: José Manuel Lorca Planes
- Metropolitan Archbishop: Francisco Javier Martínez Fernández

Website
- Website of the Diocese

The Diocese of Cartagena (Latin: Carthaginen(sis) in Hispania) is a Latin Church diocese of the Catholic Church in the city of Cartagena in the ecclesiastical province of Granada in Spain.

== History ==
=== Ancient Diocese ===
There is a tradition that James the Greater established the ancient diocese of Cartagena in the first century AD, and there is a bishop documented during the persecution of Diocletian. In 325, Cartagena was elevated to the status of a Metropolitan Archdiocese as the capital of Carthaginensis province.

In 552 Byzantine troops established the province of Spania with its capital at Cartagena wresting it from Visigothic control and the primary status for the Visigothic territories went to Toledo. In 623 Byzantine Cartagena was destroyed by the Visigoths with the bishop of Cartagena fleeimg to the fortified Begastri, and setting up the see there. Bigastro is now a titular see.

In 988, some time after the Muslim invasion of Spain, a former bishop of Cartagena is noted. however the diocese was suppressed, around the year 1000, partly due to Muslim rule and partly Cartagena's lesser importance.

=== Reconquista and Restoration ===
In 1243, after Murcia had become a vassal of Castile, Prince Alfonso of Castile petitioned Pope Innocent IV to restore the Diocese of Cartagena. In 1248, the Pope commissioned a study on the diocese's background, resulting in the papal bull Spiritus exultante, issued in Rome on 31 July 1250, which communicated to Ferdinand III of Castile the restoration of the diocese. The Pope appointed Franciscan Friar Pedro Gallego, confessor to Prince Alfonso, as the first bishop of Cartagena, immediately subject to the Holy See.

The city of Cartagena at that time was significantly diminished, having lost the importance it once held under Carthage and the Roman Empire. However, it was one of the few fully Castilian jurisdictions in a kingdom still largely under protectorate. The restoration of the episcopal see, according to Rubio Paredes and other scholars, was driven more by sentimental and historical reasons such as the former importance of the city and the primacy of the diocese over other dioceses in Spain, rather than the city's status at the time. The restoration of the episcopal seat also aligned with Alfonso's aspirations to restore the old Roman order as both part of his imperial policy and his ambition to be crowned Emperor of the Holy Roman Empire.

However, the situation changed from 1266 onwards. In that year, after the Mudéjar Revolt of 1264–1266 was suppressed by James I of Aragon, Castile took control of the entire Kingdom of Murcia, including its capital. This led to a gradual inclination to transfer religious institutions to that city, as evidenced by the privilege granted by Alfonso X and signed in Burgos in 1277, in which he ordered the transfer of the Royal Monastery of Santa María that he founded from Cartagena to the Alcázar of Murcia. In 1266, the diocesan boundaries were established: since the ancient boundaries were unknown, the diocese was assigned the territory of the Kingdom of Murcia.

In 1271 and 1293, some portions of territory that were still under Arab domination were donated to the diocese, laying the foundations for the diocese's expansion throughout the following century.

=== Transfer to Murcia ===
The bishop elect Diego de Magaz (who didn't live long enough to be consecrated) decided to request the transfer of the episcopal see to Murcia in 1278, which was first refused by Pope Nicholas III. The prelate then waited, eventually renewing his request to Pope Nicholas IV. The pope entrusted two clerics under the jurisdiction of the Archdiocese of Tarragona to inquire into the matter.

It would be under Bishop Diego Martínez Magaz that the transfer of the diocesan capital to Murcia would be formalized in 1291 with the consent of King Sancho IV. The bishop had already been residing de facto in Murcia for some time and now the episcopal seat and chapter was moved to Murcia. But Sancho had been excommunicated for opposing his father Alfonso X and bigamously marrying María de Molina. The king also could not transfer a diocese that directly answered to the pope. As a result, the diocese although based in Murcia retained the name Carthaginensis, and continues to do so.

As a result of the transfer, the old mosque of Murcia, converted into the main church of Santa María in 1266, now became Murcia Cathedral. In 1394, the construction of the current Gothic cathedral began.

=== Fifteenth to Twentieth Century ===
Until 1492, the Diocese of Cartagena was a diocese immediately subject to the Holy See, as its antiquity and former rank caused various disputes with the archdioceses of Toledo and Tarragona. On July 9, 1492, it became part of the ecclesiastical province of the Archdiocese of Valencia, due to the establishment of this archdiocese by the Valencian Pope Alexander VI. Meanwhile, as a consequence of the reestablishment of the dioceses of Guadix (1486) and Almería (1492), the diocese's territory was reduced in size.

Since its restoration, the diocesan geographical boundaries had corresponded to those of the Castilian Kingdom of Murcia. However, following the Treaty of Torrellas in 1304, the area of Orihuela, Elche, and Alicante became part of the Kingdom of Valencia, although they continued to belong ecclesiastically to the Diocese of Cartagena.

On July 14, 1564, through the bull Pro excellenti Sedis Apostolicae, the diocese ceded the current Province of Alicante to establish the Diocese of Orihuela (now Diocese of Orihuela-Alicante) by Pope Pius V. This separation also resulted in the transfer of the Diocese of Cartagena's affiliation from the Archdiocese of Valencia to that of Toledo.

On August 19, 1592, the bishop Sancho Dávila founded the Diocesan Seminary, named after Saint Fulgencio, one of the four Cartagena saints, a bishop of Cartagena during the Visigothic period.

The tenure of the powerful Cardinal Belluga as bishop of Cartagena between 1705 and 1724 marked substantial progress in the diocesan structure including the founding of colleges. The 18th century also saw the construction of a new facade and the tower of Murcia Cathedral.

By virtue of the Concordat of 1851, the Diocese of Cartagena became a suffragan of the Archdiocese of Granada. The same concordat ordered the cessation of territorial jurisdiction by the military orders, which was sanctioned by Pope Pius IX with the bull Quo gravius on July 14, 1873. As a consequence, the vicariates of Beas and Segura were divided between the dioceses of Cartagena and Jaén.

=== Twentieth Century ===
Between 1949 and 1957 three Papal Bulls ceded territory to the dioceses of Albacete, Orihuela-Alicante and Diocese of Almería so that the diocese had the same boundaries as the Region of Murcia

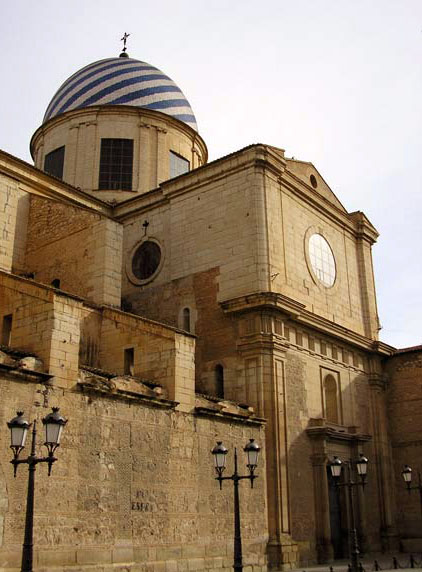
Basilica of the Immaculate Conception of Mary, in Yecla

On 18 May 2020, Cartagena Bishop José Manuel Lorca Planes announced the start of an "important inquiry" into sex abuse allegations spanning from 1950 to 2010. At least eight potential victims have publicly come forward, and Lorca urged more accusers to publicly come forward as well.

== Special churches ==
- Minor Basilicas:
  - Basílica de la Purísima Concepción, Yecla (Murcia), Región de Murcia

== Leadership ==
- Bishops of Cartagena (Roman rite)

. . .

- Pedro Gallego, O.F.M. (1241–1267 Died)

. . .

- Nicolás Yáñez Gutiérrez de Aguilar (4 Aug 1361 – 1372 Died)

. . .

- Rodrigo de Borja (8 Jul 1482 – 11 Aug 1492 Elected, Pope)
- Bernardino López de Carvajal y Sande (27 Mar 1493 – 2 Feb 1495 Appointed, Bishop of Sigüenza)
- Juan Ruiz de Medina (20 Feb 1495 – 1502 Appointed, Bishop of Segovia)
- Juan Daza (16 Mar 1502 – 4 Nov 1504 Appointed, Bishop of Córdoba)
- Juan Fernández Velasco (4 Nov 1505 Appointed – 22 Dec 1505 Appointed, Bishop of Calahorra y La Calzada)
- Martín Fernández de Angulo Saavedra y Luna (22 Dec 1508 – 30 Sep 1510, Appointed, Bishop of Córdoba)
- Matthäus Lang von Wellenburg (30 Sep 1510 – 30 Mar 1540 Died)
- Juan Martínez Silíceo (23 Feb 1541 – 8 Jan 1546 Appointed, Archbishop of Toledo)
- Esteban Almeida (16 Apr 1546 – 23 Mar 1563 Died)
- Gonzalo Arias Gallego (22 Aug 1565 – 28 Apr 1575 Died)
- Gómez Zapata (11 Apr 1576 – 8 Nov 1582 Appointed, Bishop of Cuenca)
- Jerónimo Manrique de Lara (19 Jan 1583 – 5 Apr 1591 Appointed, Bishop of Ávila)
- Sancho Dávila Toledo (26 Apr 1591 – 10 Jan 1600 Appointed, Bishop of Jaén)
- Juan de Zúñiga Flores (24 Jan 1600 Appointed – 20 Dec 1602 Died)
- Alfonso Coloma (13 Jan 1603 – 20 Apr 1608 Died)
- Francisco Martínez de Cenicero (13 Aug 1607 – 3 Aug 1615 Appointed, Bishop of Jaén)
- Francisco González Zárate (de Gamarra) (17 Aug 1615 – 30 May 1616 Appointed, Bishop of Ávila)
- Alfonso Márquez de Prado (18 Jul 1616 – 9 Jul 1618 Appointed, Bishop of Segovia)
- Antonio Trejo de Sande Paniagua, O.F.M. (9 Jul 1618 – 21 Dec 1636 Died)
- Francisco de Manso Zuñiga y Sola (5 Oct 1637 – 8 Oct 1640 Appointed, Archbishop of Burgos)
- Mendo de Benavides (19 Nov 1640 – 17 Oct 1644 Died)
- Juan Vélez de Valdivielso (21 Aug 1645 – 1 Jul 1648 Died)
- Diego Martínez Zarzosa (1 Mar 1649 – 31 Jan 1656 Appointed, Bishop of Málaga)
- Andrés Bravo de Salamanca (18 Sep 1656 – 13 Mar 1662 Appointed, Bishop of Sigüenza)
- Juan Bravo Lasprilla (31 Jul 1662 – 17 Aug 1663 Died)
- Mateo de Sagade de Bugueyro (28 Jan 1664 – 26 Aug 1672 Died)
- Francisco de Rojas-Borja y Artés (29 May 1673 – 17 Jul 1684 Died)
- Antonio Medina Cachon y Ponce de Leon (5 Feb 1685 – 20 Sep 1694 Died)
- Máximo Francisco Joániz de Echalaz (16 May 1695 – 17 Nov 1695 Died)
- Francisco Fernández de Angulo (18 Jun 1696 – 29 Sep 1704 Died)
- Luis Antonio Belluga y Moncada, C.O. (9 Feb 1705 – 11 Sep 1724 Resigned)
- Tomás José Ruiz Montes (11 Sep 1724 – 11 Dec 1741 Died)
- Juan Mateo López Sáenz, C.R.M. (9 Jul 1742 – 14 Oct 1752 Died)
- Diego Rojas y Contreras (12 Mar 1753 – 10 Nov 1772 Died)
- Manuel Rubín y Celis (15 Mar 1773 – 9 Aug 1784 Died)
- Manuel Felipe Miralles (27 Jun 1785 – 15 Jul 1788 Died)
- Victoriano López Gonzalo (14 Dec 1789 – 21 Nov 1805 Died)
- José Jiménez (31 Mar 1806 – 1 Dec 1820 Died)
- Antonio Posada Rubín de Celis (29 Jun 1821 – 18 Mar 1825 Resigned)
- José Antonio Azpeitia y Sáenz de Santamaria (19 Dec 1824 – 1 Nov 1840 Died)
- Mariano Benito Barrio Fernández (17 Dec 1847 – 18 Jun 1861 Confirmed, Archbishop of Valencia)
- Francisco Landeira y Sevilla (22 Jul 1861 – 16 Sep 1876 Died)
- Diego Mariano Alguacil y Rodríguez (18 Dec 1876 – 10 Jan 1884 Died)
- Tomás Bryan y Livermore (10 Nov 1884 Appointed – 11 Sep 1902 Died)
- Vicente Alonso y Salgado, Sch. P. (25 Jun 1903 – Jun 1930 Died)
- Miguel de los Santos Díaz y Gómara (28 Jan 1935 – 7 Nov 1949 Died)
- Ramón Sanahuja y Marcé (13 May 1950 – 22 Apr 1969 Retired)
- Miguel Roca Cabanellas (22 Apr 1969 – 25 May 1978 Appointed, Archbishop of Valencia)
- Javier Azagra Labiano (23 Sep 1978 – 20 Feb 1998 Retired)
- Manuel Ureña Pastor (1 Jul 1998 – 2 Apr 2005 Appointed, Archbishop of Zaragoza)
- Juan Antonio Reig Pla (24 Sep 2005 – 7 Mar 2009 Appointed, Bishop of Alcala)
- José Manuel Lorca Planes (18 Jul 2009 – )

== See also ==
- Roman Catholicism in Spain

== Sources ==
- GCatholic.org
- Catholic Hierarchy
- Diocese website
