= Juan Ruiz de Medina =

Spanish Roman Catholic prelate

Most Reverend Juan Ruiz de Medina
- Bishop of Segovia
- Church: Catholic Church
- Archdiocese: Diocese of Segovia
- In office: 1502–1507
- Predecessor: Juan Arias de Villar
- Successor: Fadrique de Portugal Noreña
- Previous posts: Bishop of Astorga (1489–1493); Bishop of Badajoz (1493–1495); Bishop of Cartagena (1495–1502)

Personal details
- Died: 30 January 1507 Segovia, Spain

Juan Ruiz de Medina (died 30 January 1507) was a Roman Catholic prelate who served as Bishop of Segovia (1502–1507), Bishop of Cartagena (1495–1502), Bishop of Badajoz (1493–1495), and Bishop of Astorga (1489–1493).

== Biography ==
In 1489, Juan Ruiz de Medina was selected by the King of Spain and confirmed by Pope Innocent VIII as Bishop of Astorga. On March 27, 1493, he was appointed by Pope Alexander VI as Bishop of Badajoz. On 20 February 1495, he was appointed by Pope Alexander VI as Bishop of Cartagena. In 1502, he was appointed by Pope Alexander VI as Bishop of Segovia. He served as Bishop of Segovia until his death on 30 January 1507.

== External links and additional sources ==
- Cheney, David M. "Diocese of Astorga". Catholic-Hierarchy.org. (for Chronology of Bishops) ^{[self-published]}
- Chow, Gabriel. "Diocese of Astorga (Spain)". GCatholic.org. (for Chronology of Bishops) ^{[self-published]}
- Cheney, David M. "Diocese of Cartagena". Catholic-Hierarchy.org. (for Chronology of Bishops) ^{[self-published]}
- Chow, Gabriel. "Diocese of Cartagena". GCatholic.org. (for Chronology of Bishops) ^{[self-published]}
- Cheney, David M. "Diocese of Segovia". Catholic-Hierarchy.org. (for Chronology of Bishops) ^{[self-published]}
- Chow, Gabriel. "Diocese of Segovia (Spain)". GCatholic.org. (for Chronology of Bishops) ^{[self-published]}

Catholic Church titles
Preceded by Bernardino López de Carvajal y Sande	Bishop of Astorga; 1489–1493	Succeeded by Diego Meléndez de Valdés
Preceded by Bernardino López de Carvajal y Sande	Bishop of Badajoz; 1493–1495	Succeeded by Juan Rodríguez de Fonseca
Preceded by Bernardino López de Carvajal y Sande	Bishop of Cartagena; 1495–1502	Succeeded by Juan Daza
Preceded by Juan Arias de Villar	Bishop of Segovia; 1502–1507	Succeeded by Fadrique de Portugal Noreña
