= Carlos Coloma =

Spanish military commander, diplomat and author

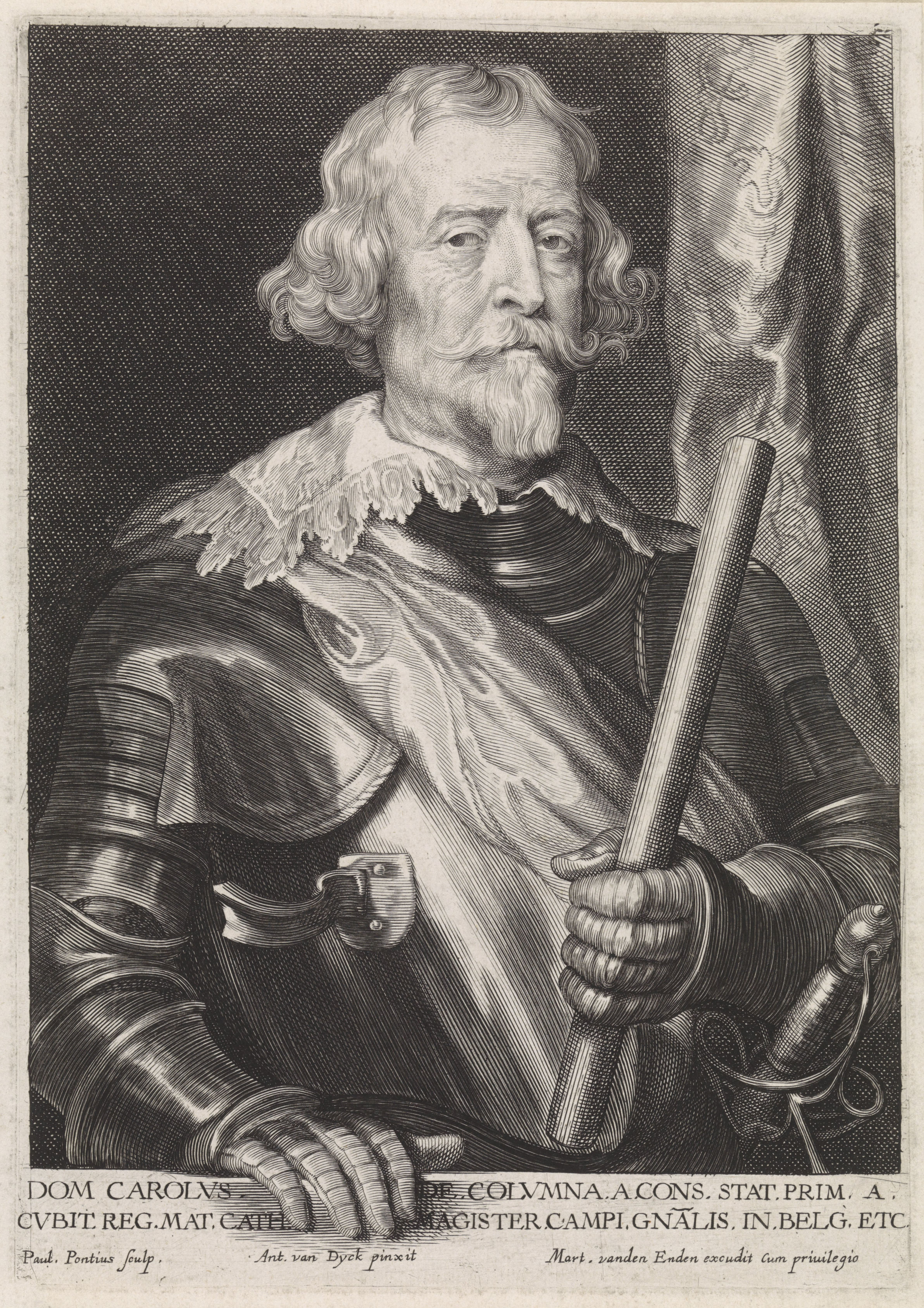
A portrait of Carlos Coloma, engraved by Paulus Pontius after Anthony van Dyck.

Don Carlos II Coloma y de Saa, knight of Santiago, 1st Marquess of Espinar (Alicante, 9 February 1566 – 23 November 1637, Madrid) was a Spanish military commander, diplomat and author. He is also known as a translator of Tacitus.

== Family ==
Coloma was born in the important House of Coloma. He was the fourth son out of 14 children from the third marriage of don Juan IV Coloma y Cardona, 1st Count of Elda. His older brother Alfonso Coloma was bishop of Barcelona. He married a Flemish noblewoman, Marguerite of Gavere-Liedekercke, Noble canoness of the Saint Waltrude Collegiate Church. Marguerite was a daughter of Anthony I van Liederkerke and Louise de la Barre. They had 4 sons and 6 daughters.

- don Antonio de Coloma
- don Carlos IV Ignatio de Coloma
- don Antonio de Coloma
- dona Maria de Coloma, marr. don Nicolas de Velasco.
- doña Jeronima de Coloma
- doña Juana de Coloma
- doña Margaritavde Coloma
- doña Isabella de Coloma
- doña Blanca de Coloma
- doña Luisa de Coloma

== Career ==
His father was also a soldier and a writer. Coloma joined the army as an ensign in 1581 and campaigned in Portugal, Sicily, the Netherlands and Germany, eventually making his way up to the rank of maestro de campo general or field marshal (in command of a tercio). He played an important part in the Siege of Doullens (1595). After serving as governor of the Roussillon (1600–1611) and viceroy of Mallorca (1611–1617), he became governor of Cambrai in 1617. In 1621 he took over from Spinola as commander-in-chief of the Spanish invasion of the Electorate of the Palatinate. The following year he succeeded the Count of Gondomar as Spanish ambassador to England. Recalled when war broke out between England and Spain in 1624, he participated in Spinola's Siege of Breda (August 1624 – June 1625) and is supposedly portrayed on Velázquez' Las Lanzas. After a term as commander in Milan, Coloma returned to London in 1630 to restore peace between the two crowns. From 1631 until his return to Spain in 1634, he acted as commander-in-chief of the Army of Flanders. During his final years he served King Philip IV as mayordomo mayor and member of the Council of State.

Coloma received the habit of the Order of Santiago in 1591 and was given the Commandry of Montiel y La Ossa in 1621. On 16 September 1627, Philip IV created him Marquess of Espinar.

== Works ==
- Carlos Coloma, De las guerras de los Estados Baxos, desde el año de M.D.LXXXVIII. hasta el de M.D.XC.IX (Cambrai, Jean de la Rivière, 1622). Further editions: Antwerp 1624 and 1635 and Barcelona 1627. Recently, April 2010, Antonio CORTIJO OCAÑA(http://www.gbv.de/dms/sub-hamburg/334516609.pdf), has coordinated a new edition and study, based in the 1625 edition made at Antwerp, now Belgium, for the Spanish Ministry of Defense, ISBN, 978-84-9781-551-3, 766 pages.
- Tacitus, Obras de Cajo Cornelio Tacito, Carlos Coloma transl. (Douai, Wyon, 1629).
