= Juan Arias de Villar =

Spanish Roman Catholic prelate

Most Reverend Juan Arias de Villar
- Bishop of Segovia
- Church: Catholic Church
- Archdiocese: Diocese of Segovia
- In office: 1498–1501
- Predecessor: Juan Arias de Ávila
- Successor: Juan Ruiz de Medina
- Previous post: Bishop of Oviedo (1487–1498)

Personal details
- Died: 1501 Segovia, Spain

Juan Arias de Villar (died 1501) was a Roman Catholic prelate who served as Bishop of Segovia (1498–1501)

== Biography ==
In 1487, Juan Arias de Villar was selected by the King of Spain and confirmed by Pope Innocent VIII as Bishop of Oviedo (1487–1498). In 1498, he was appointed by Pope Alexander VI as Bishop of Segovia. He served as Bishop of Segovia until his death in 1501.

== External links and additional sources ==
- Cheney, David M. "Metropolitan Archdiocese of Oviedo". Catholic-Hierarchy.org. (for Chronology of Bishops) ^{[self-published]}
- Chow, Gabriel. "Archdiocese of Oviedo (Spain)". GCatholic.org. (for Chronology of Bishops) ^{[self-published]}
- Cheney, David M. "Diocese of Segovia". Catholic-Hierarchy.org. (for Chronology of Bishops) ^{[self-published]}
- Chow, Gabriel. "Diocese of Segovia (Spain)". GCatholic.org. (for Chronology of Bishops) ^{[self-published]}

Catholic Church titles
Preceded by Gonzalo de Villadiego	Bishop of Oviedo; 1487–1498	Succeeded by Juan Daza
Preceded by Juan Arias de Ávila	Bishop of Segovia; 1498–1501	Succeeded by Juan Ruiz de Medina
