= Juan IV Coloma y Cardona, 1st Count of Elda =

Juan IV Coloma y Cardona, 1st Count of Elda, (circa 1522 – Elda, province of Alicante, Spain, 19 October 1586) was the 3rd Sieur of Elda, the Governor of Alicante Castle, Count of Elda and Viceroy of Sardinia between 1570-1577.

== Family ==
He was born member of the House of Coloma, and was the son of Juan III Francisco Coloma, 3rd Lord of Alfajarin, 2nd Lord of Elda, Salinas and Petrer. His mother was dona Catherina de Cardona. Juan IV married three times, his third wife was doňa Isabela de Saa’, lady at the court of Portugal.

By royal decree in 1577 he became the 1st Count of Elda. He resided in Elda Castle.

=== Children ===
- don Luis I Antonio Coloma, 2nd Count of Elda: Knight of Santiago, Viceroy of Sardinia;
  Married to doña Juana Henriques de Mendoza.
  - don Juan V Coloma, 3rd Count of Elda: knight of Santiago, Lord of the Chamber of Felipe III.
- don Alfonso Coloma: bishop of Barcelona.
- don Francisco II Coloma: Knight of Malta.
- don Diego Coloma: Canon at Valencia Cathedral.
- don Luis Coloma
- doña Maria;
  married to don Pedro de Zúñiga.
- doña Isabella Coloma
- doña Guyomara Coloma
- doña Ana Coloma
- doña Blanca Coloma
- don Carlos II de Coloma, died 1637: knight of Santiago, created Marquess of Espinar, Governor of Cambrai;
  Married to Margharethe de Gavere, Noble canonesse of Saint Waltrude Collegiate Church, she died on 3 April 1645 in Brussels.
- doña Juana Coloma
- doña Luisa Coloma
