= Giovanni Antonio Sangiorgio =

Italian canon lawyer and cardinal (died 1509)

Giovanni Antonio Sangiorgio (died 14 March 1509) was an Italian canon lawyer and cardinal. Agostino Oldoino calls him the leading jurisconsult of his age. Kenneth Pennington has called him one of the ‘last two great commentators on feudal law’.

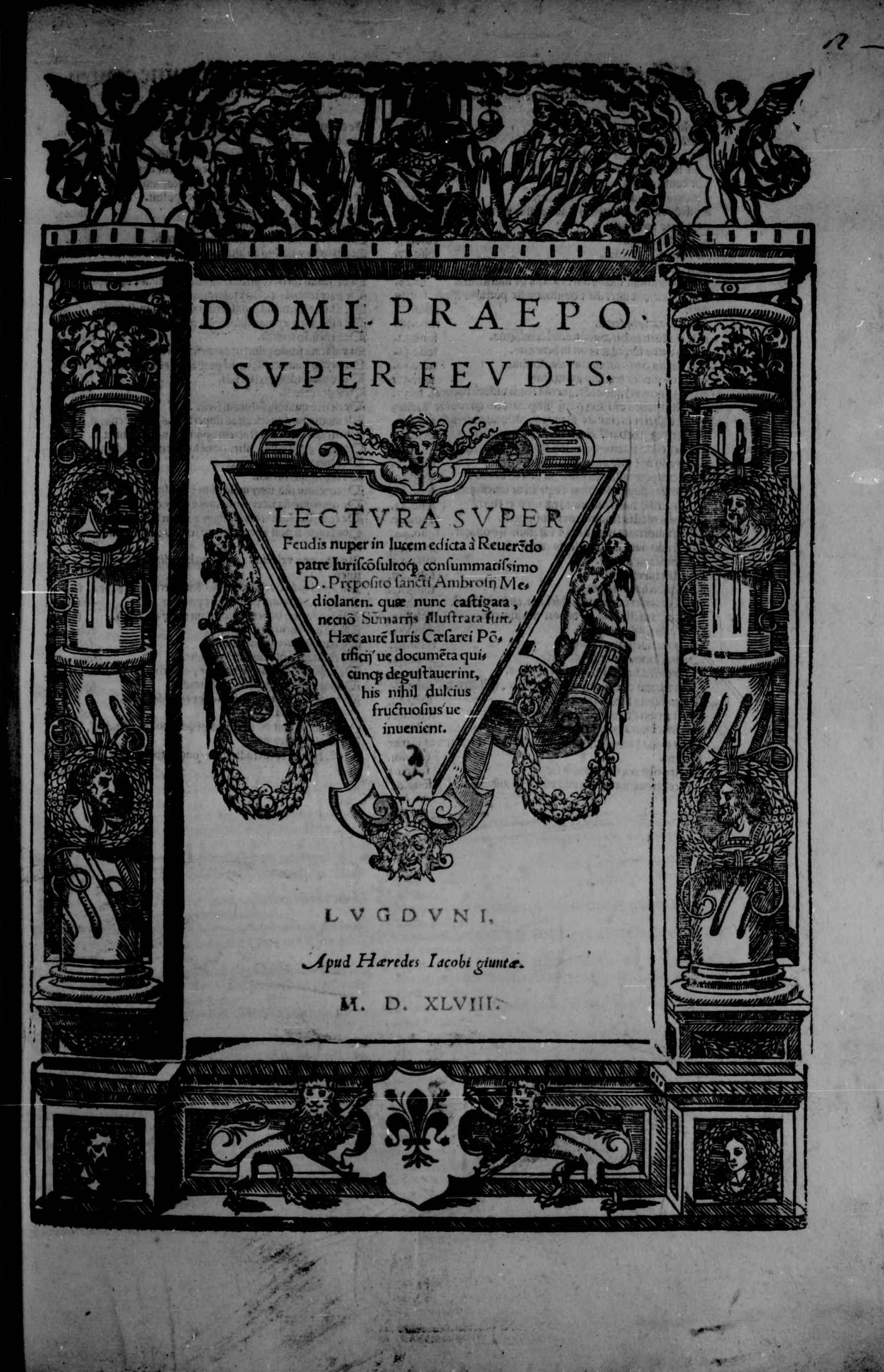
Super usibus feudorum, 1548 edition

== Early career ==
Sangiorgio was born in Milan. He had taught Canon Law at the University of Pavia. He was Provost of the Collegiate Church of S. Ambrogio in Milan. In Rome, he became a Papal Referendary and an Auditor (judge) of the Sacred Roman Rota (Court of Appeal). He was bishop of Alessandria from 1478 to 1500, having been appointed by Pope Sixtus IV at the special request of the Duke of Milan, Gian Galeazzo Sforza. He then served as Sforza's ambassador to King Matthias Corvinus of Hungary.

== Cardinal ==
In the Consistory of 20 September 1493, Pope Alexander VI created him a cardinal, and assigned him the titular church of Ss. Nereus and Achilles. He was referred to as the Cardinal of Alessandria.

He was transferred to the diocese of Parma on 6 September 1499.

Cardinal Sangiorgio attended the papal Conclave of September 1503 and was the senior cardinal-priest present. He was already present at the first preliminary Congregation on 19 August 1503. He was not the favoured candidate of any secular power or faction of cardinals, though he voted with the cardinals who favoured the French. The Conclave opened on 16 September, and on the first ballot on 21 September, Sangiorgio received eight votes of the 105 that were cast. Cardinal Piccolomini of Siena was elected on 22 September, taking the name Pius III. He reigned only twenty-six days, dying on 18 October.

The Conclave to elect a successor to Pius III began on 31 October, with virtually the same participants as a month before. On 1 November 1503, Cardinal Giuliano della Rovere received all the votes cast, except for nine scattered votes. Sangiorgio received no votes. Cardinal della Rovere became Pope Julius II.

On 22 December 1503, Sangiorgio was promoted to the rank (ordo) of Cardinal Bishop, and assigned the Suburbicarian See of Tusculum (Frascati). On 17 September 1507, he was moved to the Suburbicarian diocese of Praeneste (Palestrina). On 22 September 1508, he was promoted to the Suburbicarian See of Sabina.

== Papal legate in Rome ==
In August 1506, when Pope Julius led the papal army north to retake the states of Perugia and Bologna from their Borgia tyrants, Giampaolo Baglione and Giovanni Bentivoglio, he left Cardinal Sangiorgio behind in Rome as his Legatus a latere, to govern in his absence. During his absence from Parma, as a Cardinal Bishop in Rome, Sangiorgio administered the church of Parma through Vicars and Procurators (solicitors); in 1505, his Vicar was Msgr. Giambatista Capitani, a Canon of the Cathedral Chapter of Novara, and in 1506, Msgr. Giovanni Luchino, Dean of the Cathedral Chapter of Alessandria, filled the same office.

Sangiorgio died in Rome on 14 or 28 March 1509. Umberto Benassi gives the date of 27 March, based on a dispatch of the Venetian ambassador in Rome dated 28 March. In his Last Will and Testament Sangiorgio named the Confraternity of the Saviour at the Sancta Sanctorum (Societas Salvatoris ad Sancta Sanctorum) as his heir, as his tombstone testifies.

== Works ==
His De appellationibus, from the time before he became a bishop, was an early printed book (Como: Ambrogio d'Orco e Dionigi Paravicino, V id. aug. [9 VIII] 1474). He also wrote the Commentaria in Feudorum Libri Tres.

=== Editions ===
- Super usibus feudorum (in Latin). Pavia. 1490.
- Super usibus feudorum (in Latin). Lyon: Jacques Giunta, héritiers. 1548.
- Commentaria in Feudorum Libri III (in Latin). Frankfurt am Main: Sumptibus Clementis Schleichii. 1629.

== Bibliography ==
- Allodi, Giovanni Maria (1856). Serie cronologica dei vescovi di Parma con alcuni cenni sui principali avvenimenti civili (in Italian). Vol. II. Parma: P. Fiaccadori. pp. 5–11.
- Cardella, Lorenzo (1793). Memorie storiche de' cardinali della santa Romana chiesa (in Italian). Vol. Tomo secondo (2). Roma: nella stamperia Pagliarini. pp. 251–252.
- Eubel, Conradus, ed. (1914). Hierarchia catholica (in Latin). Vol. Tomus 2 (second ed.). Münster: Libreria Regensbergiana.
- Eubel, Conradus; Gulik, Guilelmus (1923). Hierarchia catholica (in Latin). Vol. Tomus 3 (second ed.). Münster: Libreria Regensbergiana.
- Ughelli, Ferdinando; Coleti, Niccolò (1717). Italia sacra sive De Episcopis Italiae, et insularum adjacentium (in Latin). Vol. Tomus II. Venice: apud Sebastianum Coleti. p. 187.
