= Martín Fernández de Angulo Saavedra y Luna =

Spanish Roman Catholic prelate

Most Reverend Martín Fernández de Angulo Saavedra y Luna
- Bishop of Córdoba
- Church: Catholic Church
- Diocese: Diocese of Córdoba
- In office: 1510–1516
- Successor: Alonso Manrique de Lara
- Previous post: Bishop of Cartagena (1508–1510)

Personal details
- Died: 21 June 1516 Córdoba, Andalusia, Spain

Martín Fernández de Angulo Saavedra y Luna (died 21 June 1516) was a Roman Catholic prelate who served as Bishop of Córdoba (1510–1516) and Bishop of Cartagena (1508–1510).

== Biography ==
On 22 December 1508, Martín Fernández de Angulo Saavedra y Luna was selected by the King of Spain and confirmed by Pope Julius II as Bishop of Cartagena. On 30 September 1510, he was selected by the King of Spain and confirmed by Pope Julius II as Bishop of Córdoba. He served as Bishop of Córdoba until his death on 21 June 1516.

== External links and additional sources ==
- Cheney, David M. "Diocese of Cartagena". Catholic-Hierarchy.org. (for Chronology of Bishops) ^{[self-published]}
- Chow, Gabriel. "Diocese of Cartagena". GCatholic.org. (for Chronology of Bishops) ^{[self-published]}
- Cheney, David M. "Diocese of Córdoba". Catholic-Hierarchy.org. (for Chronology of Bishops) ^{[self-published]}
- Chow, Gabriel. "Diocese of Córdoba". GCatholic.org. (for Chronology of Bishops) ^{[self-published]}

Catholic Church titles
Preceded by Juan Fernández Velasco	Bishop of Cartagena; 1508–1510	Succeeded by Matthäus Lang von Wellenburg
Preceded by	Diocese of Córdoba; 1510–1516	Succeeded by Alonso Manrique de Lara
