= Sancho Dávila Toledo =

Spanish bishop

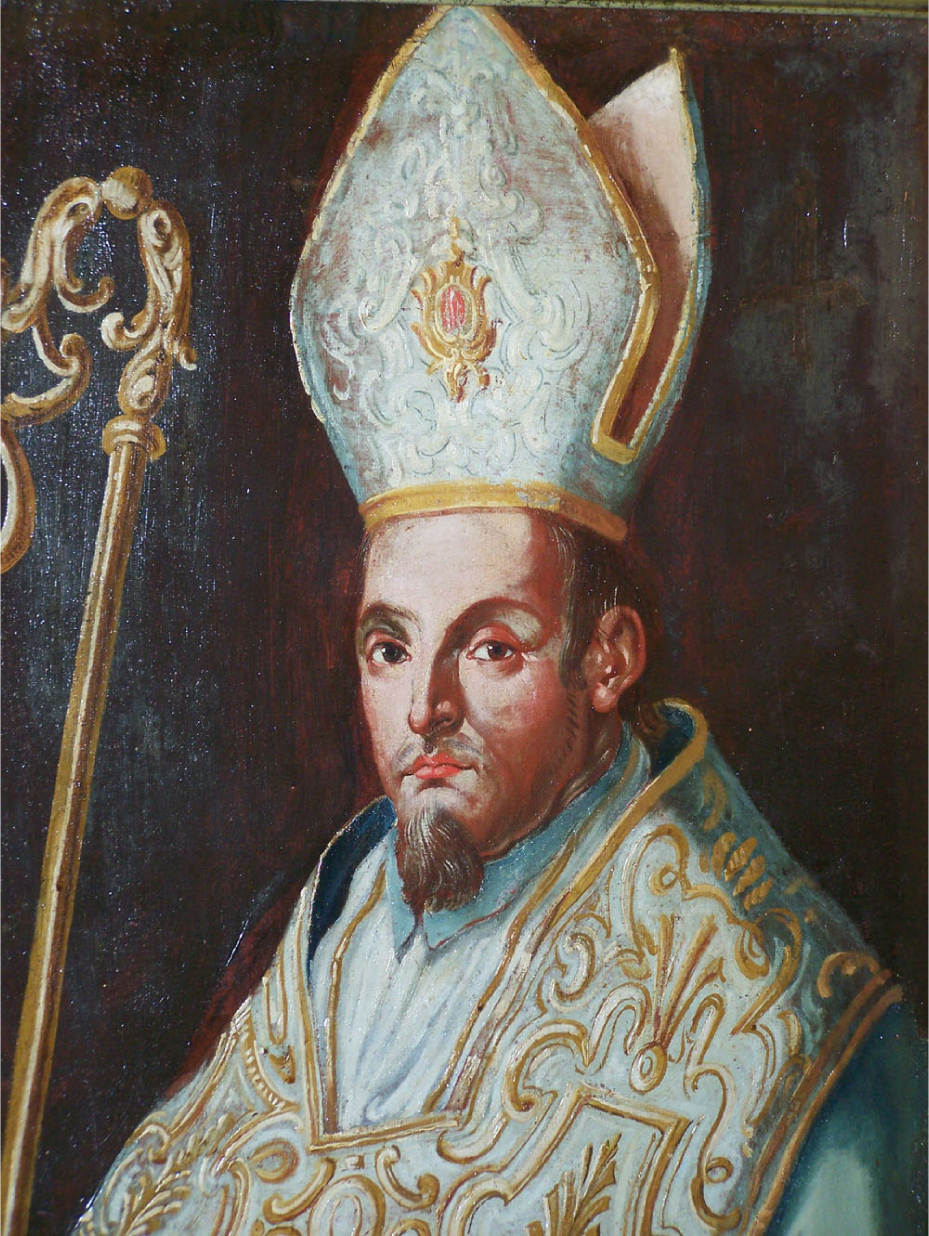
Portrait.

Coat of arms.

Sancho Dávila Toledo (Sancho de Avila) (Ávila, Old Castile, 1546, – Plasencia, Cáceres, 6 or 7 December 1625) was a Spanish bishop. He was of a distinguished family, and was known as a learned preacher.

== Life ==
He completed his ecclesiastical studies and received his doctorate at the University of Salamanca. He was afterwards consecrated bishop and was, at different times, bishop of Cartagena, bishop of Jaen in Andalusia, bishop of Siguenza in Old Castile, in 1615, and, seven years later, bishop of Plasencia, where he remained until his death. He had been a confessor of Theresa of Avila.

== Works ==
His works in Spanish include:

- "The Veneration Due to the Bodies and Relics of Saints" (Madrid, 1611);
- "Sermons" (Baeza, 1615);
- "The Sighs of St. Augustine", from the Latin (Madrid, 1601, 1626);
- and, in manuscript, the Lives of Augustine of Hippo and Thomas Aquinas.

== External links and additional sources ==
- Cheney, David M. "Diocese of Cartagena". Catholic-Hierarchy.org. (for Chronology of Bishops) ^{[self-published]}
- Chow, Gabriel. "Diocese of Cartagena". GCatholic.org. (for Chronology of Bishops) ^{[self-published]}
- Cheney, David M. "Diocese of Jaén". Catholic-Hierarchy.org. (for Chronology of Bishops) ^{[self-published]}
- Chow, Gabriel. "Diocese of Jaén (Spain)". GCatholic.org. (for Chronology of Bishops) ^{[self-published]}
- Cheney, David M. "Diocese of Sigüenza-Guadalajara". Catholic-Hierarchy.org. (for Chronology of Bishops) ^{[self-published]}
- Chow, Gabriel. "Diocese of Sigüenza–Guadalajara (Spain)". GCatholic.org. (for Chronology of Bishops) ^{[self-published]}
- Cheney, David M. "Diocese of Plasencia". Catholic-Hierarchy.org. (for Chronology of Bishops) ^{[self-published]}
- Chow, Gabriel. "Diocese of Plasencia (Spain)". GCatholic.org. (for Chronology of Bishops) ^{[self-published]}

Attribution

Catholic Church titles
Preceded by Jerónimo Manrique de Lara	Bishop of Cartagena; 1591–1600	Succeeded by Juan de Zúñiga Flores
Preceded by Bernardo de Rojas y Sandoval	Bishop of Jaén; 1600–1615	Succeeded by Francisco Martínez de Cenicero
Preceded by Antonio Benegas Figueroa	Bishop of Sigüenza; 1615–1622	Succeeded by Francisco López de Mendoza
Preceded by Enrique Enríquez de Almansa Manrique	Bishop of Plasencia; 1622–1626	Succeeded by Francisco Hurtado de Mendoza y Ribera
