= Fernando Gutiérrez =

Fernando Gutiérrez may refer to:

- Fernando Gutiérrez Tello (fl. 1304–1323), Castilian nobleman
- Fernando Gutiérrez (bishop) (died 1327)
- Fernando Gutiérrez Barrios (1927–2000), Mexican politician
- Fernando Gutiérrez (footballer) (born 1980), Chilean footballer
