= Diocese of Segovia =

Roman Catholic diocese in Spain

Diocese of Segovia Dioecesis Segobiensis Diócesis de Segovia

Catholic
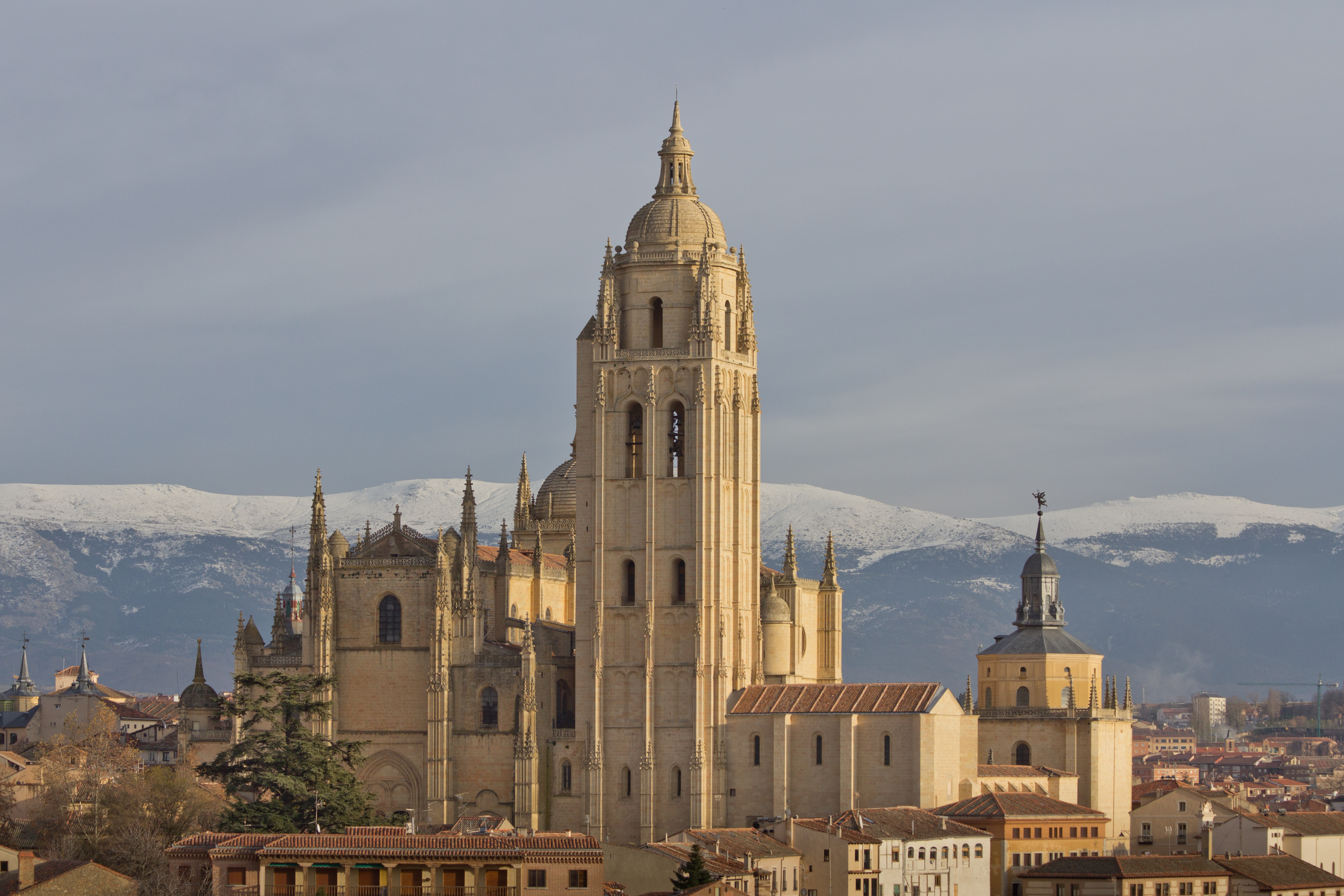
- Segovia Cathedral

Location
- Country: Spain
- Ecclesiastical province: Valladolid
- Metropolitan: Valladolid

Statistics
- Area: 6,949 km^{2} (2,683 sq mi)
- Population: Total; Catholics: (as of 2010); 164,854; 155,200 (94.1%)

Information
- Denomination: Roman Catholic
- Sui iuris church: Latin Church
- Rite: Roman Rite
- Established: 6th Century
- Cathedral: Cathedral of the Assumption of Our Lady in Segovia

Current leadership
- Pope: Leo XIV
- Bishop: Jesús Vidal Chamorro
- Metropolitan Archbishop: Luis Javier Argüello García
- Bishops emeritus: Ángel Rubio Castro; César Augusto Franco Martínez

Map
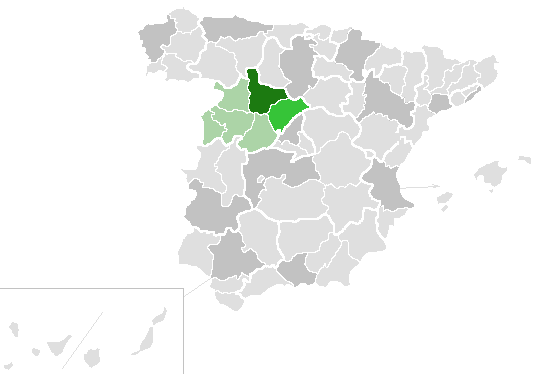

Website
- Website of the Diocese

The Diocese of Segovia (Latin: Dioecesis Segobiensis) is a Latin diocese of the Catholic Church located in the city of Segovia in the ecclesiastical province of Valladolid in Spain.

== History ==
- 6th century: Established as Diocese of Segovia

== Leadership ==
- Gutierre Girón (1195 – 19 Jul 1195 Died)

...

- Ramon Losaza (1249–1259 Appointed Archbishop of Sevilla)
- Martin (1260–1265 Died)

...

- Rodrigo de Tello (5 Jan 1279 – 6 Oct 1288 Appointed Archbishop of Tarragona)

...

- Fernando Sarracín (17 Apr 1301 – 17 Oct 1318 Died)

...

- Juan Sierra (3 Oct 1370 – 16 Feb 1374 Died)
- Hugo de Lamanhania (Magialla) (21 Jul 1374 – 15 Oct 1388 Appointed, Bishop of Cavaillon)
- Juan de Serrano (15 Oct 1388 – 22 Dec 1389 Appointed, Bishop of Sigüenza)
- Lope de Barrientos (21 Feb 1438 – 19 Jul 1441 Appointed, Bishop of Ávila)
- Juan de Cervantes (19 Jul 1441 – 25 Nov 1453 Died)
- Luis de Acuña Osorio (1449–1456 Appointed, Bishop of Burgos)
- Fernando López de Villaescusa (1457–1460)
- Juan Arias de Ávila (1461 – 1497 Died)
- Juan Arias de Villar (1498 – 1501 Died)
- Juan Ruiz de Medina (1502 – 30 Jan 1507 Died)
- Fadrique de Portugal Noreña (22 Dec 1508 – 1511 Resigned)
- Diego Ribera de Toledo (29 Oct 1511 – 6 Feb 1543 Died)
- Antonio Ramírez de Haro (6 Aug 1543 – 16 Sep 1549 Died)
- Gaspar de Zúñiga y Avellaneda (27 Jun 1550 – 21 Oct 1558 Appointed, Archbishop of Santiago de Compostela)
- Francisco de Santa María Benavides Velasco (21 Oct 1558 – 15 May 1560 Died)
- Martín Pérez de Ayala (17 Jul 1560 – 6 Sep 1564 Appointed, Archbishop of Valencia)
- Diego de Covarrubias y Leiva (25 Oct 1564 – 6 Sep 1577 Appointed, Archbishop (Personal Title) of Cuenca)
- Gregorio Antonio Gallo de Andrade (11 Sep 1577 – 25 Sep 1579 Died)
- Luis Tello Maldonado (27 May 1580 – 11 Jun 1581 Died)
- Andrés Cabrera Bobadilla (8 Nov 1582 – 13 Oct 1586 Appointed, Archbishop of Zaragoza)
- Francisco Ribera Obando (17 Dec 1586 – 15 Sep 1587 Died)
- Andrés Pacheco (2 Dec 1587 – 13 Aug 1601 Appointed, Bishop of Cuenca)
- Maximilian of Austria (27 Aug 1601 – 21 Apr 1603 Appointed, Archbishop of Santiago de Compostela)
- Pedro Castro Nero (13 Aug 1603 – 12 Sep 1611 Appointed, Archbishop of Valencia)
- Antonio Idiáquez Manrique (4 Feb 1613 – 17 Nov 1615 Died)
- Juan Vigil de Quiñones y Labiada (18 Jul 1616 – 1 Sep 1617 Died)
- Alfonso Márquez de Prado (9 Jul 1618 – 7 Nov 1621 Died)
- Iñigo Brizuela Artiaga (6 May 1622 – 1624 Resigned)
- Melchor Moscoso Sandoval (29 May 1624 – 1626 Resigned)
- Mendo de Benavides (18 Jul 1633 – 19 Nov 1640 Appointed, Bishop of Cartagena (en España))
- Pedro Tapia (7 Jan 1641 – 24 Apr 1645 Confirmed, Bishop of Sigüenza)
- Pedro Neila (Neyla) (12 Jun 1645 – 1647 Died)
- Francisco Araújo (13 Jan 1648 – 1656 Resigned)
- Juan del Pozo Horta (28 Aug 1656 – 16 Aug 1660 Died)
- Francisco de Zárate y Terán (21 Feb 1661 – 28 Jan 1664 Confirmed, Bishop of Cuenca)
- Diego Escolano y Ledesma (17 Mar 1664 – 27 Feb 1668 Appointed, Archbishop of Granada)
- Jerónimo Mascareñas (9 Apr 1668 – 26 Oct 1671 Died)
- Matías de Moratinos y Santos (3 Oct 1672 – Sep 1682 Died)
- Francisco Antonio Caballero (8 Mar 1683 – 1684 Died)
- Andrés de Angulo (9 Apr 1685 – 1687 Died)
- Fernando Guzmán (bishop) (29 Nov 1688 – 15 Aug 1694 Died)
- Bartolomé de Ocampo y Mata (8 Nov 1694 – 1 Jun 1699 Appointed, Bishop of Plasencia)
- Baltasar de Mendoza y Sandoval (5 Oct 1699 – 4 Nov 1727 Died)
- Domingo Valentín Guerra Arteaga y Leiva (8 Mar 1728 – 29 May 1742 Died)
- Diego García de Medrano (24 Sep 1742 – Mar 1752 Died)
- Manuel Antonio de Murillo y Argáiz (17 Jul 1752 – 1 Jun 1765 Resigned)
- Juan José Martínez Escalzo (5 Jun 1765 – 6 Dec 1773 Died)
- Alonso Marcos de Llanes Argüelles (6 Jun 1774 – 15 Dec 1783 Appointed, Archbishop of Sevilla)
- Juan Francisco Jiménez del Río (14 Feb 1785 – 18 Dec 1795 Appointed, Archbishop of Valencia)
- José Antonio Sáenz Santamaría (24 Jul 1797 – 14 Jan 1813 Died)
- Isidoro Pérez Celis (26 Sep 1814 – 20 Jan 1827 Died)
- Isidoro Bonifacio López Pulido (21 May 1827 – 3 Dec 1827 Died)
- Juan Nepomuceno de Lera y Cano (23 Jun 1828 – 23 Jan 1831 Died)
- Joaquín Briz (24 Feb 1832 – 23 Jan 1837 Died)
- Francisco de La Puente (3 Jul 1848 – 15 Nov 1854 Died)
- Rodrigo Moreno Echevarría y Briones (25 Sep 1857 – 21 Dec 1875 Died)
- Antonio García y Fernández (3 Apr 1876 – 5 Feb 1890 Died)
- José Proceso Pozuelo y Herrero (26 Jun 1890 – 24 Mar 1898 Appointed, Bishop of Córdoba)
- José Ramón Quesada y Gascón (24 Mar 1898 – 13 Sep 1900 Died)
- José Cadena y Eleta (18 Apr 1901 – 14 Nov 1904 Appointed, Bishop of Vitoria)
- Julián Miranda y Ristuer (14 Nov 1904 – 24 Jun 1913 Died)
- Remigio Gandásegui y Gorrochátegui (28 May 1914 – 22 Apr 1920 Appointed, Archbishop of Valladolid)
- Manuel de Castro y Alonso (9 Jul 1920 – 21 May 1928 Appointed, Archbishop of Burgos)
- Luciano Pérez Platero (5 Feb 1929 – 9 Dec 1944 Appointed, Archbishop of Burgos)
- Daniel Llorente y Federico (9 Dec 1944 – 11 Dec 1969 Retired)
- Antonio Palenzuela Velázquez (11 Dec 1969 – 12 May 1995 Retired)
- Luis Gutiérrez Martín (12 May 1995 – 3 Nov 2007 Retired)
- Ángel Rubio Castro (3 Nov 2007 – 12 Nov 2014 Retired)
- César Augusto Franco Martínez (12 Nov 2014 – 3 Dec 2024 Retired)
- Jesús Vidal Chamorro (3 Dec 2024 – present)

== See also ==
- Roman Catholicism in Spain
