= Martín Fernández =

Martín Fernández may refer to:

- Martín Fernández (footballer, born 2001), Uruguayan football midfielder
- Martín Fernández (footballer, born 2003), Uruguayan football midfielder
- Martín Fernández de Angulo Saavedra y Luna (died 1516), Roman Catholic prelate
- Martín Fernández de Enciso (c. 1470–1528), Spanish lawyer, colonial official and geographer
- Martín Fernández de Navarrete (1765–1844), Spanish noble, politician and historian
- Martín Fernández de Vilches (died 1469), Roman Catholic prelate
