= Francisco Torres =

Francisco Torres may refer to:

- Francisco Torres (Jesuit) (born 1509-1584), known as Turrianus, Spanish Jesuit Hellenist and polemist
- Francisco Torres Grijalba (1585-1662), Spanish prelate
- Francisco Torres Sánchez de Roa (1594-1651), Spanish prelate
- Francisco Torres Oliver (born 1935), Spanish translator
- Francisco Torres (Mexican footballer) (born 1983), Mexican football attacking midfielder
- Francisco Torres (Brazilian footballer) (born 1989), Brazilian football striker
