= Cuenca Cathedral =

Gothic cathedral in Castile-La Mancha, Spain

- Cathedral of Saint Mary and Saint Julian
- Catedral de Santa Maria y San Julián
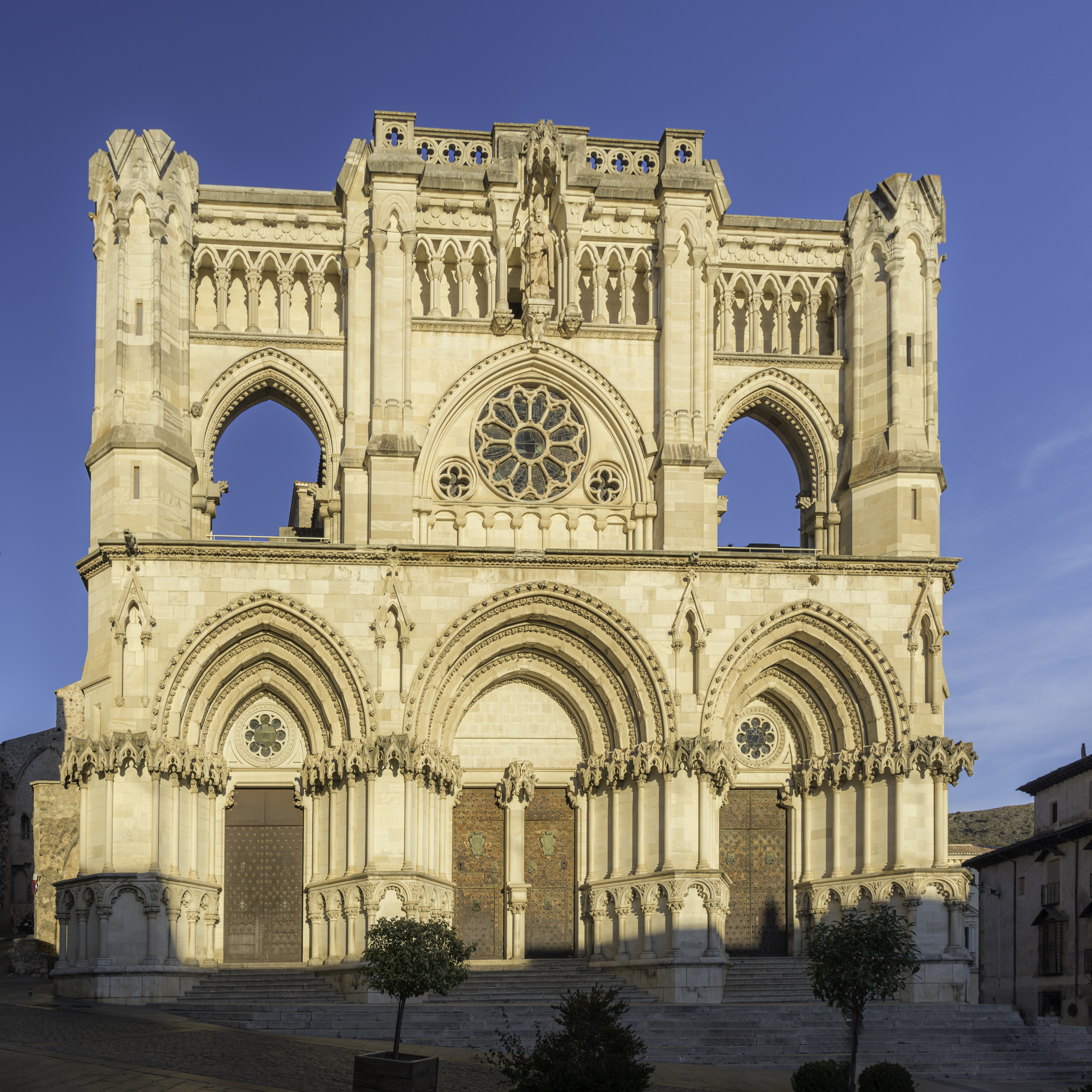
- The Gothic Revival façade in 2020
- Cuenca Cathedral
- 40.07849°N 2.12901°W
- Location: Cuenca
- Address: Plaza Mayor
- Country: Spain
- Denomination: Catholic
- Website: catedralcuenca.es

History
- Status: Cathedral
- Dedication: Julian of Cuenca and Mary, mother of Jesus
- Dedicated: 1196 and 1208

Architecture
- Style: Gothic, Romanesque, Gothic Revival
- Groundbreaking: 1182

Administration
- Metropolis: Toledo
- Diocese: Cuenca

Clergy
- Bishop: José María Yanguas Sanz

UNESCO World Heritage Site
- Criteria: Cultural:
- Designated: 1996 (20th session)
- Part of: Historic Walled Town of Cuenca
- Reference no.: 781

Spanish Cultural Heritage
- Type: Non-movable
- Criteria: Monument
- Designated: 23 August 1902
- Reference no.: RI-51-0000081

The Cathedral of Saint Mary and Saint Julian is a Roman Catholic cathedral in the city of Cuenca, Spain. The building is one of the earliest Spanish examples of Gothic architecture, built at a time when the Romanesque style still predominated in the Iberian Peninsula. In particular, the cathedral is characteristic of the Norman and Anglo-Norman architecture of the 12th century, of which Soissons Cathedral, Laon Cathedral and Notre-Dame de Paris are representative examples.

Work began in 1182 and was largely completed by 1257, although further renovations continued. In the 15th century, the Gothic chevet of the cathedral was reconstructed. The exterior was almost renovated in the 16th century. In the 17th century, the tabernacle chapel (capilla del Sagrario) was built, and the facade and the towers were reformed. The facade was partially reconstructed in the neo-Gothic style in 1910 to repair damage caused when the bell tower (the Giraldo) collapsed in 1902 after being struck by a lightning. However, there are plans and projects to complete the work once a technical consensus is reached.

The cathedral is the seat of the Roman Catholic Diocese of Cuenca. It is dedicated to Mary and to Saint Julian of Cuenca, the second bishop of the Diocese and patron saint of the city.

== History ==
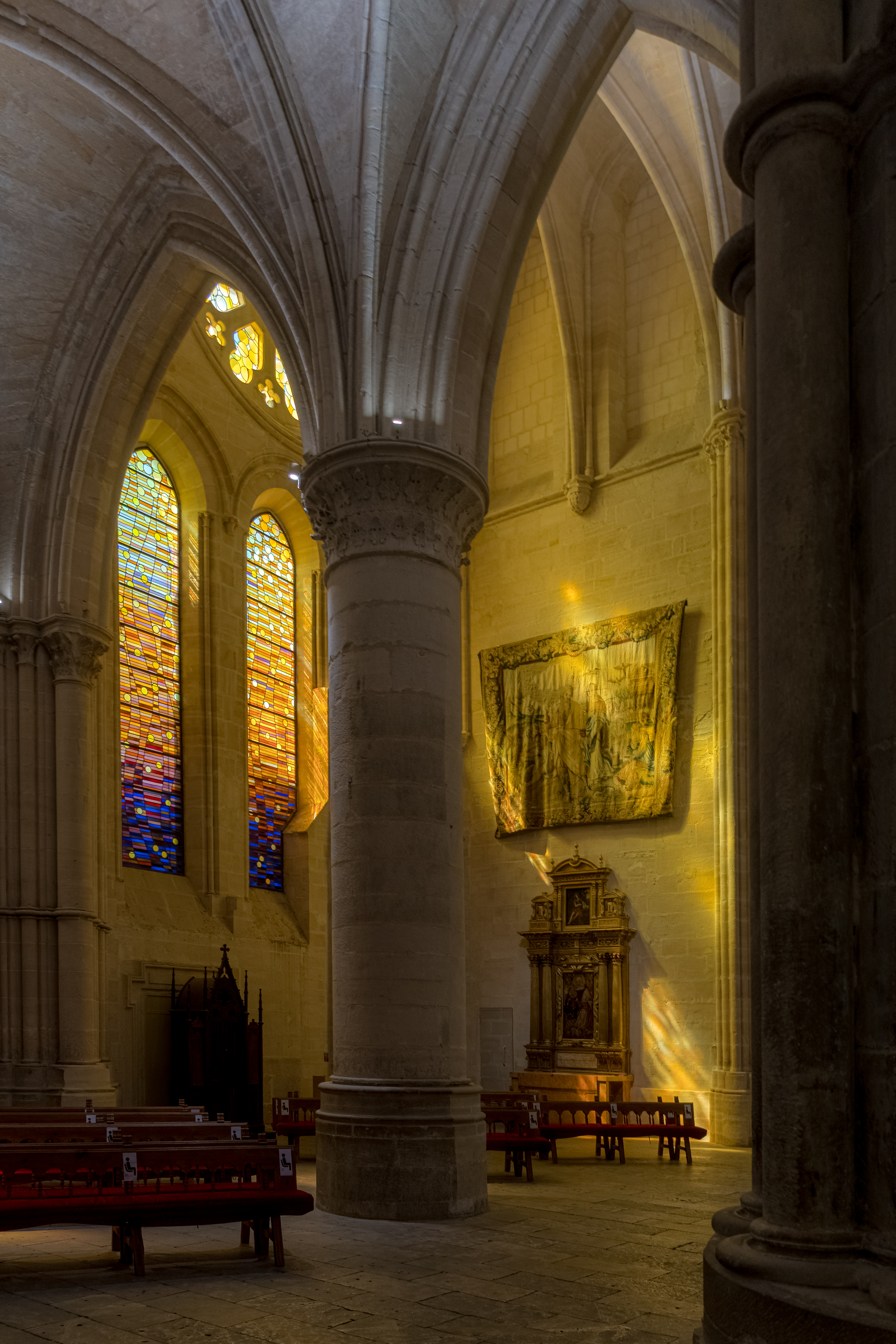
Abstract stained glass windows, completed in 1995

On 21 September 1177, Alfonso VIII of Castile, "The Noble", defeated the Moors after a nine-month siege and conquered the city of Cuenca. The city was made a diocese in 1183, and work began to build the cathedral on the foundations of the main Muslim mosque.

Like several other cathedrals built in Castile in the same period, Cuenca Cathedral is said to have been inspired by Eleanor Plantagenet of England, wife of King Alfonso VIII and daughter of Henry II of England and Eleanor of Aquitaine. Eleanor's Norman influence left its mark on the building, one of the earliest Gothic cathedrals of Castile along with the cathedral in Avila.

French stonemasons began work between 1182 and 1189, with work continuing in the 13th century. The cathedral was consecrated in 1196 by Saint Julian of Cuenca, second bishop of Cuenca, when only the chevet had been built. The high altar was consecrated in 1208 by Bishop Rodrigo Ximénez de Rada.

On 13 April 1902, the Giraldo tower (seen to the left of the façade in early photographs) collapsed after a direct lightning strike which also destroyed much of the façade. Several children were killed. Initial restoration of the façade was done in the neo-Gothic style. There are plans to restore the destroyed sections.

== Characteristics ==
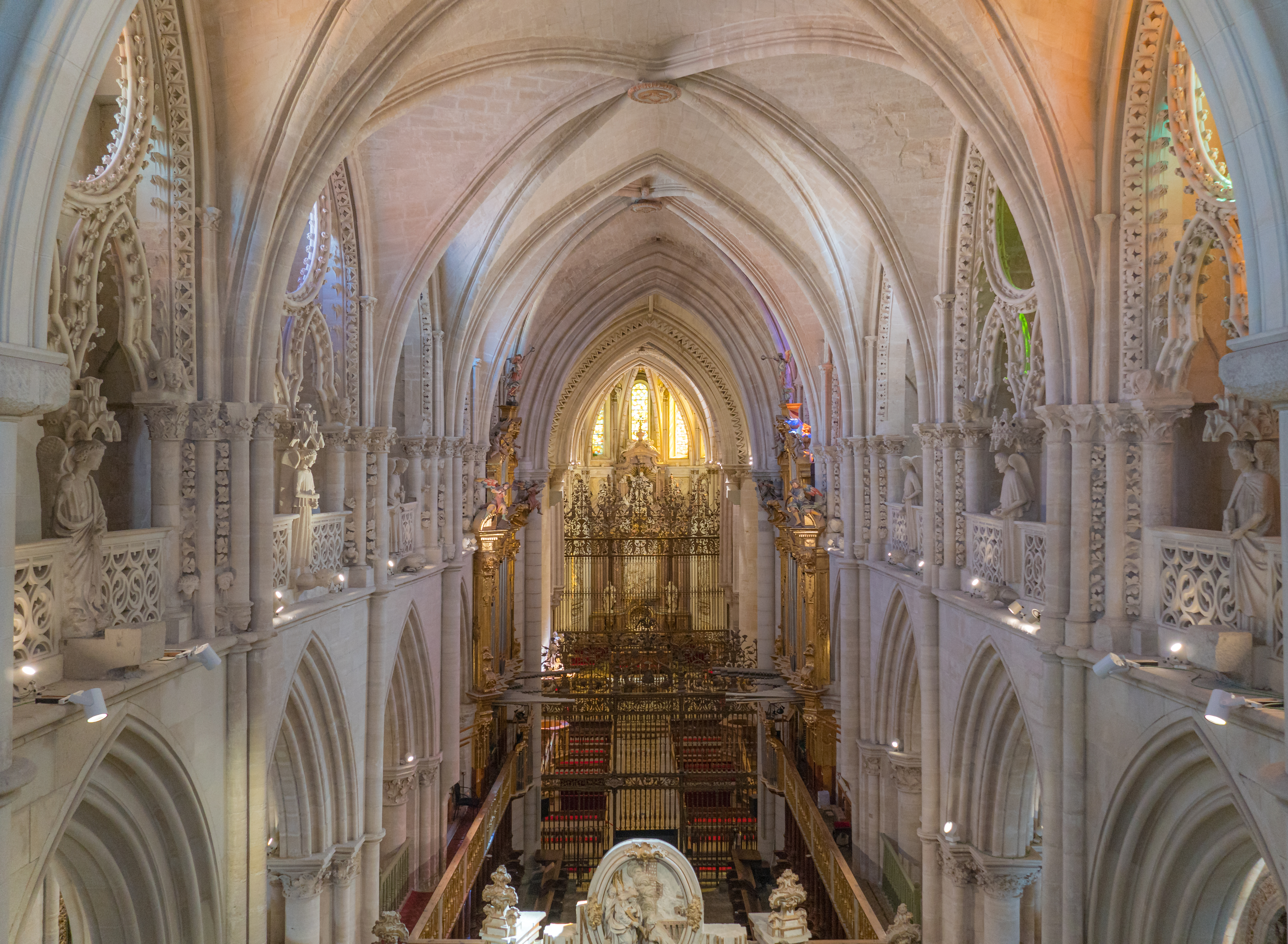
Central nave as seen from the triforium

Romanesque features of the cathedral date from its origins in the late Romanesque period. Characteristic of the Romanesque style, there were initially five staggered apses, a single transept and three naves in the main body of the building.

Thirteenth-century developments include the clerestory, with moulded windows, statues of angels and an oculus. The Anglo-Norman architectural influence can be seen, among other places, in the cathedral's sexpartite rib vaulting. The temple is of great dimensions, has a length of 120 meters and 36 meters of height, in its internal central area, occupying an area of 10,000 square meters. In the 15th century, the eastern end was rebuilt to create a double ambulatory. In the 17th century, the cathedral chapter retained architect Ventura Rodríguez to build the altar of Saint Julian, also known as el Transparente for the stained glass illuminating and decorating the background of the altarpiece. It rivalled altarpieces with similar features by Narciso Tomé in Toledo Cathedral. A new altar was built in the eighteenth century, with altarpiece statues by Italian sculptor Pasquale Bocciardo.

The collapse of Giraldo tower in 1902 caused widespread damage to the cathedral. The reconstruction of the facade by architect Vicente Lampérez, completed in 1910, partially repaired the damage. Most recently, the 16th-century cloister has been fully restored.

== Iconography ==
The iconography of Cuenca Cathedral is largely fantastical, with mythological and human figures interspersed amongst plant leaves, stems, fruits and meandering streams. Cuenca Cathedral is distinguished from many other cathedrals by sculptures representing animals unknown to the West, such as the armadillo, puffer fish or turtle, in its Gothic arches dating from the late 15th century, a period in the history of its construction that coincided with the European colonization of the Americas after 1492.

From readings of the Book of Revelation and the "Centuries" in Les Propheties by Nostradamus, the scholar and architect Rodrigo de Luz concluded that the Holy Grail was saved and preserved in this cathedral. As a consequence, Cuenca Cathedral and all those who take refuge within it would be spared in the final revelation. He identifies the cathedral with the description of the New Jerusalem of the Book of Revelation, on the strength of its 12 gates in shape of bows, each with 12 angels. Each stone angel has a sombre expression and holds a book with the exception of one, who is smiling and holding a goblet. This is interpreted as a hidden reference to the legend of the Holy Grail.

It has been claimed that there are other hidden messages in the iconography of the cathedral and of the City of Cuenca, including a coat of arms featuring a cup with an octagram or eight-pointed star, symbol of the Knights Templar.

== Gallery ==
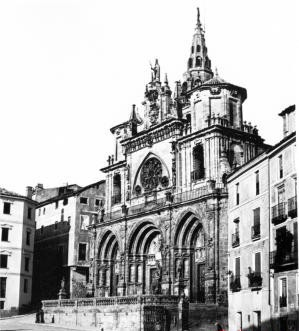
West façade before the 1902 damage

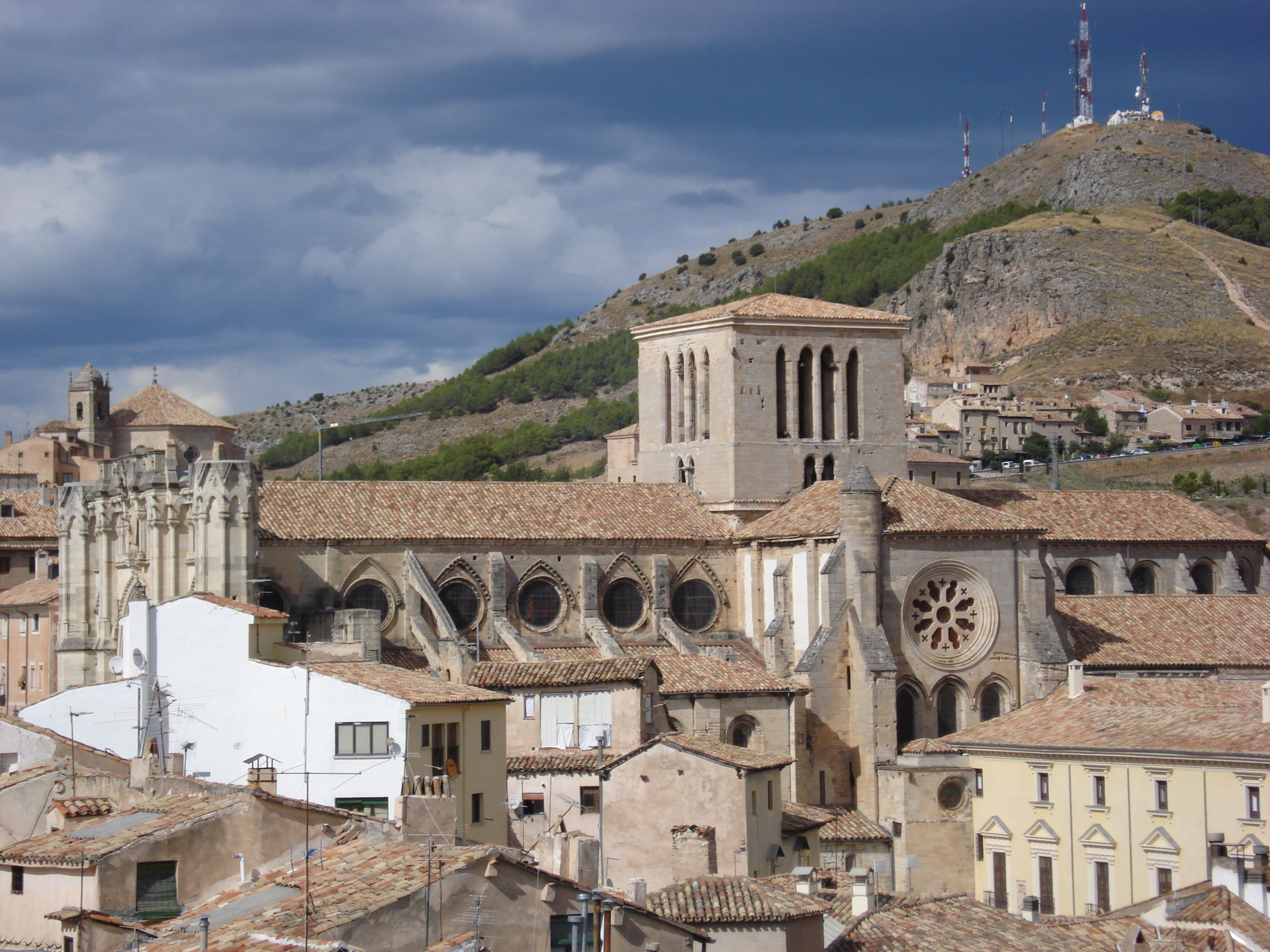
Lateral view

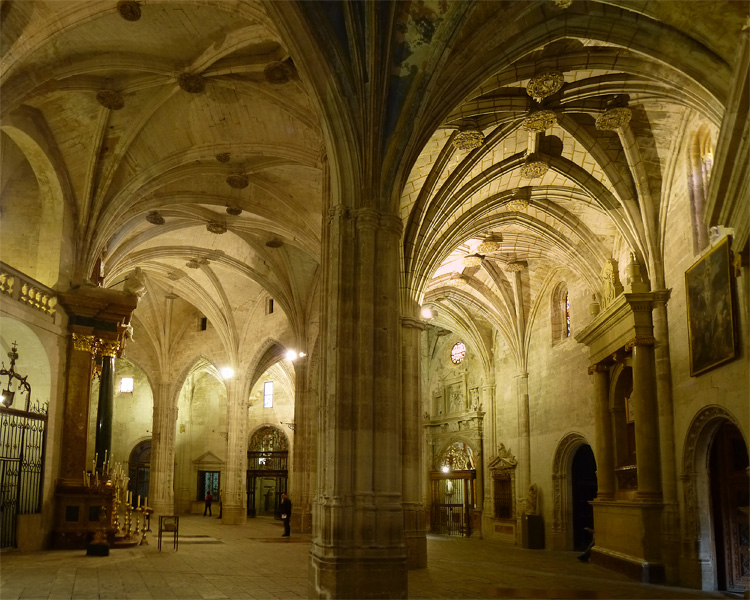
The seven-sided polygonal ambulatory

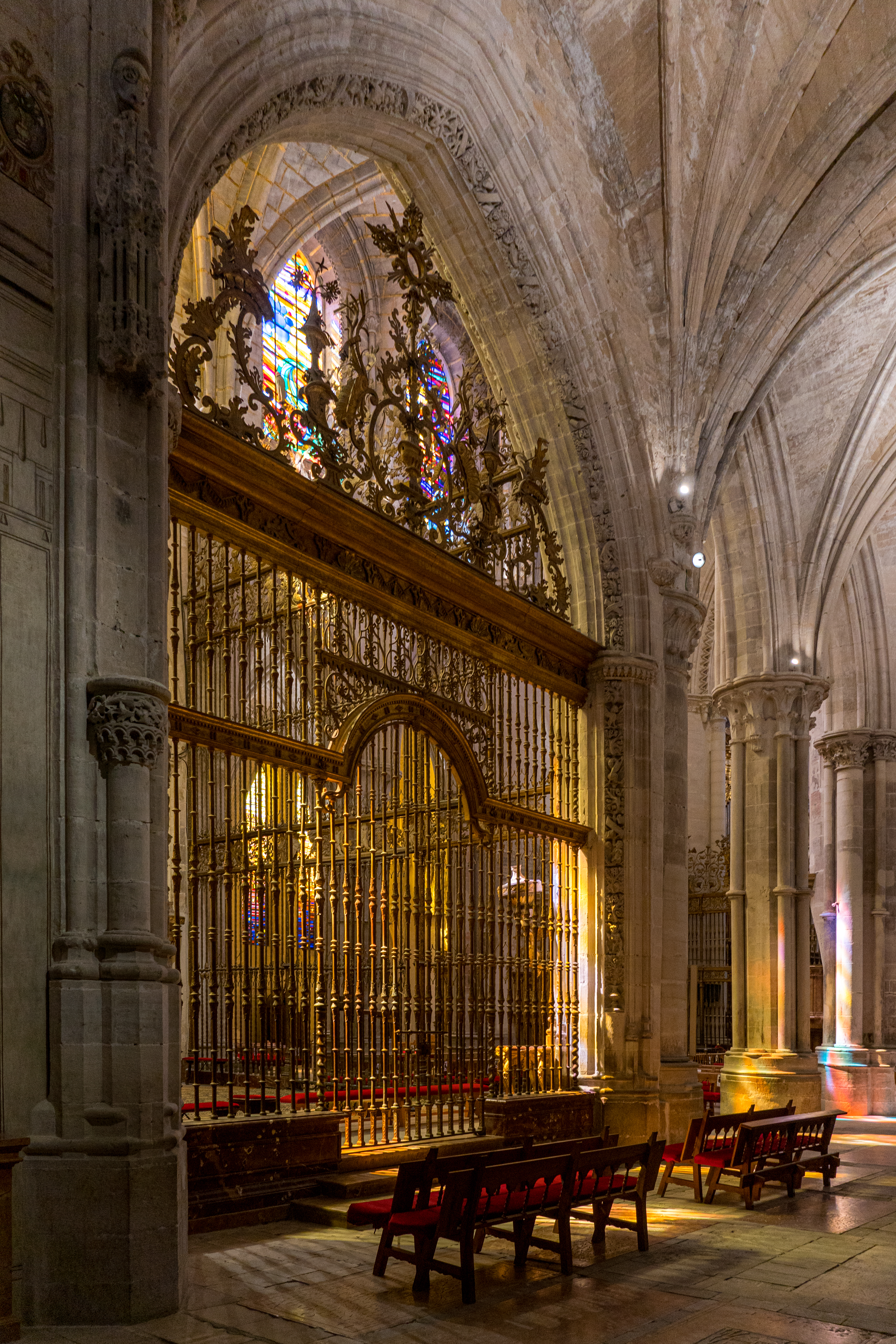
Ambulatory

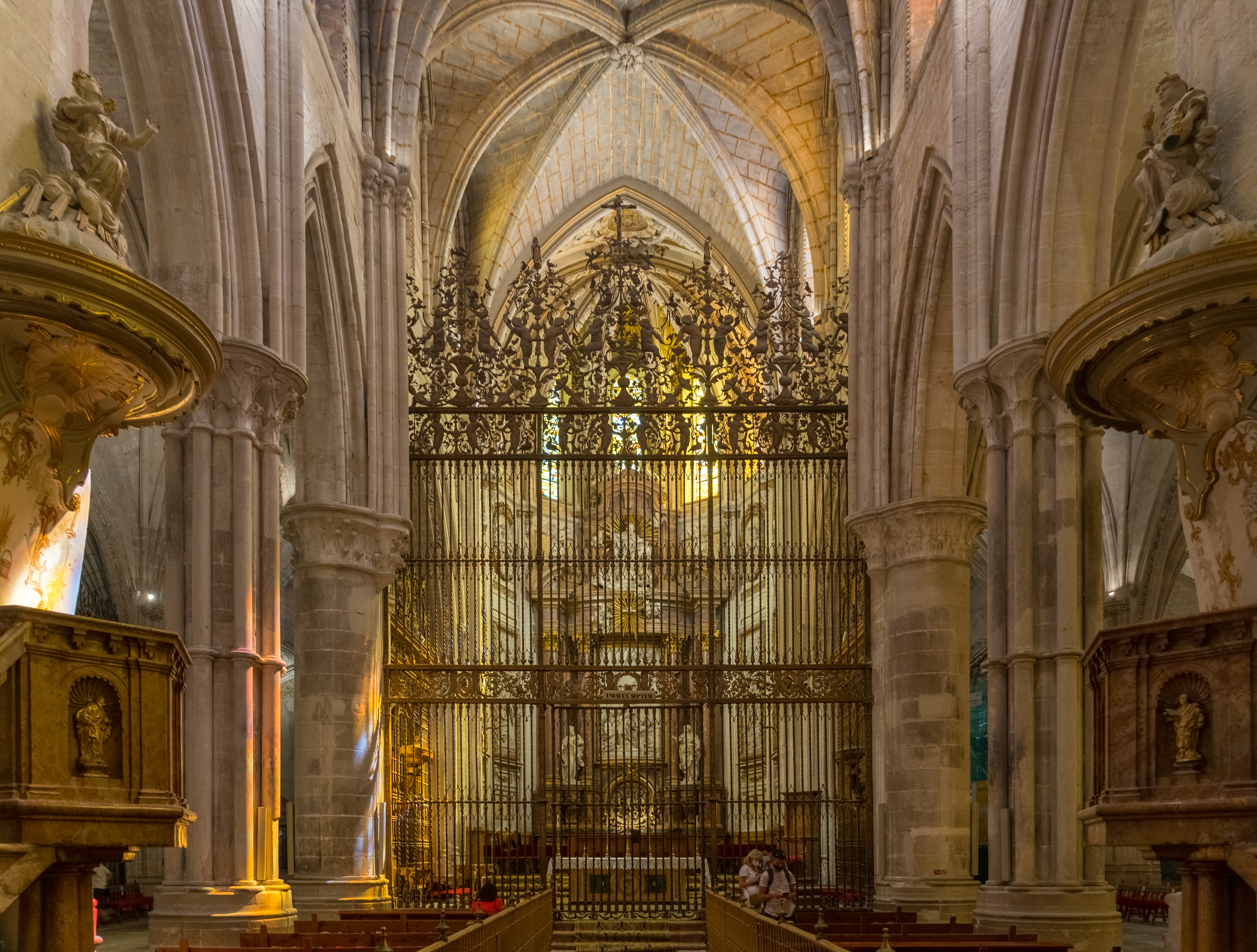
Main Altar

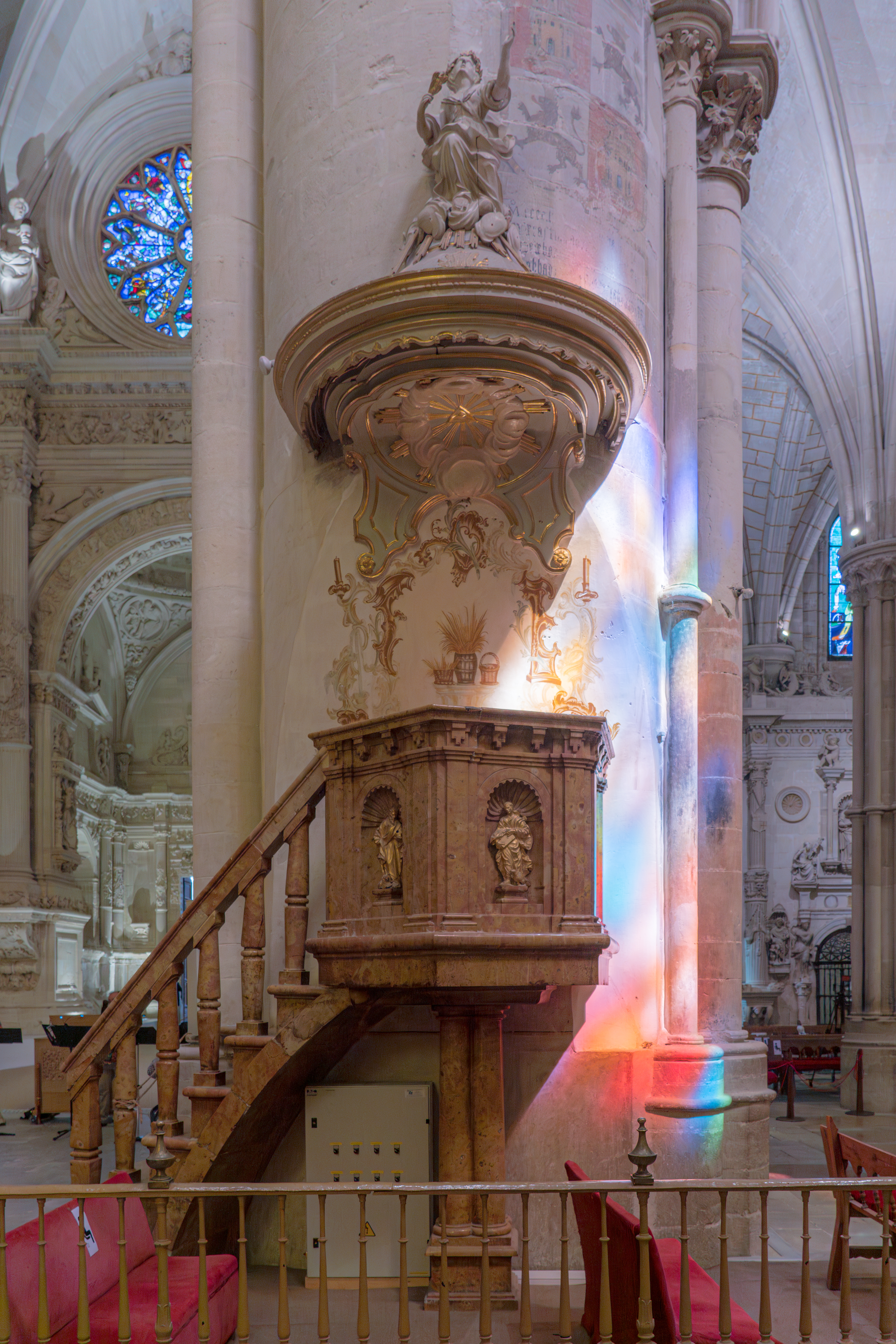
Pulpit, with the colourful lighting from the stained glass
