= Juan del Campo (bishop) =

Roman Catholic Bishop of León

Most Reverend Juan del Campo
- Bishop of León
- Church: Catholic Church
- Diocese: Diocese of León
- In office: 1332–1334

Orders
- Consecration: 27 Sep 1327 by Bertrand de La Tour

Personal details
- Died: 24 May 1344 León, Spain

Juan del Campo (died 1344) was a Roman Catholic prelate who served as Bishop of León (1332–1334), Bishop of Oviedo (1328–1332), and Bishop of Cuenca (1327–1328).

== Biography ==
On 8 Aug 1327, he was appointed during the papacy of Pope John XXII as Bishop of Cuenca. On 27 Sep 1327, he was consecrated bishop by Bertrand de La Tour, Cardinal-Bishop of Frascati. On 7 May 1328, he was appointed during the papacy of Pope John XXII as Bishop of Oviedo. On 2 Dec 1332, he was appointed during the papacy of Pope John XXII as Bishop of León. He served as Bishop of León until his death on 24 May 1344.

== External links and additional sources ==
- Cheney, David M. "Diocese of Cuenca". Catholic-Hierarchy.org. (for Chronology of Bishops) ^{[self-published]}
- Chow, Gabriel. "Diocese of Cuenca (Spain)". GCatholic.org. (for Chronology of Bishops) ^{[self-published]}
- Cheney, David M. "Diocese of León". Catholic-Hierarchy.org. (for Chronology of Bishops) ^{[self-published]}
- Chow, Gabriel. "Diocese of León". GCatholic.org. (for Chronology of Bishops) ^{[self-published]}

Catholic Church titles
Preceded by Fernando Gutiérrez (bishop)	Bishop of Cuenca; 1327–1328	Succeeded by
Preceded by	Bishop of Oviedo; 1328–1332	Succeeded by
Preceded by	Bishop of León; 1332–1334	Succeeded by
