= Giacopo Antonio Venier =

Italian Roman Catholic bishop and cardinal

- Cardinal-Priest of San Clemente
- Church: Catholic Church
- In office: 1476–1479
- Predecessor: Bartolomeo Roverella
- Successor: Domenico della Rovere
- Previous posts: Cardinal-Priest of Santi Vito, Modesto e Crescenzia (1473–1476); Bishop of Cuenca (1469–1479); Bishop of León (1464–1469); Bishop of Siracusa (1462–1464)

Orders
- Consecration: 22 December 1465 by Guillaume Cardinal d'Estouteville
- Created cardinal: 17 May 1473
- Rank: Cardinal Priest

Personal details
- Born: 1422 Recanati, Italy
- Died: 3 August 1479 (age 57) Cuenca, Spain

Giacopo Antonio Venier (1422–1479) (called the Cardinal of Cuenca) was an Italian Roman Catholic bishop and cardinal.

== Biography ==
Giacopo Antonio Venier was born in Recanati in 1422. After obtaining a doctorate in law, he moved to Rome to become a papal scriptor. He later became a cleric in the Apostolic Camera.

On 15 September 1460 Alfonso V of Aragon named him Bishop of Siracusa. Pope Pius II confirmed this appointment on 9 January 1462. On 16 September 1464 he was transferred to the see of León, with Venier taking possession of the bishopric on 7 October. He was consecrated as a bishop on 22 December 1465 in the church of Sant'Apollinare alle Terme Neroniane-Alessandrine in Rome by Cardinal Guillaume d'Estouteville, Archbishop of Rouen. Pope Paul II named Venier nuncio to Henry IV of Castile, who resent Venier to Rome as his ambassador. In 1460, he became the pope's nuncio to Francesco I Sforza in Milan. He was transferred to the see of Cuenca on 6 October 1469, taking possession of the see on 7 August 1470. He occupied this see until his death.

In the consistory of 7 May 1473, Pope Sixtus IV made Venier a cardinal priest. On 10 May 1473 he received the red hat in the Basilica di Santa Maria Maggiore, and on 17 May he received the titulus of Santi Vito, Modesto e Crescenzia (a deaconry raised pro illa vice to titulus). He opted for the titular church of the Basilica di San Clemente on 3 December 1476.

He died in Recanati on 3 August 1479. He was transferred to Rome and buried in the Basilica di San Clemente on 12 August 1479.

While bishop, he was the principal consecrator of Alfonso de Fonseca, Bishop of Ávila (1470).

Catholic Church titles
Preceded by Pablo de Santafé	Bishop of Siracusa; 1462–1464	Succeeded by Andrea Tolomei
Preceded by Juan de Torquemada (cardinal)	Bishop of León; 1464–1469	Succeeded by Rodrigo de Vergara
Preceded by Lope de Barrientos	Bishop of Cuenca; 1469–1479	Succeeded by Raffaele Sansone Riario
Preceded by Rinaldo Brancaccio	Cardinal-Priest of Santi Vito, Modesto e Crescenzia; 1473–1476	Succeeded by Giovanni Battista Savelli
Preceded by Bartolomeo Roverella	Cardinal-Priest of San Clemente; 1476–1479	Succeeded by Domenico della Rovere
