= Rodrigo Cruzado Caballero =

Spanish Roman Catholic prelate

Most Reverend Rodrigo Cruzado Caballero
- Auxiliary Bishop of Cuenca; Titular Bishop of Usula
- Church: Catholic Church
- Diocese: Diocese of Cuenca
- In office: 1652–?

Orders
- Consecration: 21 January 1652 by Marcantonio Franciotti

Rodrigo Cruzado Caballero was a Roman Catholic prelate who served as Auxiliary Bishop of Cuenca (1652–?) and Titular Bishop of Usula (1652–?).

== Biography ==
On 8 January 1652, Rodrigo Cruzado Caballero was appointed during the papacy of Pope Innocent X as Auxiliary Bishop of Cuenca and Titular Bishop of Usula. On 21 January 1652, he was consecrated bishop by Marcantonio Franciotti, Cardinal-Priest of Santa Maria della Pace, with Ranuccio Scotti Douglas, Bishop Emeritus of Borgo San Donnino, and Patrizio Donati, Bishop Emeritus of Minori, serving as co-consecrators. It is uncertain how long he served.

Catholic Church titles
Preceded by	Auxiliary Bishop of Cuenca; 1652–?	Succeeded by
Preceded by	Titular Bishop of Usula; 1652–?	Succeeded by
