= Alonso Antonio de San Martín =

Catholic Bishop and bastard son of King Felipe IV of Spain

Most Reverend Alonso Antonio de San Martín
- Bishop of Cuenca
- Church: Catholic Church
- Diocese: Diocese of Cuenca
- In office: 1676–1705
- Predecessor: Francisco de Zárate y Terán
- Successor: Miguel del Olmo Manrique

Orders
- Consecration: April 1676 by Francisco de Rois y Mendoza

Personal details
- Born: 12 December 1642 Madrid, Spain
- Died: 5 July 1705 (age 63) Cuenca, Spain

Alonso Antonio de San Martín (12 December 1642 – 5 July 1705) was a Catholic prelate who served as Bishop of Cuenca (1681–1705) and Bishop of Oviedo (1675–1681). He was an illegitimate son of King Felipe IV of Spain.

== Biography ==
Alonso Antonio de San Martín was born in Madrid, Spain on 12 December 1642. He was the illegitimate son of King Felipe IV of Spain and of a young woman who served in the Buen Retiro Palace, named Tomasa María de Aldana, a native of Illescas, Toledo. However, in the newborn's baptismal certificate, which took place in the parish of San Sebastián, are assigned as biological parents: Juan de Valdés and María Díaz.

On 1 October 1675, he was selected by the King of Spain and confirmed by Pope Clement X on 16 December 1675 as Bishop of Oviedo. In April 1676, he was consecrated bishop by Francisco de Rois y Mendoza, Archbishop of Granada, with Clemente Alvarez López, Bishop of Guadix, and Melchior de Escuda Aybar, Titular Bishop of Utica, serving as co-consecrators. On 21 October 1681, he was appointed during the papacy of Pope Innocent XI as Bishop of Cuenca. He served as Bishop of Cuenca until his death on 5 July 1705.

== External links and additional sources ==
- Cheney, David M. "Metropolitan Archdiocese of Oviedo". Catholic-Hierarchy.org. (for Chronology of Bishops) ^{[self-published]}
- Chow, Gabriel. "Archdiocese of Oviedo (Spain)". GCatholic.org. (for Chronology of Bishops) ^{[self-published]}
- Cheney, David M. "Diocese of Cuenca". Catholic-Hierarchy.org. (for Chronology of Bishops) ^{[self-published]}
- Chow, Gabriel. "Diocese of Cuenca (Spain)". GCatholic.org. (for Chronology of Bishops) ^{[self-published]}

Catholic Church titles
Preceded by Alfonso de Salizanes y Medina	Bishop of Oviedo; 1675–1681	Succeeded by Simón García Pedrejón
Preceded by Francisco de Zárate y Terán	Bishop of Cuenca; 1681–1705	Succeeded by Miguel del Olmo Manrique
