= Alfonso de Fonseca =

Roman Catholic prelate

Most Reverend Alfonso de Fonseca
- Bishop of Osma
- Church: Catholic Church
- Diocese: Diocese of Osma
- In office: 1493–1505
- Predecessor: Raffaele Sansone Riario
- Successor: Alfonso Enríquez
- Previous posts: Bishop of Ávila (1469–1485); Bishop of Cuenca (1485–1493)

Orders
- Consecration: 25 February 1470 by Giacopo Antonio Venier

Personal details
- Born: 1422 Toro, Zamora
- Died: 1505 (aged 82–83) Seville

Alfonso de Fonseca (1422–1505) was a Roman Catholic prelate who served as Bishop of Osma (1493–1505), Bishop of Cuenca (1485–1493), and Bishop of Ávila (1469–1485).

== Biography ==
Alfonso was the first son of Pedro de Ulloa y Fonesca and Isabel de Quijada.

On 29 January 1469, in recognition of his services to the Spanish crown, Alfonso was appointed by the King of Spain and confirmed by Pope Paul II as Bishop of Ávila. On 25 February 1470, he was ordained bishop by Giacopo Antonio Venier, Bishop of Cuenca; Giovanni Gianderoni, Bishop of Città di Castello; and Corrado Marcellini, Bishop of Montefeltro. On 26 August 1485, he was appointed by Pope Innocent VIII as Bishop of Cuenca. On 24 May 1493, he was appointed by Pope Alexander VI as Bishop of Osma, where he served until his death in 1505.

== External links and additional sources ==
- Cheney, David M. "Diocese of Ávila". Catholic-Hierarchy.org. (for Chronology of Bishops) ^{[self-published]}
- Chow, Gabriel. "Diocese of Ávila". GCatholic.org. (for Chronology of Bishops) ^{[self-published]}
- Cheney, David M. "Diocese of Cuenca". Catholic-Hierarchy.org. (for Chronology of Bishops) ^{[self-published]}
- Chow, Gabriel. "Diocese of Cuenca (Spain)". GCatholic.org. (for Chronology of Bishops) ^{[self-published]}
- Cheney, David M. "Diocese of Osma-Soria". Catholic-Hierarchy.org. (for Chronology of Bishops) ^{[self-published]}
- Chow, Gabriel. "Diocese of Osma-Soria (Italy)". GCatholic.org. (for Chronology of Bishops) ^{[self-published]}

Catholic Church titles
Preceded by Martín Fernández de Vilches	Bishop of Ávila; 1469–1485	Succeeded by Hernando de Talavera
Preceded by Alfonso de Burgos	Bishop of Cuenca; 1485–1493	Succeeded by Raffaele Sansone Riario
Preceded by Raffaele Sansone Riario	Bishop of Osma; 1493–1505	Succeeded by Alfonso Enríquez
