= Enrique Pimentel Zúñiga =

Spanish Roman Catholic prelate

Most Reverend Enrique Pimentel Zúñiga
- Bishop of Cuenca
- Church: Catholic Church
- Diocese: Diocese of Cuenca
- In office: 1623–1653
- Predecessor: Andrés Pacheco
- Successor: Juan Francisco Pacheco
- Previous post: Bishop of Valladolid (1619–1623)

Orders
- Ordination: 29 Jul 1619
- Consecration: 8 Dec 1619 by Fernando Acevedo González

Personal details
- Born: 5 Aug 1574 Benavides de Orvigo, Spain
- Died: 11 Jun 1653 (age 78) Cuenca, Spain

Enrique Pimentel Zúñiga (1574–1653) was a Roman Catholic prelate who served as Bishop of Cuenca (1623–1653) and Bishop of Valladolid (1619–1623).

== Early life ==
Enrique Pimentel Zúñiga was born in Benavides de Orvigo, Spain on 5 Aug 1574 (or 3 Aug 1576), as illegitimate son of Juan Alonso Pimentel de Herrera, 5th Duke of Benavente and María Gallega.

== Career ==
He was ordained a priest on 29 July 1619. On 29 July 1619, he was appointed during the papacy of Pope Paul V as Bishop of Valladolid.

On 8 December 1619, he was consecrated bishop by Fernando Acevedo González, Archbishop of Burgos, with Juan Portocarrero, Bishop of Almería, serving as co-consecrator.

On 13 February 1623, he was appointed during the papacy of Pope Gregory XV as Bishop of Cuenca. He served as Bishop of Cuenca until his death on 11 June 1653.

He was also President of the Council of Aragon between 1628 and 1632.

== Episcopal succession ==
While bishop, he was the principal consecrator of:

- Garcerán Albañell, Archbishop of Granada (1621);
- Juan de la Torre Ayala, Archbishop of Granada (1622);
- Juan Pereda Gudiel, Bishop of Oviedo (1627); and
- Domingo Pimentel Zúñiga, Bishop of Osma (1631).

== See also ==
- Catholic Church in Spain

== External links and additional sources ==
- Cheney, David M. "Diocese of Cuenca". Catholic-Hierarchy.org. (for Chronology of Bishops) ^{[self-published]}
- Chow, Gabriel. "Diocese of Cuenca (Spain)". GCatholic.org. (for Chronology of Bishops) ^{[self-published]}

Catholic Church titles
Preceded by Juan Fernández Valdivieso	Bishop of Valladolid; 1619–1623	Succeeded by Alfonso López Gallo
Preceded by Andrés Pacheco	Bishop of Cuenca; 1623–1653	Succeeded by Juan Francisco Pacheco
