= Francisco de Zárate y Terán =

Spanish Roman Catholic prelate

Most Reverend Francisco de Zárate y Terán
- Bishop of Cuenca
- Church: Catholic Church
- Diocese: Diocese of Cuenca
- In office: 1664–1679
- Predecessor: Juan Francisco Pacheco
- Successor: Alonso Antonio de San Martín
- Previous post: Bishop of Segovia (1661–1663)

Orders
- Consecration: 29 June 1661 by Juan Merino López

Personal details
- Born: 1610 Madrid, Spain
- Died: 21 December 1679 (aged 68–69) Cuenca, Spain

Francisco de Zárate y Terán (1610 – 21 December 1679) was a Roman Catholic prelate who served as Bishop of Cuenca (1664–1679) and Bishop of Segovia (1661–1664).

== Biography ==
Francisco de Zárate y Terán was born in Madrid, Spain in 1610. On 26 October 1660 he was selected by the King of Spain and confirmed by Pope Alexander VII on 21 February 1661 as Bishop of Segovia. On 29 June 1661, he was consecrated bishop by Juan Merino López, Bishop of Valladolid, with Martín de Bonilla Granada, Bishop of Ávila, and Francisco Antonio Díaz de Cabrera, Bishop of Salamanca, serving as co-consecrators. On 23 October 1663, he was selected by the King of Spain and confirmed by Pope Alexander VII on 28 January 1664 as Bishop of Cuenca. He served as Bishop of Cuenca until his death on 21 December 1679.

== External links and additional sources ==
- Cheney, David M. "Diocese of Segovia". Catholic-Hierarchy.org. (for Chronology of Bishops) ^{[self-published]}
- Chow, Gabriel. "Diocese of Segovia (Spain)". GCatholic.org. (for Chronology of Bishops) ^{[self-published]}
- Cheney, David M. "Diocese of Cuenca". Catholic-Hierarchy.org. (for Chronology of Bishops) ^{[self-published]}
- Chow, Gabriel. "Diocese of Cuenca (Spain)". GCatholic.org. (for Chronology of Bishops) ^{[self-published]}

Catholic Church titles
Preceded by Juan del Pozo Horta	Bishop of Segovia; 1661–1664	Succeeded by Diego Escolano y Ledesma
Preceded by Juan Francisco Pacheco	Bishop of Cuenca; 1664–1679	Succeeded by Alonso Antonio de San Martín
