= Alonso Tostado =

Spanish theologian and bishop

Most Reverend Alonso Fernández de Madrigal
- Bishop of Ávila
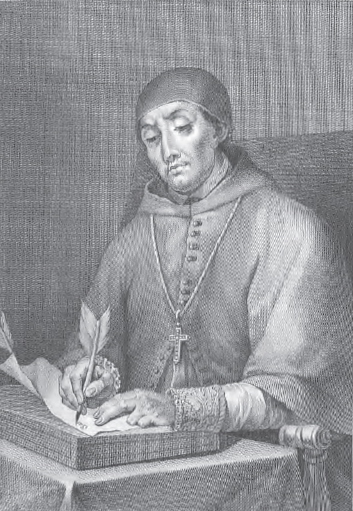
- Alonso Tostado
- Church: Catholic Church
- Diocese: Diocese of Ávila
- In office: 1454–1455
- Predecessor: Alonso de Fonseca y Ulloa
- Successor: Martín Fernández de Vilches

Personal details
- Born: c. 1410
- Died: 3 September 1455

Alonso Tostado (also Al(f)onso Fernández de Madrigal, variously known as Alphonsus Tostatus, Tostatus Abulensis, and in Spanish as El Tostado or El Abulense; c. 1410 – 3 September 1455) was a Spanish theologian, councillor of John II of Castile and briefly bishop of Ávila. His epitaph stated "Wonder of earth, all [that] men can know he scanned."

A leading scholar of his generation, he is particularly known for providing the first indication of the end of the pre-critical era of biblical studies, allowing us to foresee the beginning of textual criticism. In his Comentaria in Deuteronomium, III/2 (Köln, 1613) pp. 317-319, he asks: An Moyses potuerit scribere prophetice in verbis suis ista quae habentur hic vel scripserit literam istam Esdras et Josue (Could Moses have written these things prophetically in his own words? Ezra and Joshua are said to have written this text). A few centuries later, the question of whether the Pentateuch was entirely the work of Moses or of other authors would become a central topic of discussion among Pentateuch scholars. He is also known as an early theorist on witchcraft; in his De maleficis mulieribus, quae vulgariter dicuntur bruxas (1440) he defended the possibility of flying witches based on biblical exegesis.

== Life ==
Alonso's father, also called Alonso Tostado, was a ploughman. The nickname Tostado refers to a ploughman's tanned or sunburnt complexion. After a course of grammar under the Franciscans he entered the University of Salamanca, where, besides philosophy and theology, he studied civil and canon law, Greek, Hebrew, and the other branches then comprised in the curriculum of a university. By great application joined to an unusually brilliant mind and an extraordinarily retentive memory, he accumulated such a vast store of knowledge that his contemporaries styled him a wonder of the world. At 22 he began to lecture on a wide variety of subjects to large audiences attracted by his learning.

Later he assisted with distinction at the Council of Basle. During a visit to the papal court at Siena in 1443, he was denounced to Pope Eugene IV as having publicly defended a heretic and some rash propositions, but in an explanatory letter he assured the pontiff of his orthodoxy. On his return to Spain, he entered briefly the Carthusian monastery of Scala Dei in January 1444 but was appointed Grand Chancellor and councillor of John II of Castile just three months later and moved to the court. In 1454, shortly before his premature death (likely in his forties or early fifties), he was named Bishop of Ávila. His sepulcher in Avila was carved by Vasco de la Zarza in 1518.

== Works ==
In his Defensorium, written against Juan de Torquemada and other critics, he gave utterance to views derogatory to the authority of the pope. Besides a Spanish commentary on the chronicles of Eusebius and other minor works, he wrote commentaries on the historical books of the Old Testament as far as Second Chronicles, and on the Gospel according to St. Matthew. These are diffuse, containing many digressions on dogmatic and other subjects. Tostado's works exercised a significant influence on the Jewish Bible commentator and statesman Isaac Abravanel (1437–1508).

An edition of his works in 13 folio volumes was published at Venice in 1507 and 1547; a more complete edition in 24 folio volumes appeared at the same place in 1615, and another in 27 folio volumes in 1728.

Catholic Church titles
| Preceded by Alonso de Fonseca y Ulloa | Bishop of Ávila; 1454–1455 | Succeeded by Martín Fernández de Vilches |
