= Juan del Pozo Horta =

Spanish Roman Catholic prelate (1584–1660)

Most Reverend Juan del Pozo Horta
- Bishop of Segovia
- Church: Catholic Church
- Diocese: Diocese of Segovia
- In office: 1656–1660
- Predecessor: Francisco Araújo
- Successor: Francisco de Zárate y Terán
- Previous posts: Bishop of Lugo (1646–1650); Bishop of León (1650–1656)

Orders
- Consecration: 14 October 1646 by Giulio Rospigliosi

Personal details
- Born: 13 December 1584 Valladolid, Spain
- Died: 16 August 1660 (age 75) Segovia, Spain

Juan del Pozo Horta (13 December 1584 – 16 August 1660) was a Roman Catholic prelate who served as Bishop of Segovia (1656–1660), Bishop of León (1650–1656), and Bishop of Lugo (1646–1650).

== Biography ==
Juan del Pozo Horta was born in Valladolid and ordained a priest in the Order of Preachers. On 16 July 1646, he was appointed during the papacy of Pope Innocent X as Bishop of Lugo. On 14 October 1646, he was consecrated bishop by Giulio Rospigliosi, Titular Archbishop of Tarsus, with Miguel Avellán, Titular Bishop of Siriensis, and Timoteo Pérez Vargas, Titular Bishop of Lystra, serving as co-consecrators. On 10 January 1650, he was appointed during the papacy of Pope Innocent X as Bishop of León. On 1 April 1656, he was selected by the King of Spain and confirmed by Pope Alexander VII on 28 August 1656 as Bishop of Segovia. He served as Bishop of Segovia until his death on 16 August 1660.

While bishop, he was the principal co-consecrator of Juan Pérez de Vega, Bishop of Tui (1649).

== External links and additional sources ==
- Cheney, David M. "Diocese of León". Catholic-Hierarchy.org. (for Chronology of Bishops) ^{[self-published]}
- Chow, Gabriel. "Diocese of León". GCatholic.org. (for Chronology of Bishops) ^{[self-published]}
- Cheney, David M. "Diocese of Segovia". Catholic-Hierarchy.org. (for Chronology of Bishops) ^{[self-published]}
- Chow, Gabriel. "Diocese of Segovia (Spain)". GCatholic.org. (for Chronology of Bishops) ^{[self-published]}
- Cheney, David M. "Diocese of Lugo". Catholic-Hierarchy.org. (for Chronology of Bishops) ^{[self-published]}
- Chow, Gabriel. "Diocese of Lugo (Spain)". GCatholic.org. (for Chronology of Bishops) ^{[self-published]}

Catholic Church titles
| Preceded by Juan Sánchez Alonso de Guevara | Bishop of Lugo; 1646–1650 | Succeeded by Francisco Torres Sánchez de Roa |
| Preceded by Bartolomé Santos de Risoba | Bishop of León; 1650–1656 | Succeeded by Juan Pérez de Vega |
| Preceded by Francisco Araújo | Bishop of Segovia; 1656–1660 | Succeeded by Francisco de Zárate y Terán |
