= Raffaele Riario =

Italian cardinal (1461–1521)

His Eminence Raffaele Sansone Riario
- Cardinal-Bishop of Ostia e Velletri
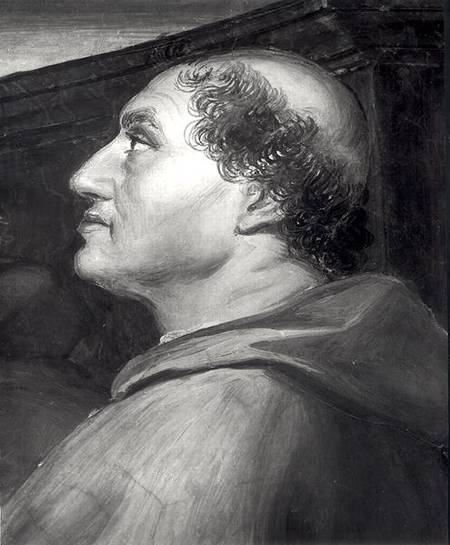
- Raffaele Riario; detail of Raphael's Mass at Bolsena (1512–1514), Stanza di Eliodoro, Apostolic Palace
- Church: Roman Catholic
- In office: 1511–1521

Orders
- Consecration: 9 April 1504 by Pope Julius II
- Created cardinal: 10 December 1477 by Pope Sixtus IV
- Rank: Cardinal-Bishop

Personal details
- Born: 3 May 1461 Savona, Republic of Genoa
- Died: 9 July 1521 (aged 60) Naples, Kingdom of Naples
- Buried: Basilica dei Santi Apostoli
- Denomination: Roman Catholic

Raffaele Sansoni Galeoti Riario (3 May 1461 – 9 July 1521) was an Italian cardinal of the Renaissance, mainly known as the constructor of the Palazzo della Cancelleria and the person who invited Michelangelo to Rome. He was a patron of the arts. He was also the first adolescent to be elevated in the College of Cardinals in the history of the Holy See.

== Early career and Pazzi Conspiracy ==
Born in poverty in Savona, Riario was the son of Antonio Sansoni and Violante Riario, a niece of Francesco della Rovere, who became Pope Sixtus IV in 1471.

Being the relative of Pope Sixtus IV, he was created Cardinal of San Giorgio in Velabro on 10 December 1477 and was named Administrator of several dioceses: (diocese of Cuenca, diocese of Pisa, diocese of Salamanca, diocese of Treguier, diocese of Osma). These gave him a handsome income, and no obligations except to appoint a vicar. He was then only sixteen years old and a student of canon law at the University of Pisa. He left Pisa because of the plague. While returning to Rome in the spring of 1478, Riario halted in Florence, where he became a witness to the Pazzi Conspiracy against the Medici. Despite his innocence, Raffaele was arrested by the Florentine authorities because he was a relation of the conspirators Girolamo Riario, his mother's brother and the head of the plot, and the Archbishop Francesco Salviati. His release a few weeks later was arranged by Lorenzo de' Medici. On 22 June 1478 he was received formally as a cardinal by the Pope in Siena and four days later he was sent as legate to Perugia.

It was not until 1480 that Raffaele was ordained priest and received the entitlement of San Lorenzo in Damaso. He was named Camerlengo in 1483.

== Riario in the Papal Court ==
In 1484, Riario was engaged in the war which broke out between the Orsini and the Colonna family, trying to secure in vain the life of his friend Lorenzo Oddone Colonna, who was charged of having murdered an Orsini and was executed by Sixtus IV. In 1488, Pope Innocent VIII sent Cardinal Riario as a legate to his maternal uncle Girolamo Riario, at the time governor of Forlì and Imola, who was revolting against the Holy See. Meanwhile, the Cardinal had already commissioned the erection of his palace beside the church of San Lorenzo in Damaso (1486).

It is said that Franceschetto Cybo, the infamous son of Innocent VIII, lost in one single night 15,000 ducats at a card game which took place in Raffaele's residence. When the Pope asked the Cardinal to return his son's money, the latter answered that he was sorry, but he had already used it to finance the construction of his palace.

As Camerlengo, Riario is usually praised for ensuring order in Rome after the death of Innocent VIII. He was a candidate for the papal tiara in the Conclave of 1492, but excluded from the first ballots due to his young age. He finally voted for Rodrigo Borgia (Pope Alexander VI), receiving the lucrative Bishopric of Cartagena as a reward for his support.

During Alexander VI’s reign (1492–1503), Riario gained distinction as diplomat and councillor of the papal throne. In 1493, he was sent as legate to Caterina Sforza, Girolamo Riario's widow, to prevent her from allowing the French troops to pass through Forlì and Imola. Pope Julius II (1503–1513), Riario's relative but not always his ally, raised him to the Bishopric of Ostia and Velletri.

== Engagement in the plot against Leo X and death ==
In June 1517, Cardinal Petrucci and others conspired against Pope Leo X (Giovanni dei Medici). Cardinal Riario refused to participate in the plot but was at least aware of Petrucci's intentions to murder the Pope and did nothing to prevent it. Leo was notified about the plot, arrested the conspirators and ordered their execution. Riario, whose entanglement in the Pazzi conspiracy had not been forgotten by the Medici Pope, secured his head only by surrendering his palace beside San Lorenzo in Damaso to the Pope. Leo transferred it to his cousin Giulio de' Medici, Vice-Chancellor of the Holy See, who rendered it the seat of the Apostolic Chancery. Thus the Palazzo Riario was henceforward known as Palazzo della Cancelleria.

Riario died in Naples, at the age of sixty. His tomb is located in the Basilica dei Santi Apostoli in Rome.

== Art patronage and reputation ==
A lover of fine arts and especially sculpture, Cardinal Riario's artistic choices foreshadow the arrival of High Renaissance in Rome. His gigantic residence, influenced by Florentine architecture, is the first building of the new monumental style which prevailed in the Holy City under Julius II. Riario is also credited for noticing the talent of the young Michelangelo. In 1496, the Sleeping Cupid was treacherously sold to him as an ancient piece: the aesthetic prelate discovered the cheat, but was so impressed by the quality of the sculpture that he invited the artist to Rome, where Michelangelo worked on the three major commissions of his career. For Riario, Michelangelo carved the Bacchus (1496-97), which is now in the Bargello Museum, Florence.

Raffaele Riario is generally considered a prelate typical of his era: indifferent in religious matters, rather a statesman than a priest, rather a Maecenas than a theologian.

== In popular culture ==
Raffaele Riario appears in seasons 2 and 3 of the 2016 Medici tv series. He is played by Francesco di Raimondo in season 2 and Loris De Luna in season 3. He is played by American actor Scott William Winters in all three seasons of the Borgia television series, which aired in 2011 to 2014. In this adaptation he is a close conspirator of his distant cousin Giuliano della Rovere against Rodrigo Borgia and others in the Borgia family, though his political skill and usefulness lets him rise to Vice Chancellor of the church under Alexander's reign.

Raffaele Riario is a major character in the manga Cesare: Creator of Destruction, which focuses on Cesare Borgia's year studying at the University of Pisa in the year before his father was elected as Pope Alexander VI. In the manga, Riario is the Archbishop of Pisa, and Cesare lives with him in his palace. In the 2023 stage musical adaptation, Riario was played by Haruki Kiyama.

Catholic Church titles
| Preceded by Giacopo Venier | Bishop of Cuenca; 1479–1482 | Succeeded by Alonso de Burgos |
| Preceded by Francesco Salviati | Archbishop of Pisa; 1493–1521 | Succeeded by Onofrio Bartolini de' Medici |
| Preceded by Christophe du Châtel | Bishop of Tréguier; 1480–1483 | Succeeded by Robert Guibé |
| Preceded by Gonzalo de Vivero | Bishop of Salamanca; 1482–1493 | Succeeded by Diego de Deza |
| Preceded by Pedro González de Mendoza | Bishop of Osma; 1483–1493 | Succeeded by Alfonso de Fonseca |
| Preceded by Alfonso de Fonseca | Bishop of Cuenca; 1493–1518 | Succeeded by Diego Ramírez de Fuenleal |
| Preceded by Matteo Cybo | Bishop of Viterbo; 1498–1506 | Succeeded by Ottaviano Visconti Riario |
| Preceded by Lorenzo Cybo de Mari | Cardinal-bishop of Albano; 1503–1507 | Succeeded by Bernardino López de Carvajal |
| Preceded by Girolamo Basso della Rovere | Cardinal-bishop of Sabina; 1507–1508 | Succeeded by Giovanni Antonio Sangiorgio |
| Preceded by ? | Bishop of Savona; 1508–1516 | Succeeded by ? |
| Preceded by Cosimo dei Pazzi | Bishop of Arezzo; 1508–1511 | Succeeded by Girolamo Sansoni |
| Preceded by Jorge da Costa | Cardinal-bishop of Porto; 1508–1511 | Succeeded by Domenico Grimani |
| Preceded by Oliverio Carafa | Cardinal-bishop of Ostia; 1511–1521 | Succeeded by Bernardino López de Carvajal |
| Preceded by Oliverio Carafa | Dean of the College of Cardinals; 1511–1521 | Succeeded by Bernardino López de Carvajal |
| Preceded by Leonardo Grassi-Della Rovere | Bishop of Lucca; 1517 | Succeeded by Francesco Riario-Sforza |
| Preceded by Diego Ramírez de Fuenleal | Bishop of Málaga; 1518-1521 | Succeeded by César Riario |
