= García de Sahagún =

16th-century Catholic bishop

García de Sahagún was a 16th-century Bishop of the Roman Catholic Church.

He was the Titular Bishop of Berytus (The Roman Catholic Diocese in Beirut, Lebanon). and the Diocese of Cuenca.

He was a member of the Order of the Blessed Virgin Mary of Mercy.
