= Juan Francisco Pacheco =

Spanish Roman Catholic prelate

Most Reverend Juan Francisco Pacheco
- Bishop of Cuenca
- Church: Catholic Church
- Diocese: Diocese of Cuenca
- In office: 1653–1663
- Predecessor: Enrique Pimentel Zúñiga
- Successor: Francisco de Zárate y Terán
- Previous post: Bishop of Córdoba (1652–1653)

Orders
- Consecration: 23 Mar 1653 by Alfonso de Sanvítores de la Portilla

Personal details
- Born: 1605 Rome, Italy
- Died: 24 May 1663 (aged 57–58) Cuenca, Spain

Juan Francisco Pacheco (1605 – 24 May 1663) was a Roman Catholic prelate who served as Bishop of Cuenca (1653–1663) and Bishop of Córdoba (1652–1653).

== Biography ==
Juan Francisco Pacheco was born in Rome, Italy in 1605. On 14 October 1652, he was appointed during the papacy of Pope Innocent X as Bishop of Córdoba. On 23 March 1653, he was consecrated bishop by Alfonso de Sanvítores de la Portilla, Bishop of Almería. On 6 October 1653, he was appointed during the papacy of Pope Innocent X as Bishop of Cuenca. He served as Bishop of Cuenca until his death on 24 May 1663.

== External links and additional sources ==
- Cheney, David M. "Diocese of Córdoba". Catholic-Hierarchy.org. (for Chronology of Bishops)^{self-published}
- Chow, Gabriel. "Diocese of Córdoba". GCatholic.org. (for Chronology of Bishops)^{self-published}
- Cheney, David M. "Diocese of Cuenca". Catholic-Hierarchy.org. (for Chronology of Bishops) ^{[self-published]}
- Chow, Gabriel. "Diocese of Cuenca (Spain)". GCatholic.org. (for Chronology of Bishops) ^{[self-published]}

Catholic Church titles
Preceded by Pedro Tapia	Bishop of Córdoba; 1652–1653	Succeeded by Antonio Valdés Herrera
Preceded by Enrique Pimentel Zúñiga	Bishop of Cuenca; 1653–1663	Succeeded by Francisco de Zárate y Terán
