= Andrés Pacheco =

17th-century Roman Catholic bishop

Most Reverend Andrés Pacheco
- Patriarch of West Indies
- Church: Catholic Church
- In office: 1625–-1626
- Predecessor: Diego Guzmán de Haros
- Successor: Alfonso Pérez de Guzmán

Orders
- Consecration: 1588 by Cesare Speciano

Personal details
- Born: 5 April 1550 La Puebla de Montalbán, Spain
- Died: 7 April 1626 (age 76)

Andrés Pacheco (1550–1626) was a Spanish churchman and theologian.

== Biography ==
Andrés Pacheco was born in La Puebla de Montalbán on 5 April 1550. His father was Alonso Pacheco y Téllez-Girón, Lord of La Puebla de Montalbánm, who was a Knight of the Order of Santiago and commander of Medina de las Torres. His mother was Juana de Cárdenas, daughter of Alonso de Cárdenas, Conde of Puebla del Maestre.

He studied grammar, dialectic, philosophy, and theology at the University of Alcalá, graduating with a doctorate in theology. Philip II of Spain named Pacheco tutor of his nephew Albert VII, Archduke of Austria, who later became a cardinal and Governor of the Habsburg Netherlands. Pacheco later became Abbot of San Vicente de la Sierra (connected to the Cathedral of Toledo) and of then of the Cathedral of Alcalá de Henares (1584–87).

On 2 December 1587, the cathedral chapter of the Segovia Cathedral elected Pacheco bishop of Segovia; during his time as bishop of Segovia, he held a diocesan synod. He was translated on 13 August 1601, becoming Bishop of Cuenca.

Pacheco resigned his bishopric in 1622, the same year he was appointed Grand Inquisitor of Spain. He was also Patriarch of the West Indies from 1625

Pacheco died on 7 April 1626.

== External links and additional sources ==
- Cheney, David M. "Patriarchate of West Indies". Catholic-Hierarchy.org. (for Chronology of Bishops) ^{[self-published]}
- Chow, Gabriel. "Titular Patriarchal See of Indias Occidentales". GCatholic.org. (for Chronology of Bishops) ^{[self-published]}

Catholic Church titles
| Preceded by Francisco Ribera Obando | Bishop of Segovia; 1587–1601 | Succeeded by Maximilian of Austria |
| Preceded by Pedro Portocarrero (bishop, died 1600) | Bishop of Cuenca; 1601–1622 | Succeeded by Enrique Pimentel Zúñiga |
| Preceded by Luis de Aliaga Martínez | Grand Inquisitor of Spain; 1622–1626 | Succeeded by Antonio Zapata y Cisneros |
| Preceded by Diego Guzmán de Haros | Patriarch of the West Indies; 1625–1626 | Succeeded by Antonio Manrique de Guzmán |
