= Julian of Cuenca =

Spanish saint

Saint Julián
- Bishop of Cuenca
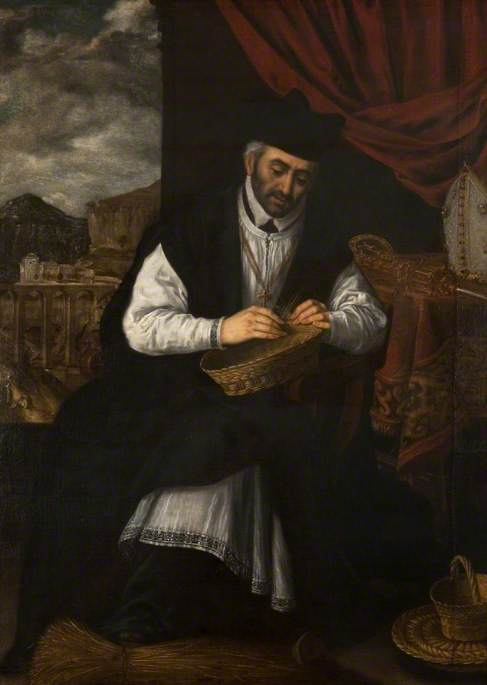
- Saint Julián of Cuenca by Eugenio Cajes
- Church: Roman Catholic Church
- Diocese: Cuenca
- See: Cuenca
- Appointed: 1196
- Term ended: 20 January 1208
- Predecessor: Juan Yáñez
- Successor: Pedro Laurencio

Orders
- Ordination: 1166
- Consecration: June 1196 by Martín López de Pisuerga

Personal details
- Born: Julián c. 1127 Burgos, Kingdom of Castile
- Died: 20 January 1208 (aged 80) Cuenca, Crown of Castile
- Buried: Cuenca Cathedral
- Denomination: Roman Catholic
- Parents: Tauro
- Profession: Basket weaver

Sainthood
- Feast day: 28 January
- Venerated in: Roman Catholic Church
- Canonized: 18 October 1594 by Pope Clement VIII
- Attributes: Making baskets; Mitre; Crozier; Episcopal attire
- Patronage: Cuenca; Invoked for rain; Basket-weavers; Janiuay, Iloilo

Julián of Cuenca (c. 1127 – 28 January 1208), also known as Saint Julián, was a Spanish Roman Catholic prelate who served as the Bishop of Cuenca from 1196 until his death. He also served as a professor and preacher in addition to being a simple hermit. He became a bishop after the Moors were driven from Cuenca and he made pastoral visits to the people in his diocese where he fed prisoners and provided grain for the poor farmers. But he never forgot his desire to live in solitude and made annual trips where he could best find silence before reemerging to resume his episcopal duties.

His canonization was solemnized on 18 October 1594.

== Life ==
Julián was born in Burgos to the nobleman Tauro, perhaps in a Mozarabic family.

He studied at the cathedral school there before he studied at the University of Palencia where he earned his doctorate. He was appointed a professor in the philosophical and theological departments in Palencia in 1153. During his time in Palencia he worked as a basket-maker and maker of other trade goods in order to earn extra income for the poor as well to support himself.

In 1163 he left Palencia and his teaching duties to live a life of solitude in a modest house outside Burgos located on the banks of the Arlanzón. He was ordained to the priesthood in 1166 after having received the minor orders. He and his companion Lesmes lived a life of mortification and contemplation. He and his friend took to the road as itinerant preachers and reached both Córdoba and Toledo in 1191.

But this solitude and travelling ended in 1191 when the Archbishop of Toledo Martín II López de Pisuerga appointed Julián as the archdeacon at Toledo. He exercised his administrative duties but continued preaching as well as making baskets in order to generate income for the poor. Julián served as the archdeacon until the Bishop of Cuenca Juan Yáñez died and Alfonso VIII of Castile chose Julián to succeed Yáñez in 1196. The Archbishop of Toledo conferred episcopal consecration upon him that June.

Julián was known for his almsgiving and he visited the poor in prisons. His outreach to all faiths was great as was his desire to make pastoral visits to see the faithful in his diocese. He often offered grain to the poor to alleviate their suffering and also aided the poor peasant farmers in the region.

He continued to preach while he went about reforming the practices of the diocesan priests in addition to engaging with charities to better help the poor. He likewise supported these charities to provide for the needs of his flock in addition to the Jews and Muslims. On an annual basis he would retire to live a life of solitude and contemplation and continued his habit of making baskets. There is a legend associated with him that Jesus Christ appeared to him in the guise of a beggar in order to thank him.

He died in his diocese in 1208; his remains were housed in the Cuenca Cathedral but reinterred under an altar made in his honor in 1578 at the same cathedral.

== Canonization ==
His canonization was solemnized under Pope Clement VIII on 18 October 1594. His relics were housed in a casket underneath the altar dedicated to him and Bishop Inocencio Rodríguez Díez authenticated the relics; Díez served as the diocesan bishop from 1943 until 1973. His name would be included in the Roman calendar in the 1590s.

== See also ==
- Roman Catholic Diocese of Cuenca
