= Francisco Torres Sánchez de Roa =

Roman Catholic prelate

Most Reverend Francisco Torres Sánchez de Roa
- Church: Catholic Church
- Diocese: Diocese of Lugo
- In office: 1650–1651
- Predecessor: Juan del Pozo Horta
- Successor: Juan Bravo Lasprilla

Orders
- Consecration: April 1650 by Diego Arce Reinoso

Personal details
- Born: 1594 Becerril de Campos, Spain
- Died: 14 July 1651 (57) Lugo, Spain

Francisco Torres Sánchez de Roa (1594 – 14 July 1651) was a Roman Catholic prelate who served as Bishop of Lugo (1650–1651).

== Biography ==
Francisco Torres Sánchez de Roa was born in Becerril de Campos, Spain in 1594. On 24 January 1650, he was appointed during the papacy of Pope Innocent X as Bishop of Lugo. In April 1650, he was consecrated bishop by Diego Arce Reinoso, Bishop of Tui. He served as Bishop of Lugo until his death on 14 July 1651.

== External links and additional sources ==
- Cheney, David M. "Diocese of Lugo". Catholic-Hierarchy.org. (for Chronology of Bishops) ^{[self-published]}
- Chow, Gabriel. "Diocese of Lugo (Spain)". GCatholic.org. (for Chronology of Bishops) ^{[self-published]}

Catholic Church titles
| Preceded by Juan del Pozo Horta | Bishop of Lugo; 1650–1651 | Succeeded by Juan Bravo Lasprilla |
