= Diocese of Cuenca =

Diocese of the Catholic Church in Spain

Diocese of Cuenca Dioecesis Conchensis Diócesis de Cuenca

Catholic
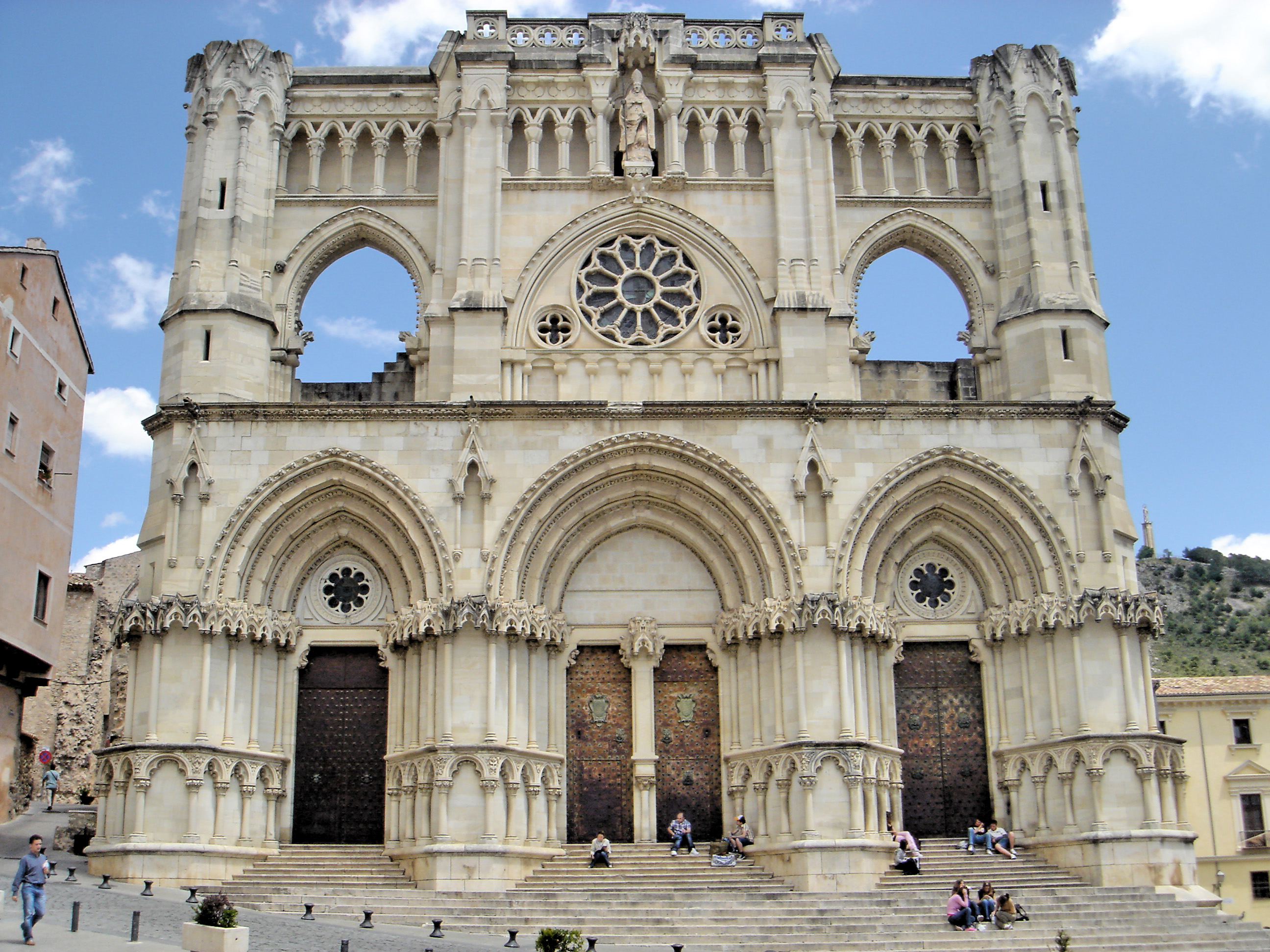
- Cuenca Cathedral

Location
- Country: Spain
- Ecclesiastical province: Toledo
- Metropolitan: Toledo

Statistics
- Area: 17,140 km^{2} (6,620 sq mi)
- Population: (as of 2006); 200,577

Information
- Denomination: Catholic
- Rite: Latin Rite
- Established: 5 July 1183
- Cathedral: Cathedral of Saint Mary and Saint Julian

Current leadership
- Pope: Leo XIV
- Bishop: José María Yanguas Sanz
- Metropolitan Archbishop: Braulio Rodríguez Plaza

Website
- Website of the Diocese

The Roman Catholic Diocese of Cuenca (Latin: Dioecesis Conchensis) is a Latin Church diocese located in the city of Cuenca in the ecclesiastical province of Toledo in Spain.

== History ==
After the reconquest of Cuenca in 1177, the Diocese of Cuenca was erected in 5 July 1183 during the papacy of Pope Lucius III.

== Leadership ==
Bishops of Cuenca (Roman rite)

- Juan Yáñez (1183 – 1195)
- St. Julian of Cuenca (1196 – 1208 Died)

. . .

- Mateo Rinal (1247 – 1257)
- Pedro Laurencio (1262 – 1271 Died)
- Gonzalo Pérez Gudiel (1272 – 27 Sep 1275 Appointed, Bishop of Burgos)

. . .

- Gonzalo Diego Palomeque (15 Mar 1289 – 16 Jan 1299 Appointed, Archbishop of Toledo)
- Pascual (1299 – 1320)
- Estêvão Miguéis (1322 – 1326)
- Fernando Gutiérrez (bishop) (11 Apr 1326 – 1327 Died)
- Juan del Campo (bishop) (8 Aug 1327 – 7 May 1328 Appointed, Bishop of Oviedo)
- Odón (1328 – 1338)
- Gonzalo Aguilar Hinojosa (1341 – 1342)
- García (1342 – 1359)
- Bernal Zafón (1362 – 1372)
- Pedro Gomez Barroso (4 Mar 1373 – 1378 Appointed, Bishop of Évora)
- Nicolás Fernández de Biedma (1378 – 1381)
- Álvaro Martínez (1382 – 1396)
- Juan Cabeza de Vaca (1396 – 1407)
- Diego de Anaya Maldonado (1407 – 1418)
- Álvaro Núñez de Isorna (1418 – 1445)
- Lope de Barrientos, O.P. (7 Apr 1445 – 30 May 1469 Died)
- Giacopo Antonio Venier (6 Oct 1469 – 3 Aug 1479 Died)
- Raffaele Sansone Riario (13 Aug 1479 – 8 Jul 1482 Appointed, Administrator of Salamanca)
- Alfonso de Burgos, O.P. (1482 – 1485 Appointed, Bishop of Palencia)
- Alfonso de Fonseca (26 Aug 1485 – 24 May 1493 Appointed, Bishop of Osma)
- Raffaele Sansone Riario (24 May 1493 – 9 Jul 1521 Died)
- Diego Ramírez de Fuenleal (1518 – 1537 Died)
- Alessandro Cesarini (Sr.) (24 May 1538 – 13 Feb 1542 Died)
- Sebastián Ramírez de Fuenleal (Arellano) (2 Jun 1542 – 22 Jan 1547 Died)
- Miguel Muñoz (bishop) (12 Apr 1547 – 13 Sep 1553 Died)
- Pedro Castro Lemos (5 Jun 1555 – 1 Aug 1561 Died)
- Bernardo de Fresneda, O.F.M. (4 May 1562 – 16 Nov 1571 Appointed, Bishop of Córdoba)
- Gaspar de Quiroga y Vela (17 Dec 1571 – 6 Sep 1577 Appointed, Archbishop of Toledo)
- Diego de Covarrubias y Leiva (6 Sep 1577 – 27 Sep 1577 Died)
- Rodrigo de Castro Osorio (de Lemos) (13 Jun 1578 – 20 Oct 1581 Appointed, Archbishop of Sevilla)
- Gómez Zapata (8 Nov 1582 – 1 Feb 1587 Died)
- Juan Fernández Vadillo (7 Aug 1587 – 1 Sep 1595 Died)
- Pedro Portocarrero (bishop, died 1600) (28 May 1597 – 20 Sep 1600 Died)
- Andrés Pacheco (13 Aug 1601 – 1622 Resigned)
- Enrique Pimentel Zúñiga (13 Feb 1623 – 11 Jun 1653 Died)
- Juan Francisco Pacheco (6 Oct 1653 – 24 May 1663 Died)
- Francisco de Zárate y Terán (28 Jan 1664 – 21 Dec 1679 Died)
- Alonso Antonio de San Martín (21 Oct 1681 – 5 Jul 1705 Died)
- Miguel del Olmo Manrique (22 Mar 1706 – 27 Feb 1721 Died)
- Juan Lancaster (or Alencaster) Norona (16 Jun 1721 – 31 Oct 1733 Died)
- Diego González Toro y Villalobos (5 May 1734 – 13 Sep 1737 Died)
- José Flores Osorio (3 Mar 1738 – 26 Nov 1759 Died)
- Isidro Carvajal Lancaster (21 Jul 1760 – 15 Jan 1771 Died)
- Sebastián Flóres Pabón (29 Jul 1771 – 25 Jul 1777 Died)
- Felipe Antonio Solano Marín (1 Mar 1779 – 10 May 1800 Died)
- Antonio Palafox y Croy de Abre (20 Oct 1800 – 9 Dec 1802 Died)
- Ramón Falcón y Salcedo (28 Mar 1803 – 20 Nov 1826 Died)
- Jacinto Rodríguez Rico (21 May 1827 – 12 Jan 1841 Died)
- Juan Gilberto Ruiz Capucín y Feijó (17 Dec 1847 – 9 Oct 1848 Died)
- Fermín Sánchez Artesoro, O.F.M. Cap. (2 Apr 1849 – 4 Dec 1855 Died)
- Miguel Payá y Rico (25 Jun 1858 – 16 Jan 1874 Appointed, Archbishop of Santiago de Compostela)
- Sebastián Herrero y Espinosa de los Monteros, C.O. (17 September 1875 – 18 December 1876 Confirmed, Bishop of Vitoria)
- José Moreno y Mazón (20 Mar 1877 – 18 Nov 1881 Appointed, Patriarch of the West Indies)
- Juan María Valero y Nacarino (27 Mar 1882 – 16 Nov 1890 Died)
- Pelayo González y Conde (1 Jun 1891 – 18 Nov 1899 Died)
- Wenceslao Sangüesa y Guía (19 Apr 1900 – 1921 Retired)
- Cruz Laplana y Laguna (30 Nov 1921 Appointed – 7 Aug 1936 Died)
- Inocencio Rodríguez Díez (10 Jun 1943 – 13 Apr 1973 Retired)
- José Guerra Campos (13 Apr 1973 – 26 Jun 1996 Retired)
- Ramón del Hoyo López (26 Jun 1996 – 19 May 2005 Appointed, Bishop of Jaén)
- José María Yanguas Sanz (23 Dec 2005 – )

== Auxiliary bishops ==
- García de Sahagún, O. de M. (11 Mar 1501 –)
- García Gil Manrique (5 Mar 1618 – 30 Aug 1627)
- Rodrigo Cruzado Caballero (8 Jan 1652 – ?)
- Juan de Las Peñas (30 Aug 1723 – 10 Jul 1726)
- Pedro del Cañizo Losa y Valera (11 Sep 1726 – ?)

== See also ==
- Roman Catholicism in Spain
- Cuenca Cathedral

== Sources ==
- Catholic Hierarchy ^{[self-published]}
