= Fernando Gutiérrez (bishop) =

Roman Catholic bishop of Córdoba

Most Reverend Fernando Gutiérrez
- Bishop of Cuenca
- Church: Catholic Church
- Diocese: Diocese of Cuenca
- In office: 1326–1328
- Successor: Juan del Campo (bishop)
- Previous post: Bishop of Córdoba (1300–1326)

Orders
- Consecration: by Niccolò Boccasini

Personal details
- Died: 1327 Cuenca, Spain

Fernando Gutiérrez (died 1327) was a Roman Catholic prelate who served as Bishop of Cuenca (1326–1327) and Bishop of Córdoba (1300–1326).

== Biography ==
On 12 Jul 1300, Fernando Gutiérrez was consecrated bishop by Niccolò Boccasini, Cardinal-Bishop of Ostia e Velletri. On 13 Jun 1300, Fernando Gutiérrez was appointed during the papacy of Pope Boniface VIII as Bishop of Córdoba. On 11 Apr 1326, he was appointed during the papacy of Pope John XXII as Bishop of Cuenca. He served as Bishop of Cuenca until his death in 1327.

== External links and additional sources ==
- Cheney, David M. "Diocese of Córdoba". Catholic-Hierarchy.org. (for Chronology of Bishops)^{self-published}
- Chow, Gabriel. "Diocese of Córdoba". GCatholic.org. (for Chronology of Bishops)^{self-published}
- Cheney, David M. "Diocese of Cuenca". Catholic-Hierarchy.org. (for Chronology of Bishops) ^{[self-published]}
- Chow, Gabriel. "Diocese of Cuenca (Spain)". GCatholic.org. (for Chronology of Bishops) ^{[self-published]}

Catholic Church titles
Preceded by	Bishop of Córdoba; 1300–1326	Succeeded by
Preceded by	Bishop of Cuenca; 1326–1327	Succeeded by Juan del Campo (bishop)
