= Martín Fernández de Vilches =

Roman Catholic bishop

Most Reverend Martín Fernández de Vilches
- Bishop of Ávila
- Church: Catholic Church
- Diocese: Diocese of Ávila
- In office: 1456–1469
- Predecessor: Alonso Fernández de Madrigal
- Successor: Alfonso de Fonseca

Personal details
- Died: 13 November 1469 Ávila, Spain

Martín Fernández de Vilches (also Martín de Vilches) (born Vilches, Kingdom of Jaén, ? – Bonilla de la Sierra, died (13 November 1469), was a Roman Catholic prelate who served as Bishop of Ávila (1456–1469).

== Biografia ==
Of humble origins, he was born in the Kingdom of Jaén. He worked as a bureaucrat during the reign of John II of Castile, and advanced to become counsellor for Henry IV of Castile. In 1436, he served as master of the Capella de Reyes Nuevos de la catedral de Toledo and canon de Jaén from 1449 until 1452.

After the ascent of Henry IV to the throne (1454), he was named Canceller Major de La Poridad, replacing Rodrigo de Villacorta, who was in disagreement with the monarch. In 1456, he was nominated by the king as Roman Catholic Diocese of Ávila and confirmed by Pope Paul II, vacant since the death of Alonso Tostado, where he served until his death in 1469. During the Spanish civil war against Alfonso of Castile, he was a supporter of Henry IV of Castile.

== Bibliography ==
- Cañas Gálvez, Francisco de Paula (2012). Burocracia y cancillería en la corte de Juan II de Castilla (1406-1454): estudio institucional y prosopográfico (in Catalan). Salamanca: Ediciones Uniersidad de Salamanca. ISBN 9788478002214.
- Ferrer García, Félix A (May–August 2008). "Clérigos y feligreses en la Basílica de San Vicente de Ávila: actividades litúrgicas, lúdicas y funerarias (siglos XVI-XVII)" (in Catalan). um LXVIII (229). Hispania. Revista Española de Historia: 341–374.
- González Dávila, Gil (1647). Teatro eclesiastico de las iglesias metropolitanas y catedrales de los reynos de las dos Castillas (in Catalan). Vol. II. Madrid: Imprenta de Pedro Horna y Villanueva.
- Nieto Soria, José Manuel (1993). Iglesia y génesis del estado moderno en Castilla (1369-1480) (in Catalan). Madrid: Editorial Complutense. ISBN 9788474914856.

Catholic Church titles
Preceded by Alonso Fernández de Madrigal	Bishop of Ávila; 1456–1469	Succeeded by Alfonso de Fonseca
