= Castiltierra =

Town in Segovia, Castile and León, Spain

Coordinates: 40°23.08′N 3°31.75′W

- Municipality
- Castiltierra
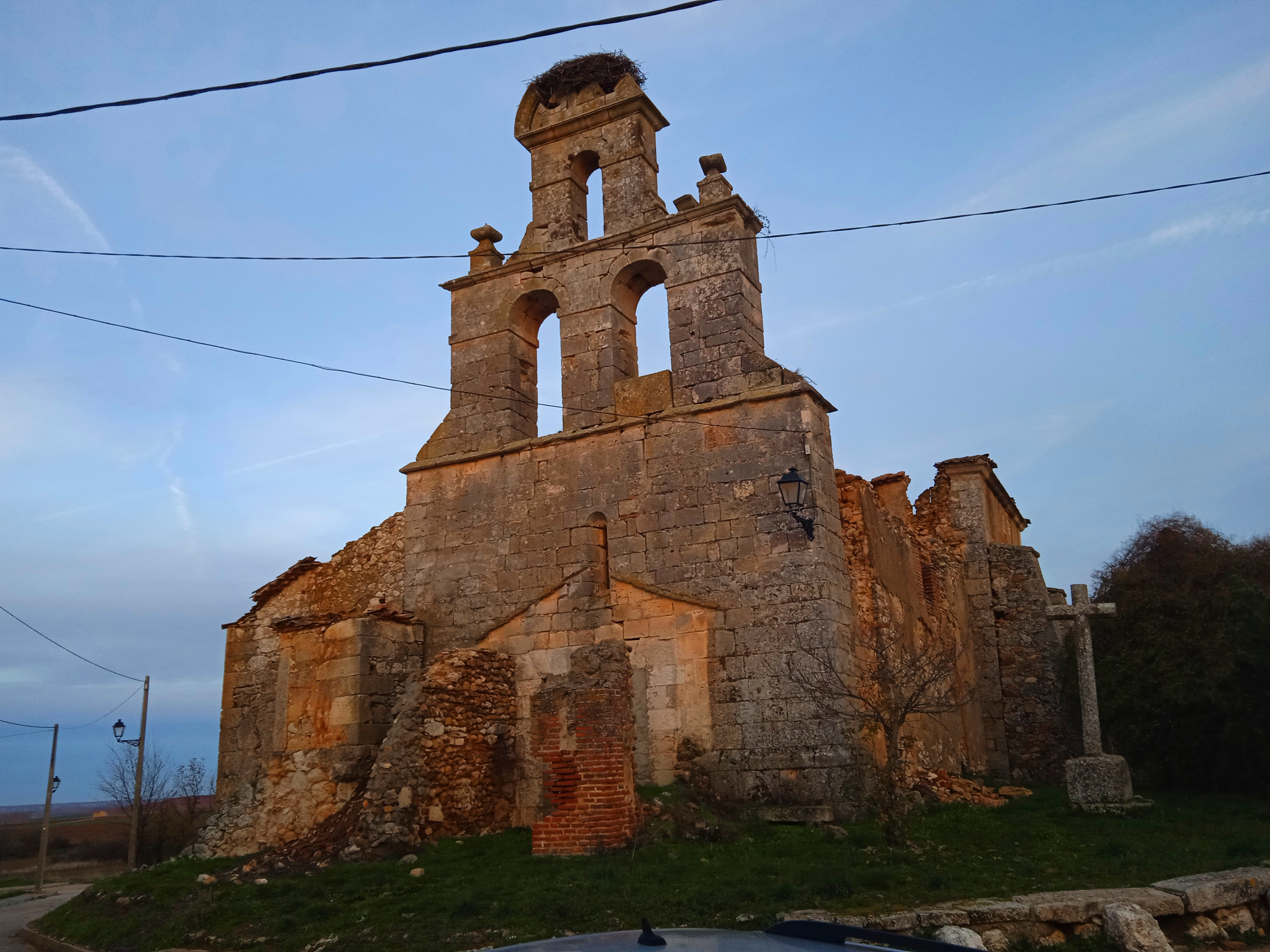
- Church of San Juan in Castiltierra.

- Location in Spain. Castiltierra (Spain)
- Country: Spain
- Autonomous community: Castile and León
- Province: Segovia
- Municipality: Fresno de Cantespino
- Elevation: 965 m (3,166 ft)

Population (2023)
  - Total: 4
- Time zone: UTC+1 (CET)
  - Summer (DST): UTC+2 (CEST)
- Postal code: 40518

Castiltierra is a city and a municipality which belongs to the municipality of Fresno de Cantespino, located in the province of Segovia, Castile and León, Spain.

According to the 2023 census (INE), the locality has a population of 4 inhabitants.

The town is known for its proximity to a Visigoth necropolis, looted by Nazi Germany during the Second World War.

== History ==
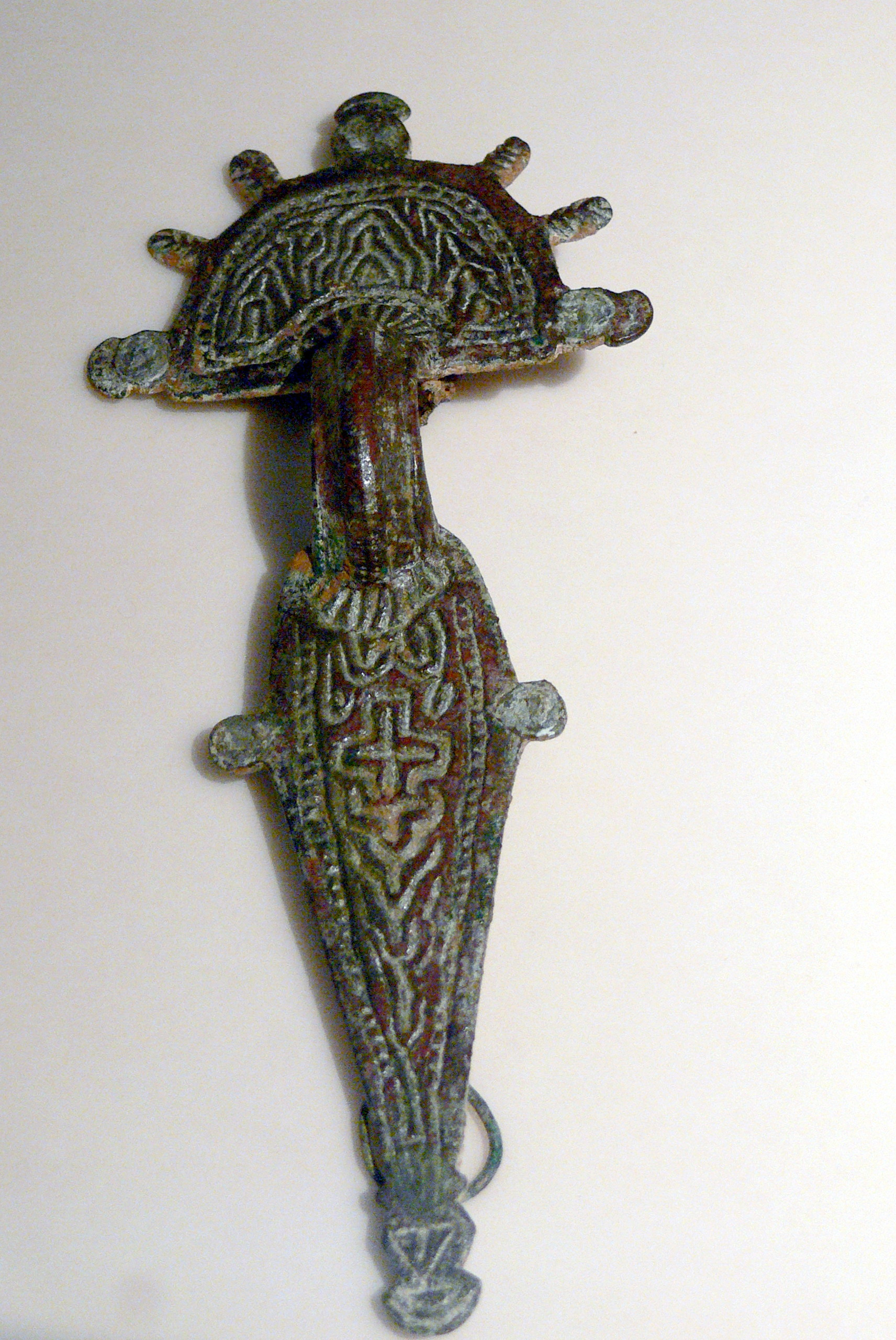
Fibula from Castiltierra, 6th century, Germanisches Nationalmuseum

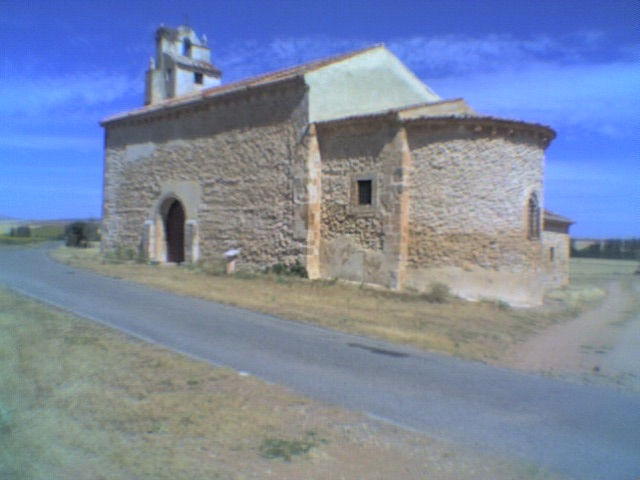
Hermitage of El Corporario

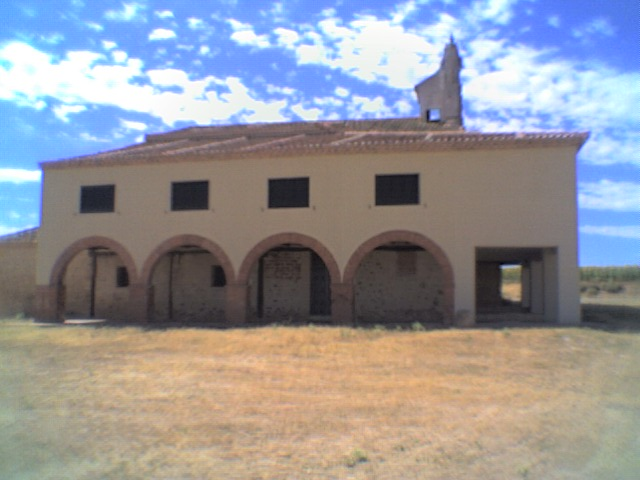
Hermitage of El Corporario

In 1247 it was mentioned as Castiel de Tierra, already being a town belonging to the Comunidad de Villa y Tierra de Fresno de Cantespino, as it is today; in the 16th century it was already named in its current form.

Nearby is the site of Las Milaneras, an old Roman camp, and there is also evidence of Roman presence in the nearby town of Riaguas de San Bartolomé.

It was an independent municipality with its own town hall until at least 1842, and in 1857 it was already listed as a district of Fresno de Cantespino.

In 1864 the residents asked the civil governor to separate Fresno and add it to the municipality of Cascajares, a request that was denied.

== Demography ==
Demographic evolution of Castiltierra
1842	2000	2002	2004	2006	2008	2009	2010	2012	2014	2016	2018	2020	2022
75	11	10	10	6	4	5	4	3	3	5	2	5	1
(Source: INE)

== Culture ==
=== Heritage ===
- Romanesque church of San Juan, in a state of ruin;
- Hermitage of Santo Cristo del Corporario, where the battle of the Reconquista of the same name took place. It is named after a carving of Jesus Christ.

==== Necropolis from the Visigothic period ====
With more than 800 bodies, it was discovered by farmers in 1931, and the first excavation campaign was carried out between 1932 and 1935, led by Joaquín María de Navascués and Emilio Camps Cazorla.

During the Second World War, the germanophile Julio Martínez Santa-Olalla led the second campaign with a German delegation led by J. Werner, a member of the hierarchical leadership of archaeology in the Third Reich and personally sent by Heinrich Himmler, who was very interested in the project that linked it to a German Aryan race. The spanish archaeologist Domingo Fletcher also participated in collaborating with the Nazis.

At the end of the campaign, Santa-Olalla temporarily gave the jewels found to the German government for restoration. Today these pieces remain in German and Austrian museums.

=== Parties ===
- Pilgrimage on Pentecost Sunday, at the Hermitage of Santo Cristo del Corporario.
- Town Festival, the weekend closest to August 15.
