= Diego Ramírez =

Diego Ramírez may refer to:

- Diego Ramírez de Guzmán (bishop of León) (died 1354)
- Diego Ramírez de Guzmán (bishop of Oviedo) (1412–1441)
- Diego Ramírez de Guzmán (died 1508), bishop of Catania
- Diego Ramírez de Arellano (c. 1580–1624), Spanish sailor and cosmographer
- Diego Ramírez (footballer) (born 1981), Mexican football defender
- Diego Ramirez (artist) (born 1989), Australian/Mexican artist

== See also ==
- Diego Ramírez Islands, a small group of islands in Chile, named for the sailor
