= Luis Ángel de las Heras Berzal =

Spanish prelate

The Most Reverend Luis Ángel de las Heras Berzal C.F.M.
- Bishop of León in Spain
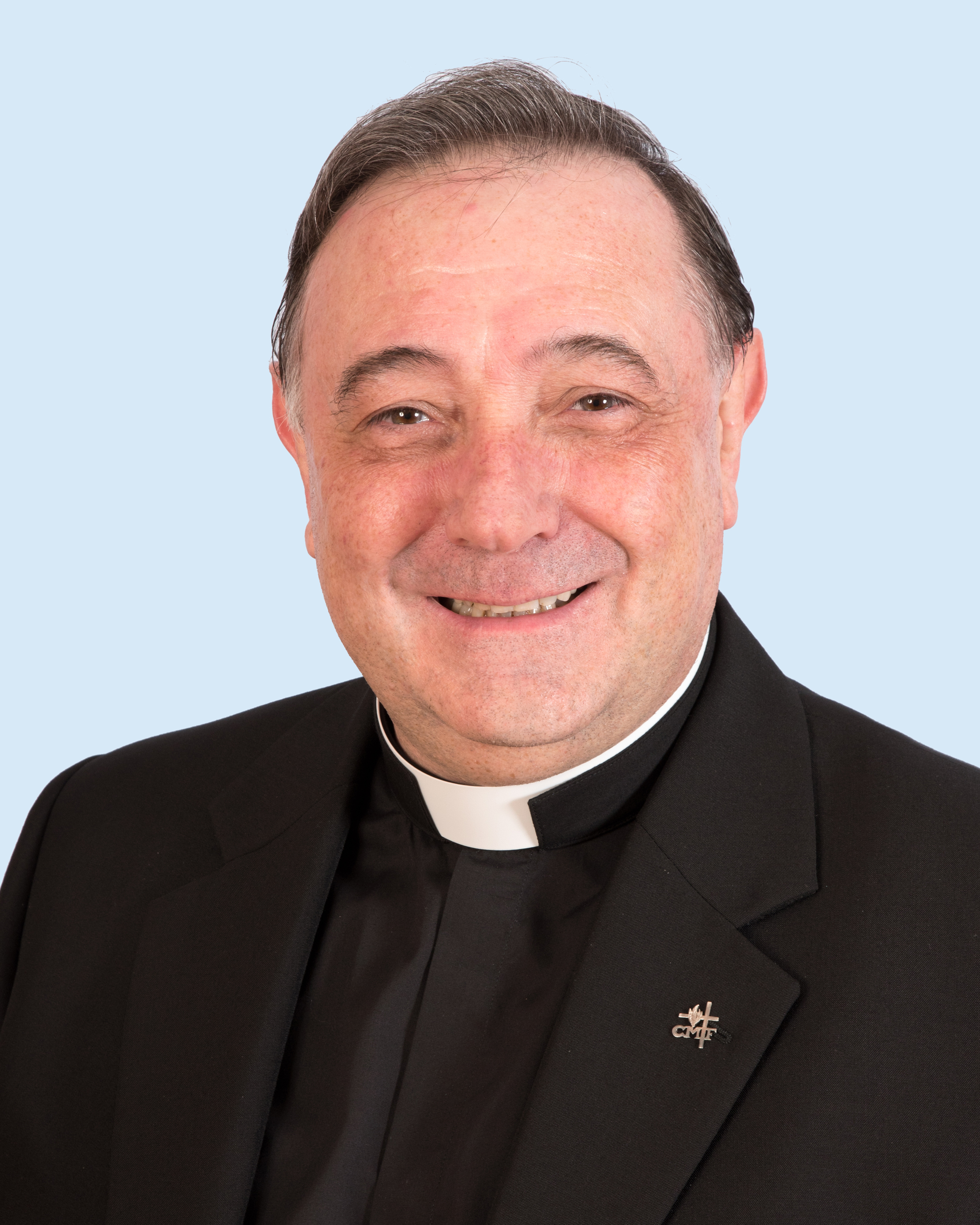
- Church: Catholic Church
- Appointed: 21 October 2020
- Installed: 2020
- Predecessor: Julián López Martín
- Previous post(s): Bishop of Mondoñedo-Ferrol (2016–2020)

Orders
- Ordination: 29 October 1988 by Luis Gutiérrez Martín C.F.M.
- Consecration: 27 May 2016 by Julián Barrio Barrio

Personal details
- Born: Antonio Ángel Algora Hernando; 14 June 1962 (age 62); Segovia, Spain
- Coat of arms

Luis Ángel de las Heras Berzal C.F.M. (born 14 June 1963) is a Spanish prelate of the Catholic Church who served as bishop of León in Spain. He previously served as the bishop of Mondoñedo-Ferrol from 2016 to 2020.

== Biography ==
Born in Segovia, de las Heras Berzal joined the Missionary Sons of the Immaculate Heart of Mary (colloquially known as the Claretians) as a novice in 1981. On 26 April 1986 he took his perpetual religious vows, and in the same year he was awarded a degree in ecclesiastical studies. He then studied science of education at the Comillas Pontifical University, while at the same time he worked in the field of youth pastoral care for the Claretian province of Castilla.

He was ordained to the priesthood by Luis Gutiérrez Martín C.M.F. on 29 October 1988 in the Segovia Cathedral.

On 16 March 2016 it was announced that de las Heras Berzal had been chosen by Pope Francis to be the new bishop of the Diocese of Mondoñedo-Ferrol, replacing Manuel Sánchez Monge who had been appointed as the new bishop of Santander the previous year. He was ordained a bishop on 7 May 2016 by the archbishop of Santiago, Julián Barrio Barrio, with Renzo Fratini and Fernando Sebastián Aguilar serving as co-consecrators.

On 21 October 2020 it was announced that Pope Francis had chosen de las Heras Berzal as the new bishop of León, succeeding the retiring Julián López Martín.
