= Peter I (bishop of León) =

Peter I (Spanish Pedro) was the bishop of León from about 1087 until his deposition around 1111.

During his episcopate, the city of León declined in importance relative to the city of Toledo. Peter had to contend with the claim of the archbishops of Toledo that the diocese of León lay within their province, a claim approved by Pope Urban II in 1099. In 1104, Peter successfully convinced Urban's successor, Paschal II, to grant León an exemption from metropolitan control on the basis of a forged document, the so-called Division of Wamba. Significantly, the dioceses of León and Oviedo had common interests at this time. The only copies of the Division that support the Leonese claims emanate from the scriptorium of the cathedral of Oviedo under Bishop Pelagius, a notorious forger. The original of the papal bull of exemption still survives in the cathedral of León.

When Duke Raymond of Galicia died on 20 September 1107 in his castle of Grajal in the diocese of León, Bishop Peter gave permission for his body to be brought back to Santiago de Compostela for burial.

Peter was present at the marriage of Queen Urraca of León and King Alfonso I of Aragon in Monzón in October 1109, for he witnessed the queen's grant of a fuero to the men of the land of León and Carrión on 29 September, while she was on her way to meet her groom. He was with the royal court at Sahagún when it celebrated Christmas that year, for he signed a private document there on 21 December. Civil war broke out in the new year between the partisans of Urraca and those of Alfonso. After receiving a papal letter condemning her marriage on grounds of consanguinity, the queen sought the advice of some bishops, Peter among them. They advised her to separate from her husband. After the king of Aragon's victory in the battle of Candespina on 26 October 1111, Peter's advice to Urraca cost him his see; the partisans of Alfonso had him removed from office. The diocese was briefly usurped by Archbishop Maurice of Braga, before Peter's nephew Diego was elected bishop. Peter himself went into exile in Galicia, where he was still alive as of 13 June 1112.

== See also ==
- Catholic Church in Spain

== Sources ==
- Fletcher, Richard A. (1978). The Episcopate in the Kingdom of León in the Twelfth Century. Oxford: Oxford University Press.
- Reilly, Bernard F. (1982). The Kingdom of León-Castilla under Queen Urraca, 1109–1126. Princeton, NJ: Princeton University Press.
- Reilly, Bernard F. (1988). The Kingdom of León-Castilla Under King Alfonso VI, 1065–1109. Princeton, NJ: Princeton University Press.
