= Diego (bishop of León) =

Diego was the Bishop of León from 1112 or 1113 until his deposition in 1130. He succeeded his uncle Pedro, whose episcopate, and life, had ended in exile after the Battle of Candespina (1111). After a brief usurpation by Archbishop Maurice of Braga, Diego was elected to replace Pedro.

Diego spent much of his episcopate repairing his diocese from the damage wrought by the civil war between the supporters of Queen Urraca and Alfonso the Battler. There is evidence from 1120 and from a royal charter of 4 November 1123 of Diego "exploiting new sources of revenue, restoring the property of the chapter and the ecclesiastical routine of the cathedral, settling a dispute with his chapter." He continued his uncle's struggle for independence from the archdiocese of Toledo, at which he was not initially successful. In 1121 Pope Calixtus II declared León a suffragan of Toledo. In 1125 Honorius II confirmed it, but by 1130 Diego had succeeded in getting this decision reversed and regained his prior exemption. He did not have it for long. He was deposed by a synod held in Carrión de los Condes in 1130, probably at the instigation of his Toledan opponents. His successor, Arias, was illegally consecrated by the archbishop of Toledo.
