= San Juan y San Pedro de Renueva =

Building in León, España

Coordinates: 42°36′13″N 5°34′33″W

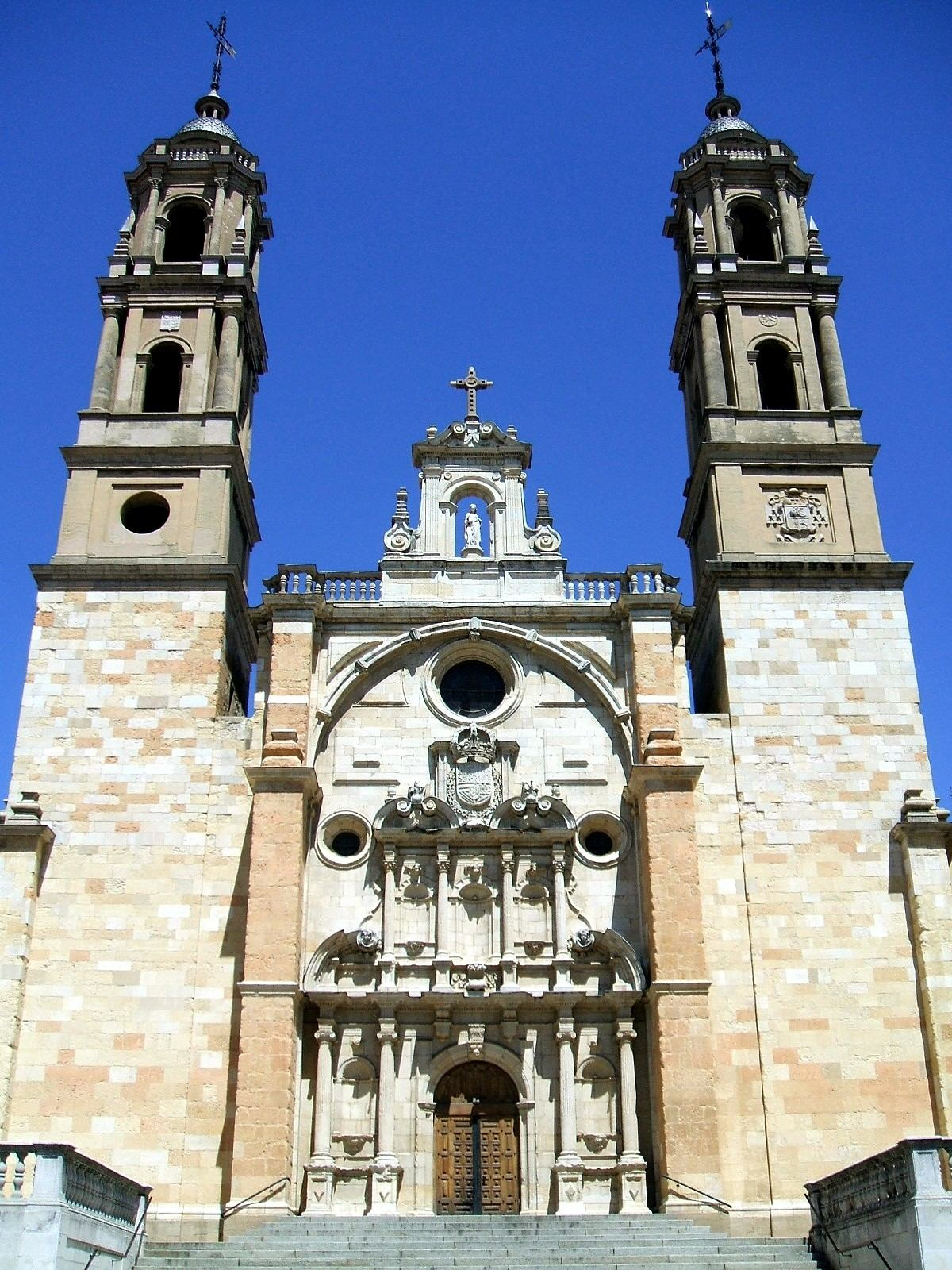
San Juan y San Pedro de Renueva.

San Juan y San Pedro de Renueva is a church in León, central Spain.

It was built in the mid-20th century in Neo-Renaissance style by will of the local bishop, Luis Almarcha Hernández. Its main artistical feature is the entrance gate, in Baroque style, taken from the ruined monastery of San Pedro de Eslonza, located 22 km outside León in the municipality of Gradefes. It dates from 1711 and was designed by the architect Pedro Martínez de Cardeña. It has three orders, the first characterized by four Ionic columns over pedestals, the second similar to the former, apart the use of Corinthian columns and the narrower length. It is sided by two circular windows, and surmounted by another one over a coat of arms. The façade ha five niches, now empty, but originally housing statues of saints.

The central façade is sided by two slender bell towers dating to the 20th-century edifice.

== Sources ==
- Llamazare Rodríguez, Fernando (2001). Guía de León (in Spanish). Ediciones Lancia. ISBN 84-86205-19-0.
