= Monastery of San Pedro de Eslonza =

Former Benedictine monastery in Spain

Coordinates: 42°35′13″N 5°21′13″W

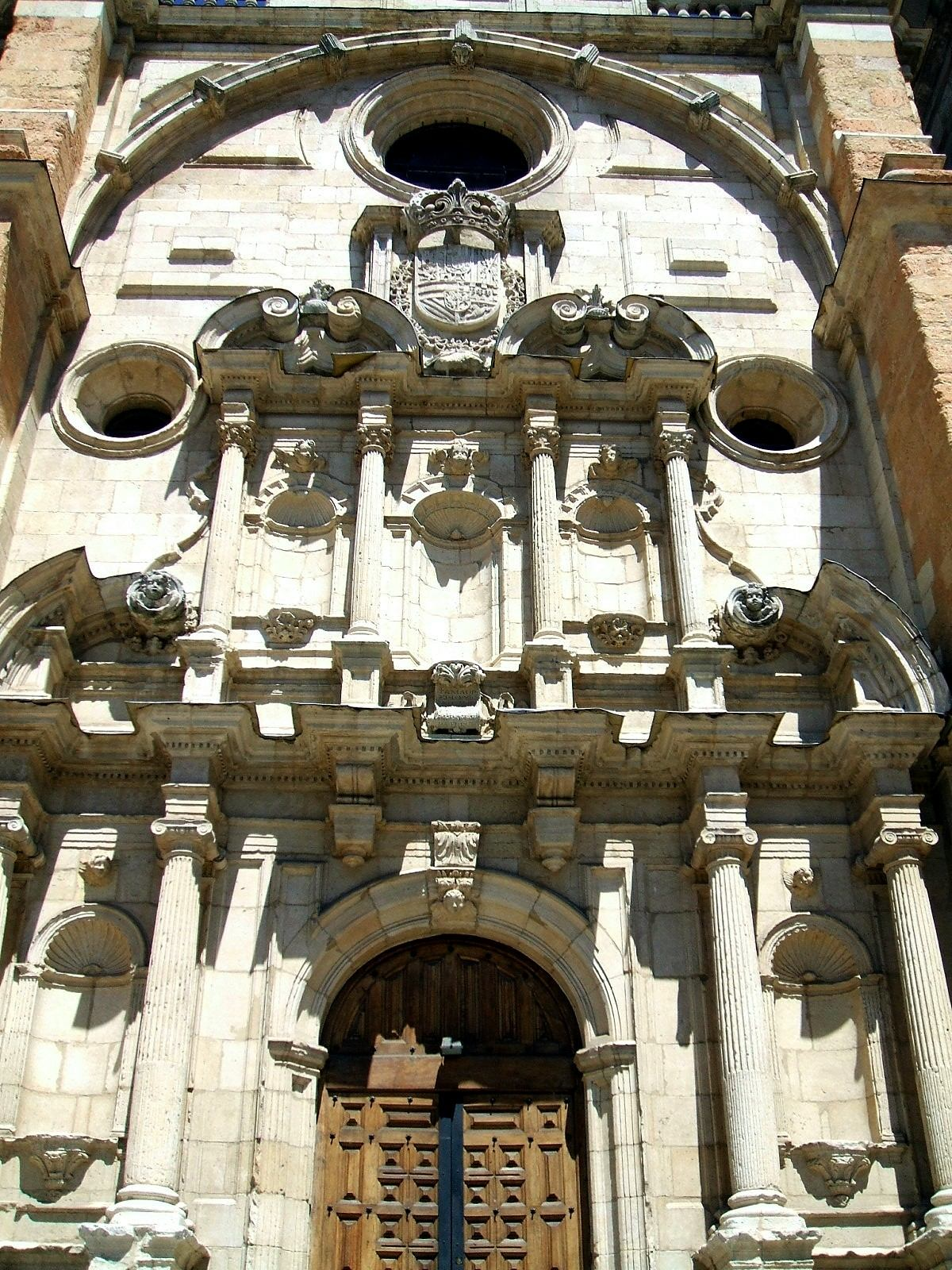
Former monumental gate of the monastery, now part of the church of San Juan y San Pedro de Renueva in León.

The Monastery of San Pedro de Eslonza is a former Benedictine monastery in Gradefes, in the province of León, central Spain.

Today in ruins, it was once the second most important monastery in the province, after the Monastery of San Benito in Sahagún. It was founded in 912 by King García I of León, but was destroyed by the Moorish ruler Al-Mansur Ibn Abi Aamir in 988; it was therefore rebuilt in 1099 by the Urraca of Zamora, daughter of Ferdinand I of León and Castile. In 1109 she became queen of Galicia, León and Castile, and gave consistent donations to the monastery.

The edifice was in ruinous state in the 16th century, and was therefore restored with, among the other interventions, three new Renaissance portals. The main façade was added in Baroque style: its niches once housed statues of saints, now disappeared.

The monastery's prosperity suffered a severe blow in 1836 with the Ecclesiastical Confiscation of Mendizábal, by which it was sold and its artistic heritage split between numerous buyers. Its decline continued despite the fact that, in 1931, it was declared a national monument. In the period between 1944 and 1970 bishop Luis Almarcha Hernández moved its portals to the church of San Juan y San Pedro de Renueva, at León, saving them from destruction.

== Church of San Juan de Berbío ==
The Church of San Juan de Berbío (Infiesto), in the Piloña council in Asturias, Spain, was donated by the Infanta Doña Urraca to the Monastery of San Pedro de Eslonza in 1099.

The structure went through several redesigns in the fifteenth and sixteenth centuries. The most extensive was in the eighteenth century, which added square heads and porch trim. Of the original Romanesque design, all that remains are the basic building layout, the western facade double archivolt and bows and starts from the original facade. Until 1892, it was the parish church for Infiesto.

The church was destroyed by fire in 1936, during the Civil War, in which the eighteenth-century altarpiece was also burned.
