= Juan Fernández Temiño =

Bishop of León from 1546 to 1556

Most Reverend Juan Fernández Temiño
- Bishop of León
- Church: Catholic Church
- Diocese: Diocese of León
- In office: 1546–1556
- Predecessor: Esteban Almeida
- Successor: Andrés de la Cuesta

Personal details
- Died: 9 November 1556 León, Spain

Juan Fernández Temiño (died 9 November 1556) was a Roman Catholic prelate who served as Bishop of León (1546–1556).

== Biography ==
On 19 July 1546, Juan Fernández Temiño was appointed during the papacy of Pope Paul III as Bishop of León. On 10 October 1546, he was consecrated bishop. He served as Bishop of León until his death on 9 November 1556.

== External links and additional sources ==
- Cheney, David M. "Diocese of León". Catholic-Hierarchy.org. (for Chronology of Bishops) ^{[self-published]}
- Chow, Gabriel. "Diocese of León". GCatholic.org. (for Chronology of Bishops) ^{[self-published]}

Catholic Church titles
Preceded by Esteban Almeida	Bishop of León; 1546–1556	Succeeded by Andrés de la Cuesta
