= Antonio Vilaplana Molina =

Spanish Catholic bishop

- Bishop of León
- Church: Catholic Church
- Diocese: Diocese of León
- In office: 9 February 1987 – 19 March 2002
- Predecessor: Juan Ángel Belda Dardiñá
- Successor: Julián López Martín
- Previous post: Bishop of Plasencia (1976-1987)

Orders
- Ordination: 18 December 1949
- Consecration: 31 October 1976 by José María García Lahiguera

Personal details
- Born: 28 February 1926 Alcoy, Province of Alicante, Kingdom of Spain
- Died: 14 January 2010 (aged 83)

Antonio Vilaplana Molina (28 February 1926 – 14 January 2010) was the Catholic bishop of the Diocese of León, Spain.

Ordained on 18 December 1949, Vilaplana Molina was appointed bishop of the Roman Catholic Diocese of Plasencia on 17 September 1976, and he was ordained on 31 October 1976. On 9 February 1987, he was appointed bishop of the Diocese of León, retiring on 19 March 2002. Vilaplana Molina died of renal failure on 14 January 2010.
