= MARS Melbourne Art Rooms =

Coordinates: 37.854729°S 144.993363°E

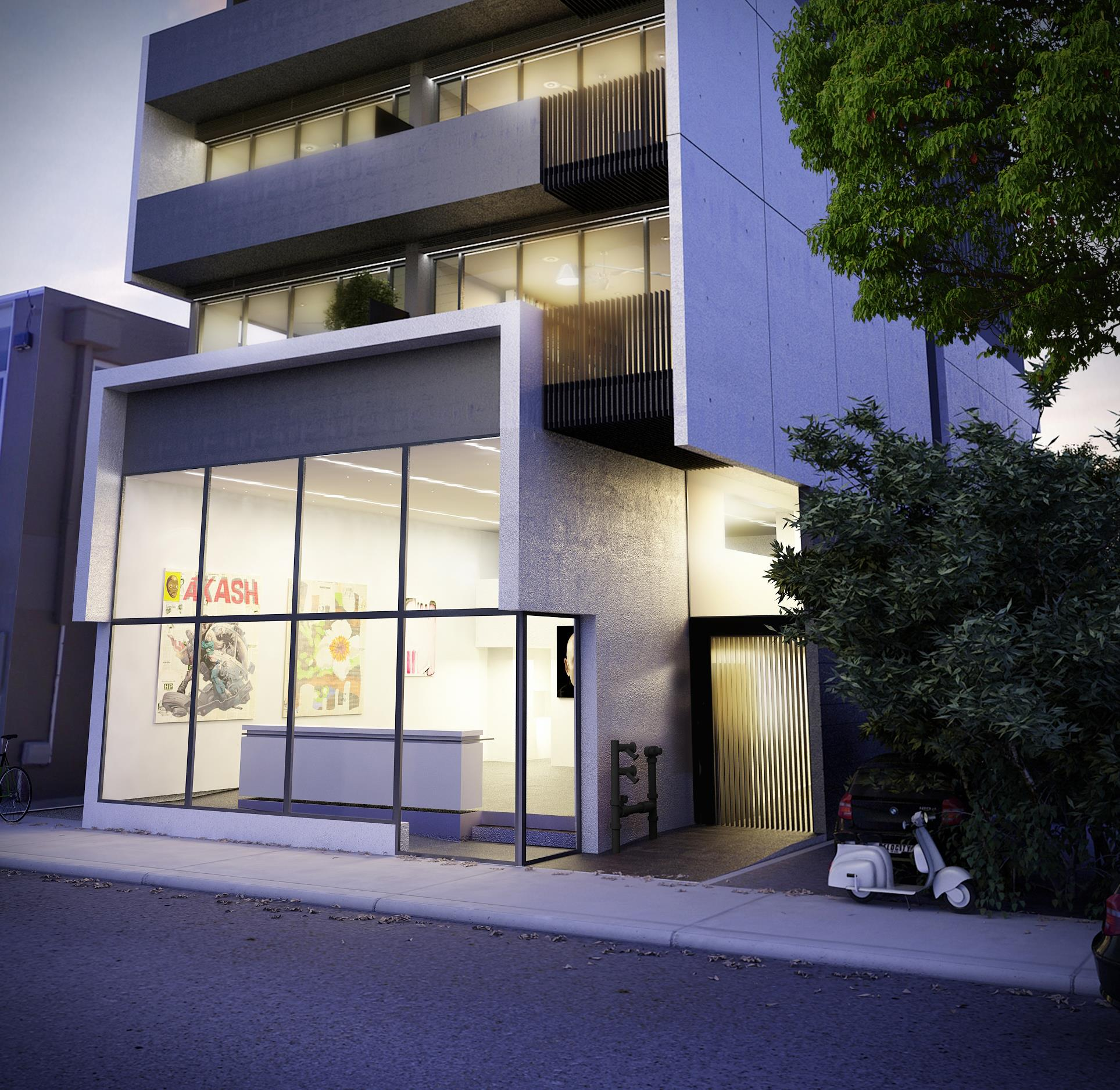
[MARS] Gallery, Australia

[MARS] Melbourne Art Rooms is a contemporary commercial art gallery in Melbourne, Victoria, Australia. MARS Gallery specialises in exhibiting, promoting and building the careers of contemporary Australian and International artists.

== History ==
MARS was established by gallerist Andy Dinan in 2004, who converted a former dairy in Port Melbourne into a two-level contemporary gallery. In 2014, MARS relocated to a new purpose-built gallery at 7 James St, Windsor, (in the City of Stonnington).

MARS specialises in exhibiting, promoting and building the careers of contemporary Australian artists. Since 2004, MARS Gallery has held over 720 exhibitions across two galleries as well as 30 pop ups, totalling involvement with over 1000 artists. The gallery has participated in 44 art fairs across Australia and the world, including national art fairs including Melbourne Art Fair and Sydney Contemporary. MARS also exhibits in international art fairs including Paris Photo, Photo London, Photo Basel, Art Central Hong Kong and Volta Basel.

== Building ==
The architecture and fit-out of MARS is by JAM Architects in collaboration with gallerist and MARS founder Andy Dinan. The three-level space incorporates amenities for showing new media such as sound sculpture, video and light art. The gallery has four distinct exhibition spaces, including a custom black-box gallery committed to the exhibition of contemporary video art, a light-box room for the display of light and sound works, a drawing room to exhibit works on paper as well as a rooftop sculpture garden accessible by an elevator with a light artwork installed into the elevator shaft by artist Jason Sims.

== Artists ==
MARS represents the careers of emerging to mid-career, contemporary artists. Since establishment, MARS has represented a total of 36 artists whose work has been shown in countless institutional shows nationally and internationally.

MARS Gallery currently represents: Daniel Agdag, Sophia Whitney Hewson, Rainbow Chan, Miranda Hine, The Huxleys, Jenna Lee, Tony Lloyd, Dani McKenzie, Kenny Pittock, Diego Ramirez, Damien Shen, Scotty So, Meagan Streader, Brie Trenerry, Telly Tuita, Kohl Tyler, J Davies and Tricky Walsh.

== Public art ==
In addition to a regular exhibition program, MARS offers a public art consultancy and works alongside artists, property developers, architects and local councils to implement Public Art projects throughout Melbourne, under the title Andy Dinan Art Consulting (ADA Consulting).

Consulting and working from MARS Gallery HQ in Windsor, ADA Consulting have successfully implemented thought provoking, inspiring art into the public realm, adding to the cultural fabric of each community. Recent public art projects include the Level Crossing Removal Project, East Brunswick Village (EBV) and 330 Collins refurbishment with AMP Capital. Since 2019, ADA Consulting has driven the cultural placemaking direction for EBV, a 3.1 hectare urban renewal development in Brunswick and one of Northern Melbourne's largest developments to date, where ADA has primarily engaged local artists to commission public art that will stand the test of time.

Some of the public art commissions curated by ADA Consulting are featured on the following buildings in Melbourne: 50 Albert Rd, Albert Park with artists Emma Davies, Jeremy Kibel and James Hullick; Eden and Haven residential developments with artwork by artists Priscilla Bracks, Daniel Agdag and Alexis Beckett; Smith Street Collingwood (The Smith Street Portrait Project by photographer Jacqueline Mitelman), the Domenico De Clario Project and installation by David Burrows; Footscray Plaza redevelopment featuring a 240-square-metre artwork by Melbourne Artist Matthew Harding on the façade of No.18 Albert; Port Melbourne and Melbourne CBD.

== International art fairs ==
MARS Gallery has participated in art fairs globally, including Paris Photo (2025), Unseen Amsterdam (2024), Photo London (2023), Photo Basel (2022), Aotearoa Art Fair (2022), three consecutive years at Art Central Hong Kong (2017-2019), Art Fair Tokyo (2016) and Korean International Art Fair (2012).

MARS regularly participates in Australian art fairs Sydney Contemporary, Melbourne Art Fair, and Spring 1883.
