= Diocese of León in Spain =

Roman Catholic diocese in Spain

Coordinates: 42.59894°N 5.56624°W

Diocese of León Dioecesis Legionensis Diócesis de León

Catholic
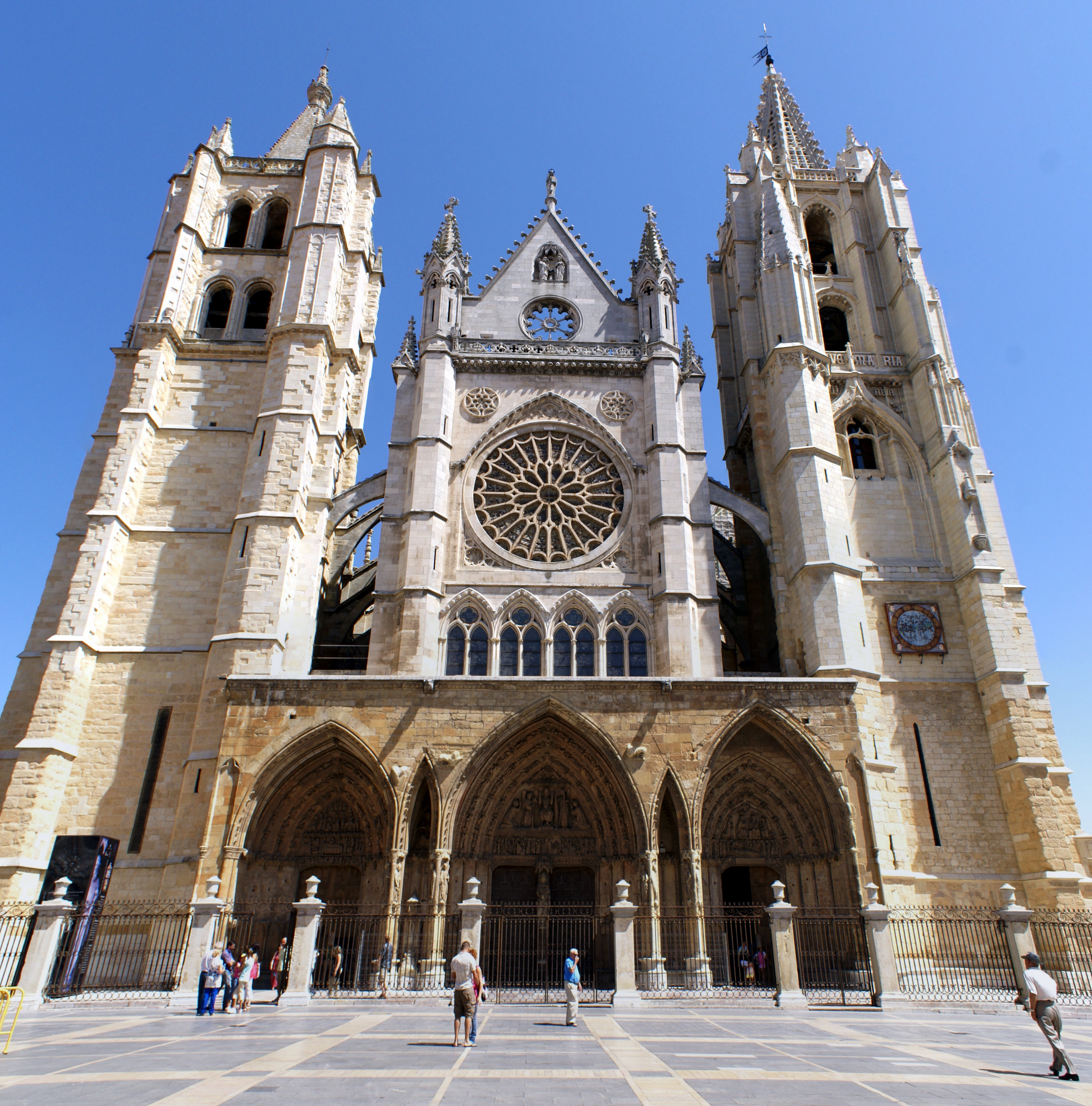
- León Cathedral

- Coat of arms

Location
- Country: Spain
- Ecclesiastical province: Oviedo
- Metropolitan: Oviedo

Statistics
- Area: 9,620 km^{2} (3,710 sq mi)
- Population: Total; Catholics: (as of 2016); 312,196; 305,860 (97.9%)

Information
- Denomination: Roman Catholic
- Rite: Latin Rite
- Established: 4th Century
- Cathedral: Cathedral of Our Lady of the Way in León

Current leadership
- Pope: Leo XIV
- Bishop: Luis Ángel de las Heras Berzal
- Metropolitan Archbishop: Jesús Sanz Montes

Website
- Website of the Diocese

The Diocese of León (Latin: Dioecesis Legionensis) is a Latin Church diocese of the Catholic Church located in the city of León in the ecclesiastical province of Oviedo in Spain.

== History ==
- 4th century: Established as Diocese of León

== Special churches ==
- Minor Basilicas:
  - Real Basílica de San Isidoro de León, León

== Bishops of León ==
- Basilides (deposed 254)
- Savinus (254–???)
- ...
- Decentius (fl. 315)
- ...
- Suintila (792)
- Quintila (811-820)
- Cixila I (853-855)
- Frunimio I (854–874), first bishop of León.
- Mauro (878–886)
- Vincent (899–900)
- Froilán (900–904)
- Sisnando (905–914?)
- Cixila II (911 – 914/15). Died in 938. Retired in 916 to the Monastery of San Cosme y San Damián in Abellar (León) which he had founded.
- Frunimio II (915–924)
- Oveco Núñez (927–950), Carriedo Tejedo calls him the 6th Bishop
- Gonzalo (950/1 – 966)
- Velasco (966 – 973/4)
- Sisnando Puricélliz (974–980), possibly brother of noblemen Sancho and Aznar Puricélliz
- Velasco (again, 980/1)
- Sisnando Baroncélliz (981/2)
- Sabarico (981/2)
- Fortis (fl. 984)
- Sabarico (again, 985–991)
- Fruela (991/2 – 1006)
- Nuño (1007–1026)
- Servando (1026–1040)
- Cipriano (1040–1057)
- Aloito (1057–1063)
- Pelayo Tedóniz (1065– )
- Pedro I (c.1087 – 1111/2)
- Maurice Bourdin (1111–1112/3), usurped the see from Pedro for a brief time
- Diego (1112/3 – 1130)
- Arias Gundesíndiz (1130–1135)
- Pedro (II) Anáyaz (1135–1139)
- Juan Albertínez (1139–1181)
- Manrique de Lara (1181–1205)
- Pedro Muñiz (May 1205 – 1206/07), appointed archbishop of Santiago de Compostela in early 1207. Died on 29 January 1224.
- Pelayo Pérez (February 1207 – 1208), died before consecration
- Rodrigo Álvarez (1208–1232)
- Martín Alonso (1232–1234)
- Arnaldo (1234–1235)
- Juan (1237–1238)
- Martín Arias (1238–1242)
- Nuño Álvarez (1242–1252)
- Martín Fernández (1254–1289)
- Fernando Ruiz de Cabañas (1289–1301)
- Gonzalo de Hinojosa (6 November 1301 – 12 July 1313 appointed Bishop of Burgos), died on 15 May 1327
- Juan Soares (1313)
- Juan Fernández (1316), elect
- Sede vacanta (1316–1318)
- García de Ayerbe (April 1318 – 4 September 1332)
- Juan del Campo (2 December 1332 – 24 May 1344 Died)
- Diego Ramírez de Guzmán (1344–1354)
- Pedro Raimundo (1354–1360)
- Pedro de Barreira, O.S.A. (31 August 1360 – 19 November 1361 Appointed, Bishop of Toul)
- Alfonso (1375–1376)
- Juan Ramírez de Guzmán (1376–1378)
- Fernando (1378–1380])
- Aleramo (1382–1401?)
- Alonso de Argüello (1403–1415), transferred to Palencia
- Álvaro Núñez de Isorna (1415–1418), transferred to Cuenca
- Juan Rodríguez Villalón (1418)
- Alonso de Cusanza (1424–1435)
- Giovanni Berardi (1435–1437), in commendam
- Juan de Mella (12 April 1434 – Did Not Take Effect)
- ...
- Juan de Pontibus (ca. 1446)
- Pedro Cabeza de Vaca (1448–1459)
- Fortún Velázquez de Cuéllar (1460)
- Juan de Torquemada, O.P. (31 July 1460 – 26 January 1463 Appointed, Bishop of Orense)
- Giacopo Antonio Venier (16 September 1464 – 6 October 1469 Appointed, Bishop of Cuenca)
- Rodrigo de Vergara (6 October 1469 – 18 June 1478 Died)
- Luis Velasco (1478–1484 Appointed Bishop of Córdoba)
- Iñigo Manrique de Lara (1484–1485 Appointed Bishop of Córdoba)
- Alonso de Valdivieso (1485 – 21 May 1500 Died)
- Francisco Desprats (4 December 1500 – 10 September 1504 Died)
- Juan de Vera (14 May 1505 – 4 May 1507 Died)
- Francesco Alidosi (1507 – 24 May 1511 Died)
- Luigi d'Aragona (6 June 1511 – 17 December 1516 Resigned)
- Esteban Gabriel Merino (17 December 1516 – 12 June 1523 Appointed, Bishop of Jaén)
- Pedro Manuel (12 June 1523 – 17 June 1534 Appointed, Bishop of Zamora)
- Pedro Alvarez de Acosta (8 January 1535 – 21 May 1539 Appointed, Bishop of Osma)
- Fernando Valdés (30 May 1539 – 29 October 1539 Appointed, Bishop of Sigüenza)
- Sebastián Ramírez de Fuenleal (29 October 1539 – 2 June 1542 Appointed, Bishop of Cuenca)
- Esteban Almeida (2 June 1542 – 16 April 1546 Appointed, Bishop of Cartagena)
- Juan Fernández Temiño (19 July 1546 – 9 November 1556 Died)
- Andrés de la Cuesta (10 December 1557 – 1564 Died)
- Juan de San Millán (28 July 1564 – 11 April 1578 Died)
- Francisco Trujillo Garcia (5 September 1578 – 14 November 1592 Died)
- Juan Alonso Moscoso (30 August 1593 – 9 May 1603 Appointed, Bishop of Malaga)
- Andrés de Casso, O.P. (12 June 1603 – 13 May 1607 Died)
- Francisco Terrones del Caño (3 March 1608 – 13 March 1613 Died)
- Alonso González Aguilar (23 September 1613 – 2 December 1615 Died)
- Juan Llano Valdés (5 September 1616 – 9 August 1622 Died)
- Juan Molina Alvarez (20 March 1623 – Nov 1623 Died)
- Gregorio Pedrosa Cásares, O.S.H. (16 September 1624 – 31 January 1633 Appointed, Bishop of Valladolid)
- Bartolomé Santos de Risoba (26 September 1633 – 9 December 1649 Confirmed, Bishop of Sigüenza)
- Juan del Pozo Horta, O.P. (10 January 1650 – 28 August 1656 Confirmed, Bishop of Segovia)
- Juan Pérez de Vega (López de Vega) (18 September 1656 – 14 September 1659 Died)
- Juan Bravo Lasprilla (7 June 1660 – 31 July 1662 Appointed, Bishop of Cartagena)
- Juan Vande-Escarth y Briceño, O.S.H. (12 January 1665 – 6 April 1672 Died)
- Juan Álvarez Osorio (12 December 1672 – 22 January 1680 Appointed, Bishop of Plasencia)
- Juan Aparicio Navarro (7 October 1680 – 6 November 1696 Died)
- José Gregorio de Rojas y Velázquez (3 June 1697 – 7 April 1704 Appointed, Bishop of Plasencia)
- Manuel Pérez Araciel y Rada (28 April 1704 – 13 June 1714 Confirmed, Archbishop of Zaragoza)
- José Ulzurrun de Asanza y Civera (17 September 1714 – 17 April 1718 Died)
- Martín Zalayeta Lizarza (27 May 1720 – 11 September 1728 Died)
- Juan Fernández Zapata (3 August 1729 – 12 October 1729 Died)
- Francisco de la Torre Herrera (24 July 1730 – 1 February 1735 Died)
- José de Llupiá y Roger, O.S.B. (19 December 1735 – 21 November 1752 Died)
- Alfonso Fernández Pantoja (9 April 1753 – 6 November 1761 Died)
- Pascual de los Herreros (23 August 1762 – 3 March 1770 Died)
- Baltasar Yusta y Navarro (10 September 1770 – 17 February 1777 Appointed, Bishop of Córdoba)
- Cayetano Antonio Cuadrillero Mota (15 December 1777 – 3 April 1800 Died)
- Pedro Luis Blanco (11 August 1800 – 22 November 1811 Died)
- Ignacio Ramón Roda (19 December 1814 – 4 January 1823 Died)
- Joaquín Abarca Blanque (27 September 1824 – 21 June 1844 Died)
- Joaquín Barbajero y Villar (17 January 1848 – 26 February 1863 Died)
- Calixto Castrillo y Ornedo (1 October 1863 – 19 September 1869 Died)
- Saturnino Fernandez de Castro y de la Cotera (5 July 1875 – 15 March 1883 Appointed, Bishop of Burgos)
- Francisco Xavier Caminero y Muñoz (27 March 1885 – 13 April 1885 Died)
- Francisco Gómez-Salazar y Lucio-Villegas (10 June 1886 – 1 October 1904 Retired)
- Juan Manuel Sanz y Saravia (27 March 1905 – 29 April 1909 Appointed, Bishop of Jaén)
- Ramón Guillamet y Coma (29 April 1909 – 18 July 1913 Appointed, Bishop of Córdoba)
- José Álvarez y Miranda (18 July 1913 – 4 March 1937 Died)
- Carmelo Ballester y Nieto, C.M. (12 February 1938 – 10 June 1943 Appointed, Bishop of Vitoria)
- Luis Almarcha Hernández (10 July 1944 – 4 April 1970 Retired)
- Luis María de Larrea y Legarreta (9 July 1971 – 16 February 1979 Appointed, Bishop of Bilbao)
- Fernando Sebastián Aguilar, C.M.F. (22 August 1979 – 28 July 1983 Resigned)
- Juan Angel Belda Dardiñá (28 July 1983 – 9 February 1987 Resigned)
- Antonio Vilaplana Molina (9 February 1987 – 19 March 2002 Retired)
- Julián López Martín (19 March 2002 Appointed – 21 October 2020 Retired)
- Luis Ángel de las Heras Berzal (21 October 2020 Appointed – )

== See also ==
- Roman Catholicism in Spain
- Kingdom of León
- Leonese language

== Bibliography ==
- Carriedo Tejedo, Manuel (2009). "Locus Sancti Martini (SS. VIII – XIII)" (PDF). Estudios Mindonienses. Anuario de estudios histórico-Teológicos de la Diócesis de Mondoñedo-Ferrol (in Spanish) (25). Mondoñedo: Cabildo de la Catedral. Mondoñedo. Centro de Estudios de la Diócesis de Mondoñedo-Ferrol. Fundación Caixa Galicia: 27–78.
- Carriedo Tejedo, Manuel (2002). "Un obispo desconocido de León: Sisnando Baroncélliz (Año 982)". In Morán Suárez, María Antonia; Rodríguez López, María del Carmen (eds.). La documentación para la investigación : homenaje a José Antonio Martín Fuertes (PDF) (in Spanish). Vol. 1. León: Universidad de León. pp. 129–156.
- Reglero de la Fuente, Carlos (2009). "Los primeros arcedianos leoneses (1070 – 1181)". Castilla y el mundo feudal. Homenaje al profesor Julio Valdeón (in Spanish). Vol. I. Valdivieso, María Isabel del Val and Martínez Sopena, Pascual (Dirs.). Valladolid: Junta de Castilla y León. Universidad de Valladolid. ISBN 978-84-9718-582-0.
