= Battle of Viadangos =

Coordinates: 42.95°N 5.75°W

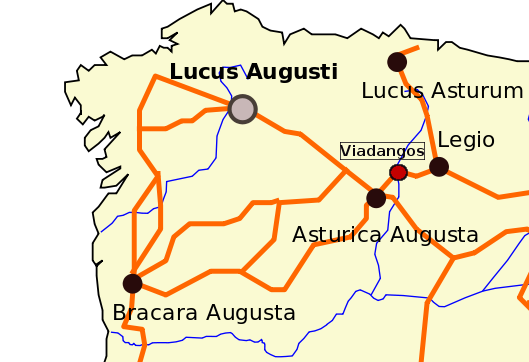
Location of Viadangos in the 12th century.

The Battle of Viadangos or Fontedangos (Fonte de Angos) was fought in the autumn of 1111 between the forces of Alfonso I of Aragon and the Galician allies of his estranged wife, Urraca of León and Castile, at Villadangos north of Luna, some twenty kilometres from León. Alfonso was victorious in a rout, but Urraca's son and co-ruler, Alfonso Raimúndez, escaped.

== Background and preliminary manoeuvres ==
Shortly after the Battle of Candespina, where Alfonso and his ally, Henry, Count of Portugal, had defeated the Castilian troops of Urraca on 26 October, the queen sought to pull Henry away from his alliance with Alfonso. An agreement was reached between her representatives, led by Fernando Garciaz de Hita, and Henry at Sepúlveda. The queen and her new ally then retreated to Palencia, away from Alfonso's army, to finalise a partition of the realm which would have given Henry a greater share than Alfonso had offered. The fortified southern city of Zamora and the royal castle at Ceia north of Sahagún, both in León, were offered to Henry on top of his Portuguese possessions, as were some territories in Castile.

Henry appears to have demanded more than his assistance to her cause could command, however, for Urraca soon entered into secret negotiations with her husband; before leaving she left orders with her men to surrender Palencia to him. The Crónicas anónimas de Sahagún attribute this to the ambitions of Theresa, Urraca's half-sister, Henry's wife, who coveted a queenship and had joined her husband at Palencia. From there the trio split: Henry turned to Zamora to possess it, while Urraca and Theresa went first to Sahagún before the queen moved on to her capital, León. Alfonso moved rapidly to seize Palencia (as agreed with his wife) and he almost captured Theresa while taking Sahagún, before he moved on to León. Probably fearful of her husband's dominance Urraca retreated into the hills of Galicia, probably cut off from contact with her supporters, who were thus left unaware of the new situation.

== Battle and aftermath ==
It was into this new situation that an army organised by Urraca's allies, the count Pedro Froilaz de Traba and apostolic archbishop Diego Gelmírez, ignorantly marched, with Urraca's young son from a previous marriage, Alfonso Raimúndez, in tow. It is possible that Diego and Pedro were intending to have Alfonso receive the homage of the magnates jointly with his mother at León. Eastern Galicia had been in Alfonso's hands since his campaign of 1110. Urraca's allies now recaptured Lugo and, perhaps diminishing their numbers with a garrison in that place, moved in the direction of León. At Viadangos they were ambushed by Alfonso and his Aragonese. According to the Historia Compostelana they possessed no more than 266 knights while Alfonso had 600 cavalrymen and 2,000 infantrymen with him. Pedro Froilaz was captured and the few who escaped captivity took refuge in Astorga. Among the dead was a certain Fernando, misidentified in the Historia Compostelana with the aforementioned count Fernando Garciaz.

Diego, when defeat was turning into a rout, took the young Alfonso and fled in forti Castello Orzilione (quod Castrum est in Castella) ("in the strong castle of Orzilio [which castle is in Castela]"), uniting the boy with his mother. The place where Urraca was staying and where Diego brought Alfonso was probably Orcellón in the diocese of Orense in a district known as Castela, not in Castile, as the text seems to be saying. After delivering Alfonso to Urraca, Diego returned to Astorga to retrieve the wounded and others and lead them back to Santiago de Compostela, from where they had set out.
