= Francisco Trujillo Garcia =

Spanish Roman Catholic prelate

Most Reverend Francisco Trujillo Garcia
- Bishop of León
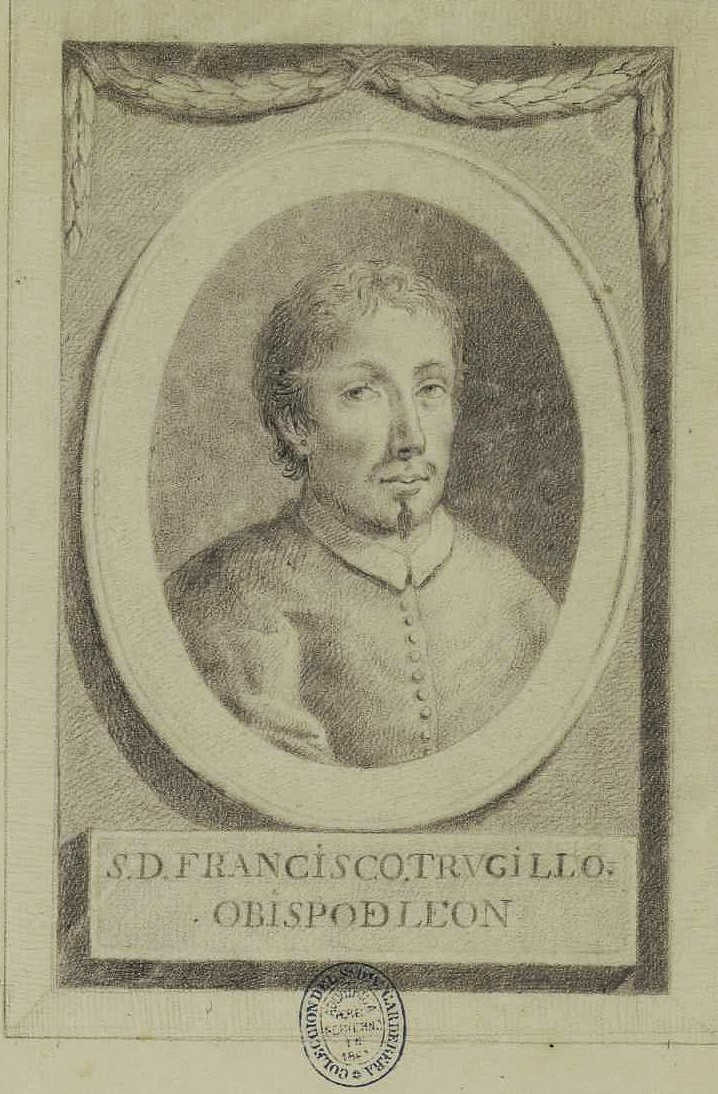
- Church: Catholic Church
- Diocese: Diocese of León
- In office: 1578–1592
- Predecessor: Juan de San Millán
- Successor: Juan Alonso Moscoso

Orders
- Consecration: 1578 by Filippo Sega

Personal details
- Born: 1519 Cañicera, Spain
- Died: 14 November 1592 (age 73) León, Spain

Francisco Trujillo Garcia (1519 – 14 November 1592) was a Roman Catholic prelate who served as Bishop of León (1578–1592).

== Biography ==
Francisco Trujillo Garcia was born in Cañicera, Spain in 1519. On 5 September 1578, he was appointed during the papacy of Pope Gregory XIII as Bishop of León. In 1578, he was consecrated bishop by Filippo Sega, Bishop of Piacenza, with Diego de Simancas, Bishop of Zamora, and Diego de la Calzada, Auxiliary Bishop of Toledo, serving as co-consecrators. He served as Bishop of León until his death on 14 November 1592. While bishop, he was the principal co-consecrator of Juan Ruiz Agüero, Bishop of Zamora (1584), and Pedro Castro Quiñones, Archbishop of Granada (1590).

== External links and additional sources ==
- Cheney, David M. "Diocese of León". Catholic-Hierarchy.org. (for Chronology of Bishops) ^{[self-published]}
- Chow, Gabriel. "Diocese of León". GCatholic.org. (for Chronology of Bishops) ^{[self-published]}

Catholic Church titles
Preceded by Juan de San Millán	Bishop of León; 1578–1592	Succeeded by Juan Alonso Moscoso
