= Alvito (bishop of León) =

Alvito or Aloito (died 1063) was the bishop of León from 1057 until his death.

He was the son of Aloito Fernández de Saavedra, who was a nobleman and senior butler to King Bermudo II of León and Urrace López of Lemos. His older brother, Arias Aloitiz, inherited his father's estate, which included the castle of Arias and the territories of Parga, Villalba and Mondoñedo.

Some sources mention him as confessor to King Fernando I of León, monk and benedictine abbot of the Sahagún Monastery or that of Samos, perhaps confusing him with another prelate of the same name. Various documents from May 1057 list his presence at the head of the diocese after the resignation of his predecessor Cipriano.

In 1063 King Fernando organized an expedition against the taifas of the south peninsula, and after his military successes he sent Albito to Seville and to the Bishop of Astorga Ordoño with the mission to recover the body of Saint Justa. They did not successfully find these remains, but they did find those of Saint Isidoro, whose burial place was revealed to Albito in a revelation, which also revealed his approaching death. Indeed, the bishop from León died a week after discovering the saint's tomb, and Ordoño returned to León with the bodies of both. In the presence of Abbot Silos Saint Domingo, San Isidoro was buried in the Church of Santa Maria the Ruler. According to tradition, before Albito was buried, San Isidoro appeared to King Fernando demanding that his body be present at the burial of Albito, as was finally done.

Although he was not canonized or given an official prayer, he was venerated as a saint in the Church at León. In the Spanish calendar of saints he appears on September 5 or November 8th.
