= Juan de San Millán =

Catholic bishop (1497–1578)

Most Reverend Juan de San Millán
- Bishop of León
- Church: Catholic Church
- Diocese: Diocese of León
- In office: 1564–1578
- Predecessor: Andrés de la Cuesta
- Successor: Francisco Trujillo García
- Previous post: Bishop of Tui (1547-1564)

Personal details
- Born: 1497 Barrionuevo, Spain
- Died: 11 April 1578 (age 81) León, Spain

Juan de San Millán (1497 – 11 April 1578) was a Roman Catholic prelate who served as Bishop of León (1564–1578) and Bishop of Tui (1547–1564).

== Biography ==
Juan de San Millán was born in Barrionuevo, Spain. On June 1547, he was appointed during the papacy of Pope Paul III as Bishop of Tui. On 28 Jul 1564, he was appointed during the papacy of Pope Pius IV as Bishop of León. He served as Bishop of León until his death on 11 April 1578.

== External links and additional sources ==
- Cheney, David M. "Diocese of Tui-Vigo". Catholic-Hierarchy.org. (for Chronology of Bishops) ^{[self-published]}
- Chow, Gabriel. "Diocese of Tui-Vigo (Spain)". GCatholic.org. (for Chronology of Bishops) ^{[self-published]}
- Cheney, David M. "Diocese of León". Catholic-Hierarchy.org. (for Chronology of Bishops) ^{[self-published]}
- Chow, Gabriel. "Diocese of León". GCatholic.org. (for Chronology of Bishops) ^{[self-published]}

Catholic Church titles
Preceded by Miguel Muñoz (bishop)	Bishop of Tui; 1547–1564	Succeeded by Diego Torquemada
Preceded by Andrés de la Cuesta	Bishop of León; 1564–1578	Succeeded by Francisco Trujillo García
