= Juan Ángel Belda Dardiñá =

Spanish Catholic bishop

- Bishop of León
- Church: Catholic Church
- Diocese: Diocese of León
- In office: 28 July 1983 – 9 February 1987
- Predecessor: Fernando Sebastián Aguilar
- Successor: Antonio Vilaplana Molina
- Previous posts: Apostolic Administrator of Tarazona (1981-1982); Bishop of Jaca (1978-1983)

Orders
- Ordination: 29 June 1960
- Consecration: 1 April 1978 by Luigi Dadaglio

Personal details
- Born: 7 September 1926 Bilbao, Biscay, Kingdom of Spain
- Died: 22 February 2010 (aged 83)

Juan Ángel Belda Dardiñá (7 September 1926 – 22 February 2010) was the Catholic bishop of León, Spain.

Ordained a priest on 29 June 1960, he was appointed bishop of the Diocese of Jaca on 31 January 1978 and was ordained bishop on 1 April 1978. On 28 January 1983 he was transferred to the León Diocese resigning on 9 February 1987.
