= Joaquín Abarca =

Spanish prelate (1780–1844)

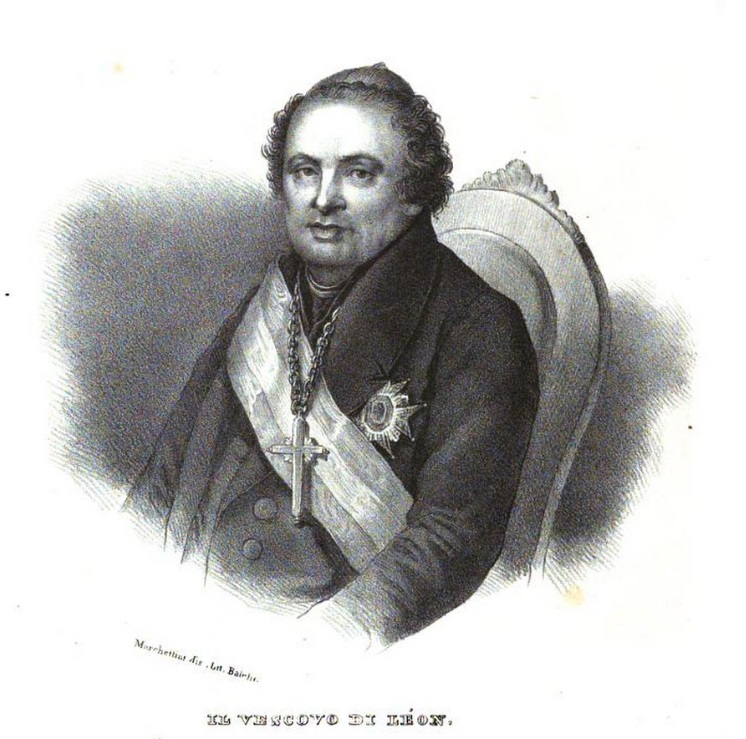

Joaquin Abarca (1780, Huesca – 1844) Spanish prelate. He went on to become Bishop of León in 1824. During the 1833 civil war, he was one of the leaders of the Carlist party.
