= Andy Dinan =

Australian gallery owner

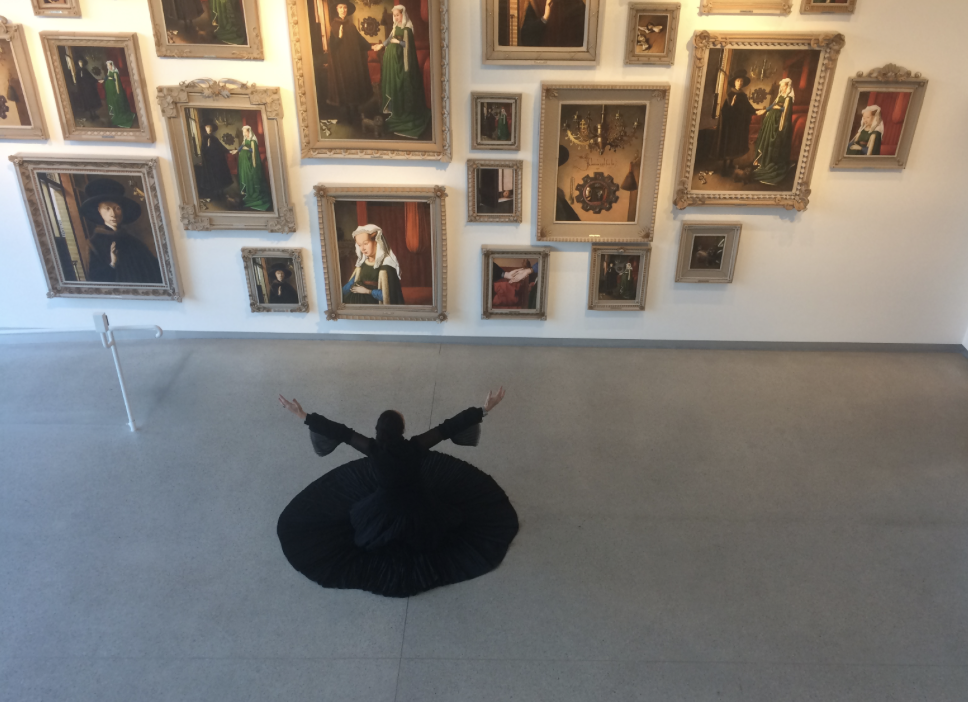
Andy Dinan with 'Artist Unknown' by A.A. at MARS Gallery, 2017. Courtesy of MARS Gallery.

Andy Dinan founded and established Melbourne Art Rooms, known as MARS Gallery in 2004 with a steadfast resolve for promoting Australian artists. MARS Gallery's HQ is located in Windsor, Victoria, Australia, on 7 James Street.

== Background ==
Since its inception, MARS has a mid-career contemporary Australian and International Artists. Under Dinan's direction, MARS enjoys a unique position staging regular exhibitions in excess of 700+ exhibitions featuring over 330 artists. Dinan specialises in exhibiting, promoting and building careers of emerging artists exhibitions, attending international art fairs, curating special events and consulting on major public art commissions.

== Public art ==
Identifying a niche in the market, Dinan established a public art consulting service, ADA Art Consulting, in 2010 that integrates art into large and small-scale property developments. ADA has established prominent connections with Melbourne councils and covers a wide range of projects.

== Philanthropy & awards ==
Entwined in Dinan's professional and private life is an undertaking to help others in need. In addition to working as an Ambassador for TLC, Andy was also on the marketing board for the Salvation Army, Red Shield Appeal for ten years. Her contribution was recognised in The Australian Financial Review and Westpac 100 Women of Influence Awards 2014 in the Philanthropy category. In 2014, Dinan was chosen as one of 100 Women of Influence in the Australian Financial Review and the 100 Women of Influence Awards. In 2018, Andy accepted an invitation to be a Foundation Board Member of the Arts Centre Melbourne, originally known as the Victorian Arts Centre, until 2024.

In 2020, Dinan accepted the award for City of Port Philip Design and Development Awards for Integrated Art in the Opera Project. This is the second time Dinan has been recognised for her work in the City of Port Philip.

In 2026, Dinan joined the judging panel for the Helpmann Academy Graduate Exhibition Awards. Dinan was one of the judges for the Glover Prize 2026, Australia's most prestigious landscape art prize. Dinan sits on the Art Acquisition Reference Group for the City of Port Phillip.
