= Andrés de la Cuesta =

Spanish Roman Catholic prelate

Most Reverend Andrés de la Cuesta
- Bishop of León
- Church: Catholic Church
- Diocese: Diocese of León
- In office: 1557–1564
- Predecessor: Juan Fernández Temiño
- Successor: Juan de San Millán

Personal details
- Died: 1564 León, Spain

Andrés de la Cuesta (died 1564) was a Roman Catholic prelate who served as Bishop of León (1557–1564).

== Biography ==
On 10 December 1557, Andrés de la Cuesta was appointed during the papacy of Pope Paul IV as Bishop of León. In 1558, he was consecrated bishop. He served as Bishop of León until his death in 1564.

== External links and additional sources ==
- Cheney, David M. "Diocese of León". Catholic-Hierarchy.org. (for Chronology of Bishops) ^{[self-published]}
- Chow, Gabriel. "Diocese of León". GCatholic.org. (for Chronology of Bishops) ^{[self-published]}

Catholic Church titles
Preceded by Juan Fernández Temiño	Bishop of León; 1557–1564	Succeeded by Juan de San Millán
