= Gradefes =

Gradefes, Spain
- Flag Coat of arms

- Location within Spain
- Coordinates: 42°37′29″N 5°13′38″W
- Country: Spain
- Autonomous community: Castile and León
- Province: León
- Municipality: Gradefes

Government
  - Mayor: Ana Isabel Ferreras Díez (PSOE)

Area
  - Total: 205.86 km^{2} (79.48 sq mi)
- Elevation: 852 m (2,795 ft)

Population (2025-01-01)
  - Total: 882
  - Density: 4.28/km^{2} (11.1/sq mi)
- Demonym(s): gradefense; gradefeño, gradefeña
- Time zone: UTC+1 (CET)
  - Summer (DST): UTC+2 (CEST)
- Postal Code: 24160
- Telephone prefix: 987
- Website: Ayto. de Gradefes

Gradefes (Spanish pronunciation: [ɡɾaˈðefes]) is a municipality located in the province of León, Castile and León, Spain. As of 2010, the municipality has a population of 1,076 inhabitants.

Sights include the all-female Cistercian monastery of Santa María la Real, founded in 1177, the church of San Miguel de Escalada, the parish church of the Assumption (12th century, in the hamlet of Villarmún), and the ruined monastery of San Pedro de Eslonza.
