= Diego Ramírez de Guzmán (bishop of León) =

Spanish Catholic bishop

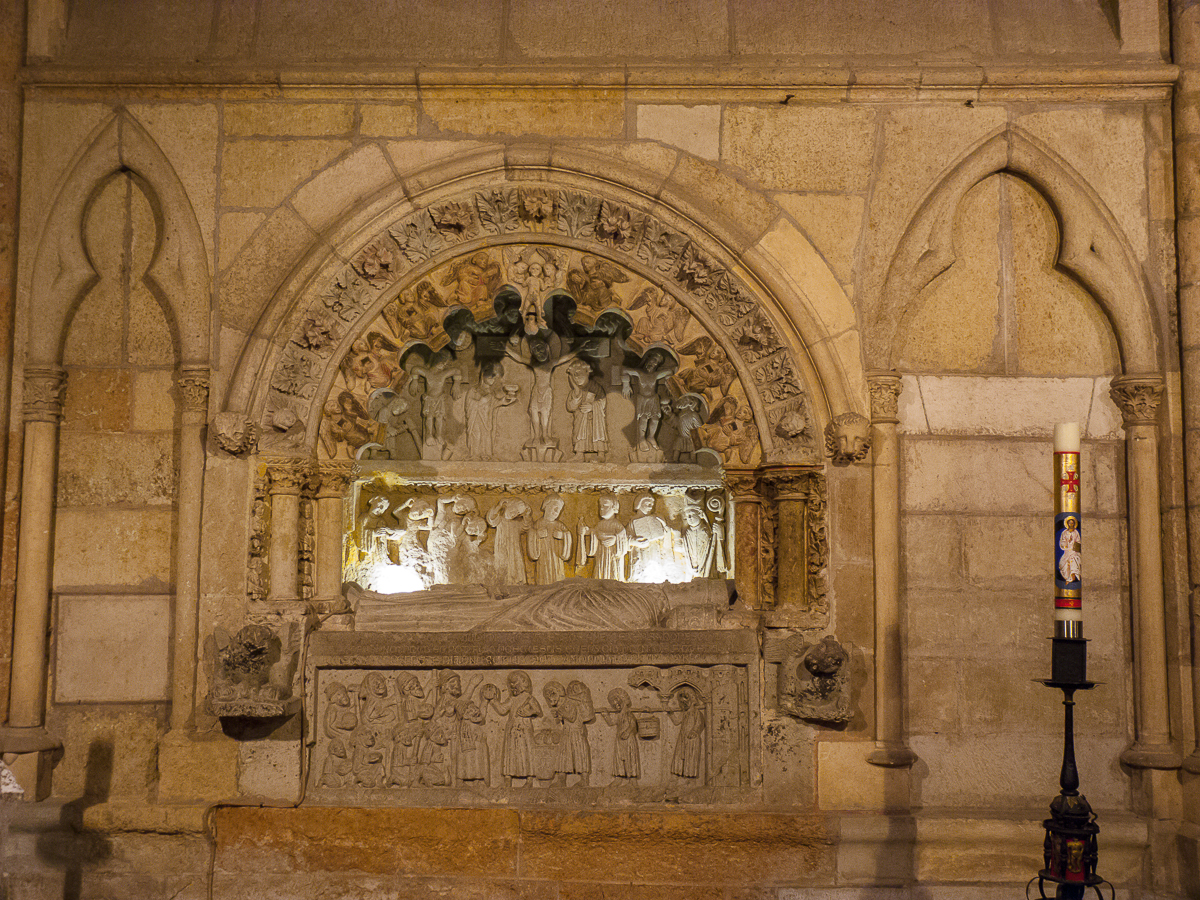
Diego's tomb

Diego Ramírez de Guzmán was a medieval bishop of León (1344–1354). He belonged to the powerful noble family of the Guzmanes.

The ornately carved Puerta de la Gomia, the door between the cathedral of León and the attached cloister, was made during Diego's episcopate. He also had his coat-of-arms carved into the vaulted space between the cathedral and the cloister.

Diego's monumental tomb in the cathedral of León is one of the earliest examples of the enfeu style of sepulchral recess imported from France.
