= Riaguas de San Bartolomé =

- Municipality
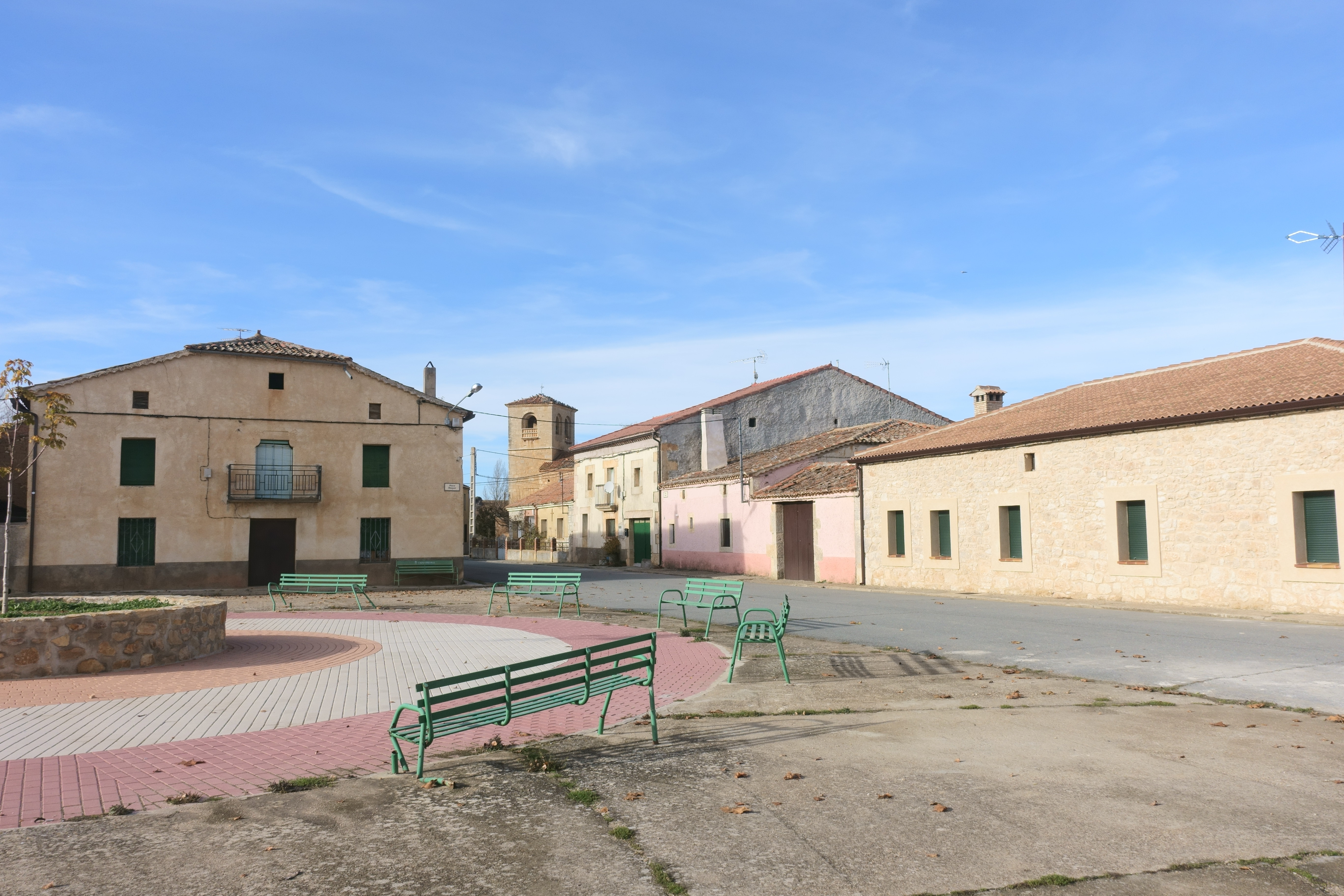
- Main Square of Riaguas de San Bartolomé

- Location in Spain. Riaguas de San Bartolomé (Spain)
- Coordinates: 41°25′36″N 3°29′23″W
- Country: Spain
- Autonomous community: Castile and León
- Province: Segovia
- Municipality: Riaguas de San Bartolomé

Area
  - Total: 11 km^{2} (4.2 sq mi)

Population (2025-01-01)
  - Total: 28
  - Density: 2.5/km^{2} (6.6/sq mi)
- Time zone: UTC+1 (CET)
  - Summer (DST): UTC+2 (CEST)
- Website: Official website

Riaguas de San Bartolomé is a municipality located in the province of Segovia, Castile and León, Spain. According to the 2004 census (INE), the municipality has a population of 81 inhabitants.
