= Diego Ramirez (artist) =

Mexican/Australian artist and writer

Diego Ramírez (born 1989) is a Mexican/Australian artist and writer working across different mediums. Born in Guadalajara, Mexico he relocated to Melbourne, Australia in 2008.

== Career ==
He graduated with a Bachelor of Fine Arts (Media Arts) from RMIT University and an Honours degree of Fine Arts from Monash University.

He has shown locally at ACCA, ACMI, NGV, Gertrude Glasshouse, Westspace, Sydney Contemporary, Blakdot and internationally at Deslave (Mexico), Human Resources (US), Torrance Art Museum (US), Art Central (HK), and Careof (IT). He has curated at Gertrude Contemporary, Seventh Gallery and Dogmilk Films. Ramírez has written locally for Art Gallery of Western Australia, Art and Australia, Disclaimer, MEMO, un Projects and internationally with NECSUS (NL) and BLUE journal (US x FR). He was the director of Seventh Gallery (2018-2023) and sat many assessment panels for local, state and federal funding bodies.

He writes cultural commentary in the area of creative nonfiction.

Ramirez is represented in Melbourne by [MARS] Gallery.
