= Luis Gutiérrez Martín =

Spanish Roman Catholic bishop (1931–2016)

Luis Gutiérrez Martín CMF
- Bishop of Segovia
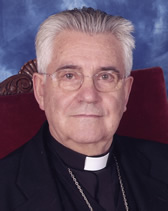
- Church: Catholic Church
- Diocese: Diocese of Segovia
- In office: 12 May 1995 – 3 November 2007
- Predecessor: Antonio Palenzuela
- Successor: Ángel Rubio Castro
- Previous posts: Titular Bishop of Tisedi (1988-1995); Auxiliary Bishop of Madrid (1988-1995)

Orders
- Ordination: 8 September 1957
- Consecration: 23 October 1988 by Ángel Suquía Goicoechea

Personal details
- Born: 26 November 1931 Navalmanzano, Province of Segovia, Spanish Republic
- Died: 22 June 2016 (aged 84)
- Coat of arms: Luis Gutiérrez Martín's coat of arms

Luis Gutiérrez Martín (26 November 1931 – 22 June 2016) was a Roman Catholic bishop.

Ordained to the priesthood in 1957, Gutiérrez Martín was appointed auxiliary bishop in 1988 of the Roman Catholic Archdiocese of Madrid, Spain. He then served as bishop of the Roman Catholic Diocese of Segovia from 1995 to 2007.
