= Luis Almarcha Hernández =

Spanish cleric and politician

Luis Almarcha Hernández

Luis Almarcha Hernández (October 14, 1887 – December 17, 1974) was a Spanish cleric and politician, and a bishop of León from 1944 to 1970. He also served as procurator in the Cortes during the Francoist regime.

== Life ==
Hernández was born at Orihuela, in the province of Alicante.

He began his ecclesiastical studies at the local Diocesan Seminary at the age of eleven, studying humanities, philosophy, and theology, and ten years later, in 1908, he moved to Rome, where he obtained his doctorate in canon law at the Gregorian University. He was ordained a priest on July 17, 1910, and on his return to Orihuela two years later, became a canon priest at the cathedral there. He was named professor of the seminary there and Prefect of Discipline. In 1923, he was named cantor of the cathedral, and in 1924, general vicar of the diocese.

Almarcha became an important figure in the diocese before and during the time of the Second Spanish Republic because the bishop of the diocese, Javier Irastorza, was frequently absent. In 1914, Almarcha founded the Syndicate of Catholic Workers of Our Lord Jesus (Sindicato de Obreros Católicos de Nuestro Padre Jesús), and 5 years later, founded the Federation of Agricultural Catholic Syndicates of Vega Baja del Segura (Federación de Sindicatos Agrícolas Católicos de la Vega Baja del Segura).

He served as an advisor to the bank Caja de Ahorros de Nuestra Señora de Monserrate and founded the Catholic Circle of Saint Joseph for Workers (Círculo Católico de San José para Obreros), which later became the Social Catholic House of Orihuela (Casa Social Católica de Orihuela), and in 1933, founded the Social Institute (Instituto Social). He served as editor from 1914 of the magazine La Lectura Popular, and also of El Pueblo (from 1931).

At the outbreak of the Spanish Civil War, he was incarcerated in Barcelona for a year, but he managed to escape to France. At the end of the war, he returned to Spain and was named procurator in the Cortes, representing the National Delegation of Syndicates from 1943–46, and was designated a member of the Royal Council (Consejo del Reino) by Francisco Franco, on which he served from 1946 to 1977. He participated in the drafting of many laws, including laws concerning university teaching and aid to large families, and also served as National Ecclesiastical Assessor of Syndicates from 1948. During his tenure, the church of San Juan y San Pedro de Renueva was built in the city by will of Hernández.

He also served as advisor to Casa de León in Madrid, honorary president of the Caja Rural Cooperativa Agrícola Católica de Aspe, honorary advisor of the Instituto Nacional de Previsión de León, president of the Junta Nacional de Arte Sacro, assistant to the Solio Pontificio, honorary advisor of the Consejo Superior de Investigaciones Científicas. Among his awards were the Cross of San Raimundo de Peñafort, the Great Cross of the Order of Cisneros, the Great Cross of the Civil Order of Alfonso X the Wise, the Great Cross of Isabella the Catholic and the Medal of Honor of the Academia Real de Bellas Artes de San Fernando.

Pius XII named him bishop of León on July 10, 1944, and Almarcha was consecrated on October 29 of the same year, occupying this post until April 4, 1970, when he resigned for reasons of health. He participated in all of the sessions of the Second Vatican Council, involving himself in discussions concerning sacred art, social doctrine, and educating priests. He made five pastoral visits to his diocese, and in the diocese he organized the Sixth National Eucharistic Congress, the first and second National Week of Sacred Art, the Isidorian Year (Año Isidoriano), and the eleventh centenary of Coyoanza, and a diocesan synod.

He founded the in León the Centro de Estudios e Investigaciones “San Isidoro” and the Escuela Superior de Arte Sacro, organizing a major restoration of ancient artwork in the diocese.

He founded a cooperative of Casas Baratas in the neighborhood of San José de las Ventas in León, and later the Cajas de Pobres.

== Works ==
He wrote numerous works including La cooperación como sistema económico social (1944), La empresa cooperativa (1959). His complete works were Publisher in 1970 as Escritos del Excmo. y Rvdmo. Sr. D. Luis Almarcha Hernández, Obispo de León. A posthumous publication was his Mi cautiverio en el dominio rojo (19 de julio de 1936 a 25 de julio de 1937) (León, 1994), which details his time as a prisoner in Barcelona.
