= Battle of Candespina =

12th-century battle in the Kingdom of León

Coordinates: 41°22′N 3°30′W

- Part of Leonese Civil War
Date	26 October 1110
Location	Fresno de Cantespino, Spain
Result	Aragonese-Portuguese victory

Belligerents
Crown of Aragon; County of Portugal	Kingdom of León

Commanders and leaders
Alfonso the Battler; Henry, Count of Portugal	Pedro González de Lara; Gómez González †

Strength
Unknown	Unknown

The Battle of Candespina was fought on 26 October 1110 or 1111 between the forces of Alfonso I of Aragon and those of his estranged wife, Urraca of León and Castile, in the Campo de la Espina near Sepúlveda. Alfonso was victorious, as he would be again in a few weeks at the Battle of Viadangos.

The battle was the result of a power struggle between Alfonso and Urraca. Perhaps the latter had become too powerful, for one of her strongest vassals, her brother-in-law Henry of Portugal, who had been recruiting soldiers in France (probably his native Burgundy), returned to ally with Alfonso after being promised a partition of the united realm that would leave him in control of the west (Galicia and Portugal).

Battle was joined while Urraca was staying in Burgos, the capital of Castile. On the field Urraca's suitor, Gómez González, Count of Castile, was killed by Henry. After the battle Urraca was joined in Burgos by the Castilian count Pedro González de Lara. Meanwhile, Henry of Portugal may have had second thoughts about his alliance with Alfonso. After the battle he was approached by some men of Urraca at Sepúlveda, where they offered him a better partition if he joined the queen. The Portuguese count's volte-face was leaked quickly, however, and the Aragonese forces retreated to Peñafiel. That "nearly impregnable fortress" was immediately besieged, unsuccessfully, by Henry and Urraca.

The date of the battle is reported differently in the early sources. The early narrative source called the Historia Compostelana gives the year as 1110. In support of this, Luiz Gonzaga de Azevedo chronicled the career of Henry of Portugal, placing his trip to France in the early spring of 1110. He also cites the disappearance of Gómez González after 15 October 1110, the last time he appears in a contemporary document, and the appearance of a new Count of Castile, Rodrigo Múñoz, in a document of Sahagún. The short account of the battle in the Annales Complutenses reads:

Era MCXLVIIII, VII kal. novembr. rex Adefonsus aragonensis et comes Enricus occiderunt comitem domno Gomez in campo de Spina.	Era 1149 [AD 1111], 7th Kalends of November [26 October]. King Alfonso of Aragon and count Henry killed count Don Gómez in the field of Spina.

The even shorter account in the Annales Compostellani reads: Era MCXLIX occiderunt comitem Gometium ("Era 1149 they killed count Gómez").
