= Fresno de Cantespino =

- Municipality
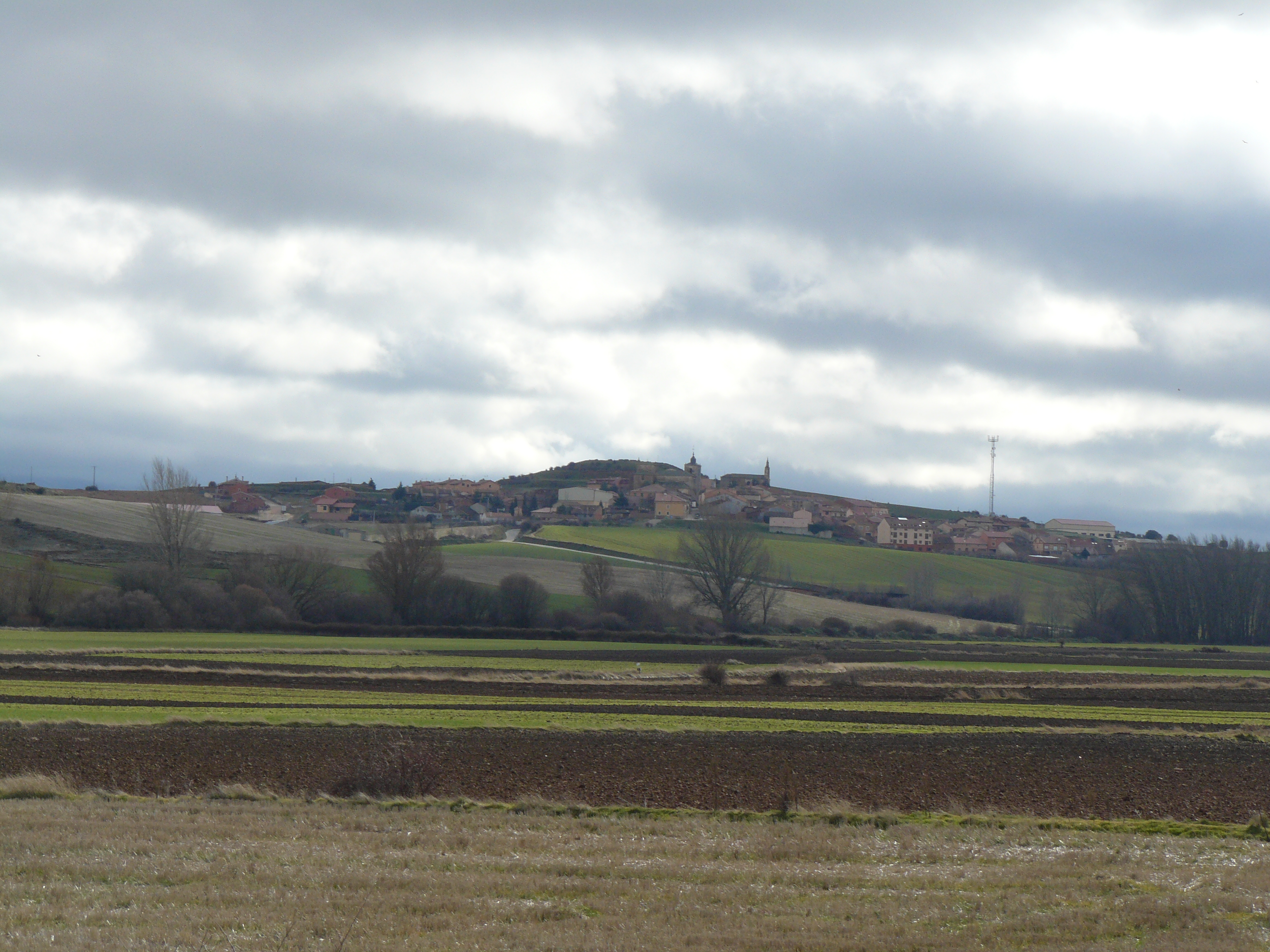

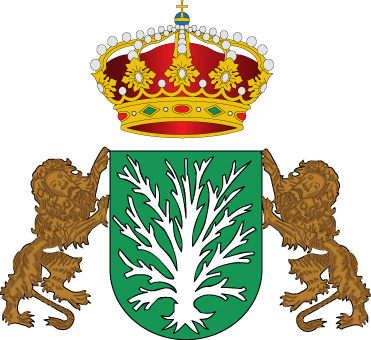
- Flag Coat of arms

- Location in Spain. Fresno de Cantespino (Spain)
- Coordinates: 41°22′10″N 3°29′50″W
- Country: Spain
- Autonomous community: Castile and León
- Province: Segovia
- Municipality: Fresno de Cantespino

Area
  - Total: 63.33 km^{2} (24.45 sq mi)
- Elevation: 1,037 m (3,402 ft)

Population (2025-01-01)
  - Total: 290
  - Density: 4.6/km^{2} (12/sq mi)
- Time zone: UTC+1 (CET)
  - Summer (DST): UTC+2 (CEST)
- Website: Official website

Fresno de Cantespino is a municipality located in the province of Segovia, Castile and León, Spain. According to the 2004 census (INE), the municipality had a population of 290.

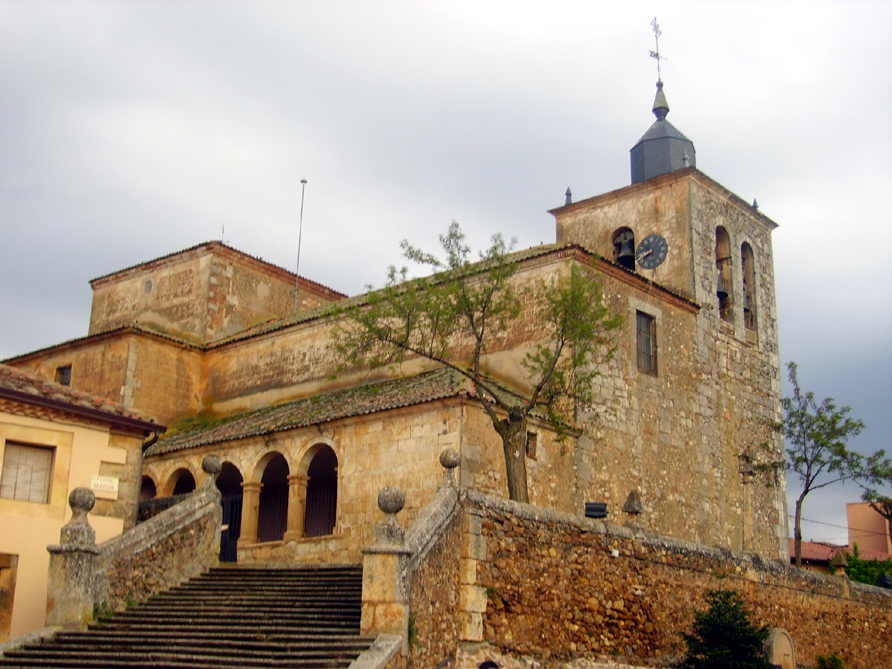
Iglesia de San Nicolás de Bari, of Roman origin.

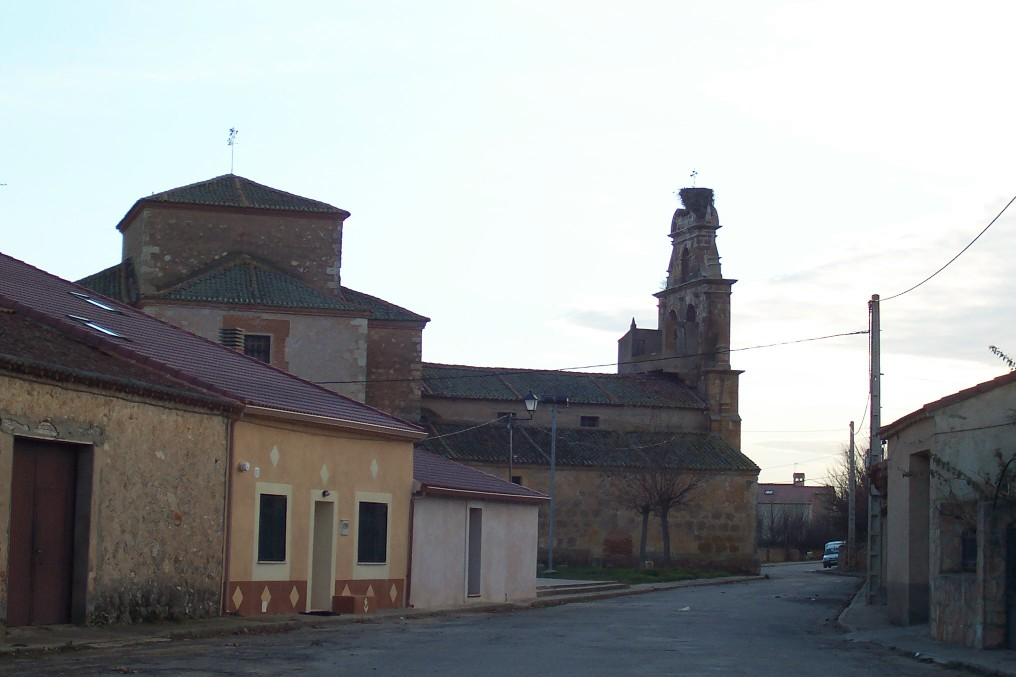
Iglesia de Cascajares, built in the 16th century.

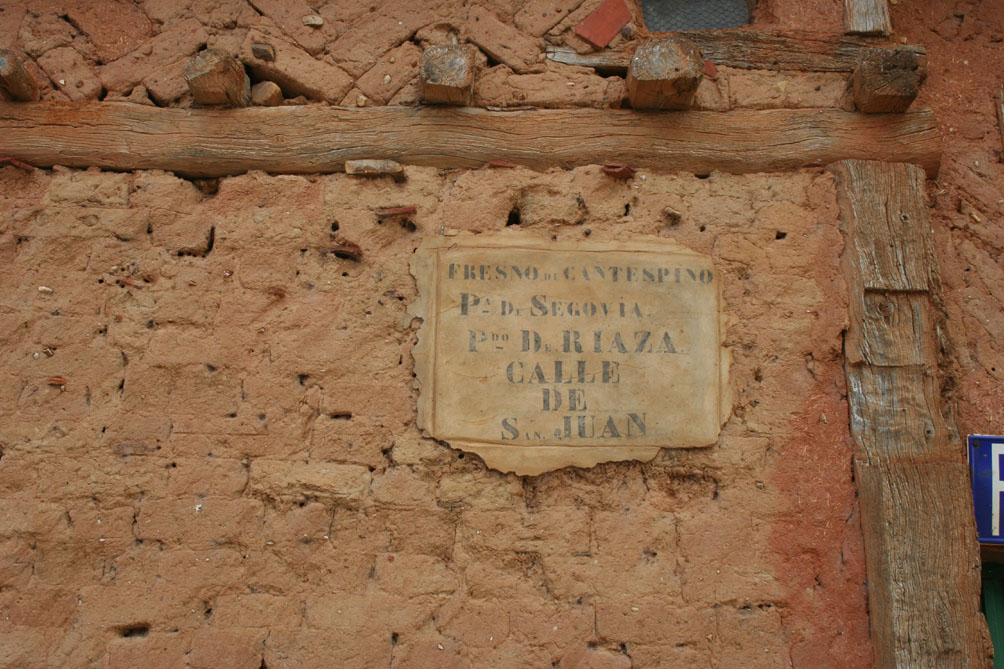
Ancient street's poster
