= Rodrigo Vázquez =

Rodrigo Vázquez may refer to:

- Rodrigo Vázquez (bishop)
- Rodrigo Vázquez (TV presenter)
- Rodrigo Vázquez de Arce, Spanish statesman and jurist
