= Luis Suárez (bishop) =

Spanish Catholic bishop

Most Reverend Luis Suárez
- Church: Catholic Church
- Diocese: Diocese of Dragonara
- In office: 1554–1580?
- Predecessor: Alfonso de Valdecabras
- Successor: None
- Previous post: Auxiliary Bishop of Toledo (1539-1554)

Orders
- Consecration: 1539 by Juan Pardo de Tavera

Personal details
- Born: Toledo, Spain

Luis Suárez or Ludovicus Suarez was a Roman Catholic prelate who served as Bishop of Dragonara (1554–1580?) and Auxiliary Bishop of Toledo (1539–1554).

== Biography ==
Luis Suárez was born in Toledo, Spain. In 1539, he was appointed during the papacy of Pope Paul III as Auxiliary Bishop of Toledo and consecrated bishop by Cardinal Juan Pardo de Tavera, Archbishop of Toledo. On 1 October 1554, he was appointed, with the recommendation of Cardinal Pardo de Tavera, during the papacy of Pope Julius III as Bishop of Dragonara. It is uncertain how long he served although he is named as the diocese's last bishop. The diocese was suppressed in 1580. Some sources state that he was from Burgos, where he became Mercedarian friar, and that he was promoted to the Diocese of Alghero on Sardinia, where he died. While bishop, he was the principal co-consecrator of Francisco Delgado López, Bishop of Lugo (1562).

Catholic Church titles
Preceded by Alfonso de Valdecabras	Bishop of Dragonara; 1554–1562?	Succeeded by None
