= EANS =

EANS may refer to:

- Alonso Eans (fl. 1285), Galician clergyman
- Emergency Action Notification System
- Estonian Air Navigation Services
- Empire Air Navigation School of the RAF

== See also ==
- EAN (disambiguation)
