= Juan Carvajal =

Juan Carvajal may refer to:

- Juan de Carvajal (cardinal) (c. 1400–1469), Spanish cardinal
- Juan Carvajal (footballer) (born 1986), Chilean footballer
- Juan de Carvajal (fl. 16th century), Spanish conquistador
- Juan Suárez Carvajal (1485–1584), Spanish Roman Catholic bishop of Lugo 1539–1561
