= Francisco Delgado López =

Francisco Delgado López may refer to:

- Francisco Delgado López (bishop) (1514–1576), Spanish Roman Catholic bishop
- Francisco "Paco" Delgado López or Paco Delgado, Canarian costume designer
