= Fernan Peres do Paramo =

Galician clergyman

Fernan Peres do Paramo was a medieval Galician clergyman.

Catholic Church titles
Preceded by Arias Soga	Bishop of Lugo; 1286–1294	Succeeded by Arias de Medin
