= Francisco Mendoza =

Francisco Mendoza may refer to:

- Francisco Mendoza (footballer) (born 1985), Mexican footballer
- Francisco Mendoza (bishop of Jaén) (died 1543), Spanish Roman Catholic bishop
- Francisco Mendoza (bishop of Palencia) (died 1536), Spanish Roman Catholic bishop
- Francisco Sarmiento Mendoza (1525-1595), Spanish canon lawyer and bishop
