= Martín Tristán Calvete =

Spanish Roman Catholic prelate

Most Reverend Martín Tristán Calvete
- Bishop of Oviedo
- Church: Catholic Church
- Diocese: Diocese of Oviedo
- In office: 1539–1546
- Predecessor: Fernando Valdés
- Successor: Cristóbal Rojas Sandoval
- Previous post: Bishop of Lugo (1534–1539)

Personal details
- Died: 1546 Oviedo, Spain

Martín Tristán Calvete (died 1546) was a Roman Catholic prelate who served as Bishop of Oviedo (1539–1546) and Bishop of Lugo (1534–1539).

== Biography ==
On 8 June 1534, Martín Tristán Calvete was appointed during the papacy of Pope Clement VII as Bishop of Lugo. On 30 May 1539, he was appointed during the papacy of Pope Paul III as Bishop of Oviedo. He served as Bishop of Oviedo until his death in 1546.

== External links and additional sources ==
- Cheney, David M. "Metropolitan Archdiocese of Oviedo". Catholic-Hierarchy.org. (for Chronology of Bishops) ^{[self-published]}
- Chow, Gabriel. "Archdiocese of Oviedo (Spain)". GCatholic.org. (for Chronology of Bishops) ^{[self-published]}
- Cheney, David M. "Diocese of Lugo". Catholic-Hierarchy.org. (for Chronology of Bishops) ^{[self-published]}
- Chow, Gabriel. "Diocese of Lugo (Spain)". GCatholic.org. (for Chronology of Bishops) ^{[self-published]}

Catholic Church titles
Preceded by Pedro Ribera	Bishop of Lugo; 1534–1539	Succeeded by Juan Suárez Carvajal
Preceded by Fernando Valdés	Bishop of Oviedo; 1539–1546	Succeeded by Cristóbal Rojas Sandoval
