= Bernardino de Carmona =

Spanish Roman Catholic prelate

Most Reverend Bernardino de Carmona
- Auxiliary Bishop of Santiago de Compostela; Titular Bishop of Soltania
- Church: Catholic Church
- Archdiocese: Archdiocese of Santiago de Compostela
- In office: 1551–1553

Orders
- Consecration: 5 February 1553 by Juan Suárez Carvajal

Bernardino de Carmona was a Roman Catholic prelate who served as Titular Bishop of Soltania (1551–1553) and Auxiliary Bishop of Santiago de Compostela (1551–1553).

== Biography ==
On 10 July 1551, Bernardino de Carmona was selected by the King of Spain and confirmed by Pope Julius III as Auxiliary Bishop of Santiago de Compostela and titular bishop of Soltania. On 5 February 1553 he was consecrated bishop by Juan Suárez Carvajal, Bishop of Lugo, with Vasco de Quiroga, Bishop of Michoacán, and Tomás de San Martín, Bishop of La Plata o Charcas, serving as co-consecrators.

== External links and additional sources ==
- Cheney, David M. "Archdiocese of Santiago de Compostela". Catholic-Hierarchy.org. (for Chronology of Bishops) ^{[self-published]}
- Chow, Gabriel. "Archdiocese of Santiago de Compostela (Spain)". GCatholic.org. (for Chronology of Bishops) ^{[self-published]}
