= Juan Ruiz (disambiguation) =

Juan Ruiz (c. 1283 – c. 1350), known as "the Archpriest of Hita", was a medieval Castilian poet.

Juan Ruiz may also refer to:

- Juan Ruiz de Alarcón (c. 1581 – 1639), writer in New Spain
- Juan Ruiz Anchía (born 1949), Spanish cinematographer
- Juan Ruiz de Apodaca, 1st Count of Venadito (1754–1835), Spanish naval officer and viceroy of New Spain
- Juan Ruiz Casaux (1889–1972), Spanish cellist
- Juan Ruiz de Colmenero (1596–1663), Spanish prelate of the Roman Catholic Church who served in New Spain
- Juan Ruiz Healy, Mexican journalist
- Juan Ruiz de Medina (died 1507), Spanish prelate of the Roman Catholic Church
- Juan Ruiz Olazarán (1901–1996), Spanish politician, president of the Interprovincial Council of Santander, Palencia and Burgos during the Civil War
- Juan Ruiz de Villarán (died 1591), Spanish prelate of the Roman Catholic Church
- Juan Diego Ruiz Moreno (1942–2022), known professionally as Juan Diego, Spanish actor
