= García de Loaysa =

Catholic cardinal

His Eminence García de Loaysa
- Archbishop of Seville
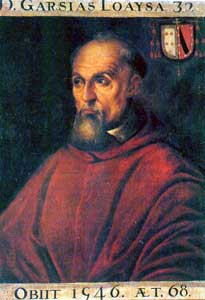
- Church: Catholic Church
- Archdiocese: Seville
- Appointed: 23 May 1539
- Term ended: 22 April 1546
- Predecessor: Alonso Manrique de Lara
- Successor: Fernando de Valdés y Salas
- Other posts: Cardinal-Priest of Santa Susanna (1530-1546); Grand Inquisitor of Spain (1546)
- Previous posts: Bishop of Osma (1524-1532); Bishop of Sigüenza (1532-1539)

Orders
- Consecration: 8 June 1524
- Created cardinal: 16 May 1530 by Pope Clement VII
- Rank: Cardinal-Priest

Personal details
- Born: Juan García de Loaysa y Mendoza; 1478 Talavera de la Reina, Spain
- Died: 22 April 1546 (aged 67–68) Madrid, Spain
- Buried: San Pietro in Montorio

Juan García de Loaysa y Mendoza (1478 in Talavera de la Reina, Kingdom of Toledo, Crown of Castile – 22 April 1546 in Madrid, Spain) was a Spanish Archbishop of Seville and Cardinal.

== Biography ==
His parents were nobles; at a very early age he entered the Dominican Order at St Steven’s Priory, Salamanca. Its severe discipline, however, affected his delicate constitution and he was transferred to the convent of St. Paul in Peñafiel where he was professed in 1495.

On the completion of his studies in Alcalá, and later at the Colegio de San Gregorio of Valladolid University, he taught philosophy and theology. About the same time he was appointed regent of studies and for two terms filled the office of rector in San Gregorio College. In 1518 he represented his province at the general chapter held at Rome where by unanimous vote he gained the generalship of the Dominican Order in succession to Cardinal Thomas Cajetan, a position he held until 1524.

After visiting the Dominican houses in Sicily and other countries, he returned to Spain. There he made the acquaintance of Charles V, Holy Roman Emperor who chose him for his confessor and later, with papal sanction, offered him the See of Osma, for which he was consecrated on 8 June 1524. Subsequently, he held several offices of political importance, such as President of the Council of the Indies. In that capacity he was a proponent of the Dominican line of thought and the New Laws of 1542 protecting the Native Americans; they were however revoked in 1545.

On 16 May 1530 Pope Clement VII created him cardinal and transferred him to the See of Sigüenza, where he became bishop on 23 February 1532. He was made Archbishop of Seville on 23 May 1539, and became Grand Inquisitor in 1546, the year of his death.

== Legacy ==
His writings are limited to a few pastoral letters. G. Haine found, in the royal library at Simancas, Garcia's letters to Charles V written in the years 1530–32, of interest for the history of the Protestant Reformation as well as for the religious and political history of Spain during that period.

== Notes ==
Catholic Church titles
| Preceded by Thomas Cajetan | Master of the Order of Preachers; 1518–1524 | Succeeded by Francesco Silvestri |
| Preceded by Juan Pardo de Tavera | Bishop of Osma; 1524–1532 | Succeeded by Pedro González Manso |
| Preceded by Fadrique de Portugal | Bishop of Siguenza; 1532–1539 | Succeeded by Fernando de Valdés Salas |
| Preceded by Alfonso Manrique de Lara | Archbishop of Seville; 1539–1546 | Succeeded by Fernando de Valdés Salas |
| Preceded by Juan Pardo de Tavera | Grand Inquisitor of Spain; 1546 | Succeeded by Fernando de Valdés y Salas |
