= Cristóbal Rojas Sandoval =

Spanish Roman Catholic prelate (1502–1580)

Most Reverend Cristóbal Rojas Sandoval
- Archbishop of Seville
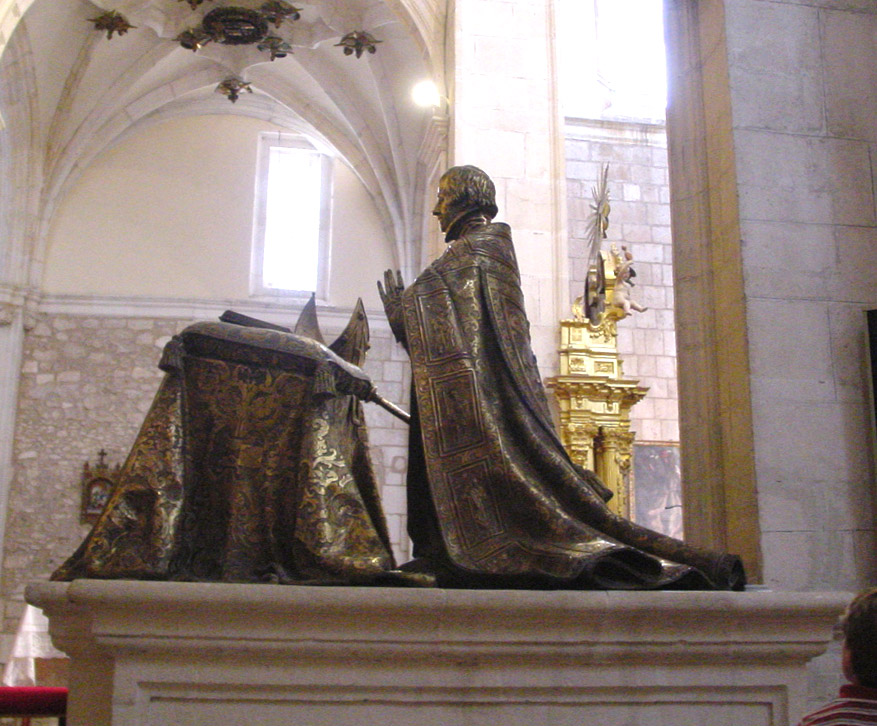
- Statute of Cristóbal Rojas Sandoval by Juan de Arphe y Villafañe
- Church: Catholic Church
- Archdiocese: Archdiocese of Seville
- In office: 1556–1562
- Predecessor: Gaspar de Zúñiga y Avellaneda
- Successor: Rodrigo de Castro Osorio
- Previous posts: Bishop of Oviedo (1546–1556); Bishop of Badajoz (1556–1562); Bishop of Córdoba (1562–1571)

Personal details
- Born: 26 June 1502 Fuenterrabía, Spain
- Died: 22 September 1580 (age 78) Cigalles, Spain

Cristóbal Rojas Sandoval (26 June 1502 – 22 September 1580) was a Roman Catholic prelate who served as Archbishop of Seville (1571–1580), Bishop of Córdoba (1562–1571), Bishop of Badajoz (1556–1562), and Bishop of Oviedo (1546–1556).

== Biography ==
Cristóbal Rojas Sandoval was born in Fuenterrabía, Spain. On 8 October 1546, he was appointed by the King of Spain and confirmed by Pope Paul III as Bishop of Oviedo. On 4 May 1556, he was appointed by Pope Paul IV as Bishop of Badajoz. On 27 May 1562, he was appointed by Pope Pius IV as Bishop of Córdoba. On 18 May 1571, he was appointed by Pope Pius V as Archbishop of Seville where he served until his death on 22 September 1580 in Cigalles, Spain.

== Episcopal succession ==
While bishop, he was the principal consecrator of:

- Manuel de Mercado Aldrete, Bishop of Puerto Rico (1571);
- Diego de Landa, Bishop of Yucatán (1573);
- Sebastián Ocando, Bishop of Santa Marta (1579); and
- Toribio Alfonso de Mogrovejo, Archbishop of Lima (1580).

== External links and additional sources ==
- Cheney, David M. "Metropolitan Archdiocese of Oviedo". Catholic-Hierarchy.org. (for Chronology of Bishops) ^{[self-published]}
- Chow, Gabriel. "Archdiocese of Oviedo (Spain)". GCatholic.org. (for Chronology of Bishops) ^{[self-published]}
- Cheney, David M. "Archdiocese of Mérida–Badajoz". Catholic-Hierarchy.org. (for Chronology of Bishops) ^{[self-published]}
- Chow, Gabriel. "Metropolitan Archdiocese of Mérida–Badajoz (Spain)". GCatholic.org. (for Chronology of Bishops) ^{[self-published]}
- Cheney, David M. "Archdiocese of Sevilla {Seville}". Catholic-Hierarchy.org. (for Chronology of Bishops) ^{[self-published]}
- Chow, Gabriel. "Metropolitan Archdiocese of Sevilla (Italy)". GCatholic.org. (for Chronology of Bishops) ^{[self-published]}
- Cheney, David M. "Diocese of Córdoba". Catholic-Hierarchy.org. (for Chronology of Bishops) ^{[self-published]}
- Chow, Gabriel. "Diocese of Córdoba (Spain)". GCatholic.org. (for Chronology of Bishops) ^{[self-published]}

Catholic Church titles
| Preceded by Martín Tristán Calvete | Bishop of Oviedo; 1546–1556 | Succeeded by Jerónimo Velasco |
| Preceded by Francisco de Navarra y Hualde | Bishop of Badajoz; 1556–1562 | Succeeded by Juan de Ribera |
| Preceded by Diego Alava Esquivel | Bishop of Córdoba; 1562–1571 | Succeeded by Bernardo de Fresneda |
| Preceded by Gaspar de Zúñiga y Avellaneda | Archbishop of Seville; 1571–1580 | Succeeded by Rodrigo de Castro Osorio |
