= Diego de los Cobos Molina =

Spanish Roman Catholic prelate

Most Reverend Diego de los Cobos Molina
- Bishop of Jaén
- Church: Catholic Church
- Diocese: Diocese of Jaén
- In office: 1560–1565
- Predecessor: Diego Tavera Ponce de Léon
- Successor: Francisco Delgado López
- Previous post: Bishop of Ávila (1559–1560)

Personal details
- Born: Úbeda, Spain
- Died: 8 September 1565 Toledo, Spain

Diego de los Cobos Molina (died 1565) was a Roman Catholic prelate who served as Bishop of Jaén (1560–1565) and Bishop of Ávila (1559–1560).

== Biography ==
Diego de los Cobos Molina was born in Ubeda, Spain, around 1516. He was the brother of Secretary of State Juan Vázquez de Molina and the nephew of Francisco de los Cobos.
On 2 August 1559, he was appointed during the papacy of Pope Paul IV as Bishop of Ávila. On 4 September 1560, he was appointed during the papacy of Pope Pius IV as Bishop of Jaén. He served as Bishop of Jaén until his death in Toledo, Spain on 8 September 1565.

While bishop, he was the principal co-consecrator of Diego de Covarrubias y Leiva, Archbishop of Santo Domingo (1560).

== External links and additional sources ==
- Cheney, David M. "Diocese of Ávila". Catholic-Hierarchy.org. (for Chronology of Bishops) ^{[self-published]}
- Chow, Gabriel. "Diocese of Ávila". GCatholic.org. (for Chronology of Bishops) ^{[self-published]}
- Cheney, David M. "Diocese of Jaén". Catholic-Hierarchy.org. (for Chronology of Bishops)^{self-published}
- Chow, Gabriel. "Diocese of Jaén". GCatholic.org. (for Chronology of Bishops)^{self-published}

Catholic Church titles
Preceded by Diego Alava Esquivel	Bishop of Ávila; 1559–1560	Succeeded by Alvaro Hurtado de Mendoza y Sarmiento
Preceded by Diego Tavera Ponce de Léon	Bishop of Jaén; 1560–1565	Succeeded by Francisco Delgado López
