= Ean =

Ean may refer to:

== People ==
- Ean Campbell (1856–1921), Scottish Anglican cleric, bishop of Glasgow and Galloway
- Ean Elliot Clevenger, American multi-instrumentalist, vocalist, and songwriter
- Ean Evans (1960–2009), bassist for Lynyrd Skynyrd from 2001 until his death
- Ean Randolph (born 1984), American and Canadian football wide receiver

== Other uses ==
- Enterprise Mobility, the parent company of rental car brands Enterprise Rent-A-Car, Alamo Rent a Car and National Car Rental
- National Emergency Message, known until 2022 as an Emergency Action Notification (SAME code: EAN), the national activation of the Emergency Alert System in the United States
- Ethylammonium nitrate, a salt with formula C_{2}H_{8}N_{2}O_{3}
- European Academy of Neurology, a non-profit organisation
- European Article Number also known as International Article Number, a standard describing a barcode symbology and numbering system
- European Aviation Network, a hybrid terrestrial and satellite aviation network
- Skypower Express Airways (ICAO code: EAN), an airline based in Kaduna in Nigeria
