= Gaspar de Zúñiga y Avellaneda =

Spanish cardinal and bishop

His Eminence Gaspar de Zúñiga y Avellaneda
- Archbishop of Seville
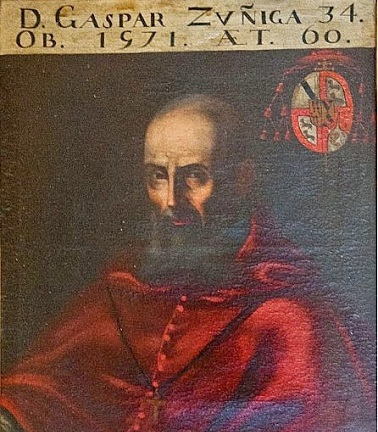
- Portrait of Cardinal Zúñiga, 19th century
- Church: Catholic Church
- Archdiocese: Seville
- Appointed: 22 June 1569
- Term ended: 2 January 1571
- Predecessor: Fernando de Valdés y Salas
- Successor: Cristóbal Rojas Sandoval
- Other posts: Cardinal-Priest of Santa Barbara dei Librai (1570-1571)
- Previous posts: See list: Bishop of Segovia (1550–1558); Archbishop of Santiago de Compostela (1558-1569)

Orders
- Created cardinal: 17 May 1570 by Pope Pius V
- Rank: Cardinal-Priest

Personal details
- Born: 1507 Cáceres, Spain
- Died: 2 January 1571 (aged 63–64) Jaén, Spain
- Buried: Seville Cathedral
- Coat of arms

Gaspar de Zúñiga y Avellaneda (1507 – 2 January 1571) was a Spanish Roman Catholic cardinal and bishop.

== Biography ==
A member of the House of Zúñiga, Gaspar de Zúñiga y Avellaneda was born in Cáceres, Spain, the son of Francisco de Zúñiga, 3rd count of Miranda del Castañar, and María de Cárdenas y Henríquez. His father's brother was Cardinal Íñigo López de Mendoza y Zúñiga.

He attended the University of Salamanca, where he studied Christian theology under Francisco de Vitoria. After he was ordained as a priest, he served as a cleric in Osma. From 1547 to 1550, he taught theology at the University of Salamanca. He became Abbot of Castro (near Burgos) and of San Isidoro.

On 27 June 1550 he was elected Bishop of Segovia and was subsequently consecrated as a bishop. He attended the last two sessions of the Council of Trent in 1551–52. He was appointed to the commission to redact the decrees on the Mass and the sacrament of Holy Orders on 18 July 1558. He did not attend the close of the Council because he was recalled to Spain to serve as a judge at the cause of Bartolomé Carranza, Archbishop of Toledo. On 22 June 1569 he was transferred to the Archdiocese of Seville. He accompanied Francisco Diego de Zúñiga, 4th Duke of Béjar and Plasencia to the Holy Roman Empire to accompany Anna of Austria, the daughter of Maximilian II, Holy Roman Emperor, for her impending marriage to Philip II of Spain.

Pope Pius V made him a cardinal priest in the consistory of 17 May 1570. He received the red hat and the titular church of Santa Barbara on 16 June 1570.

He died in Jaén, Spain on 2 January 1571. He was buried in Seville Cathedral.

== See also ==
- Catholic Church in Spain

Catholic Church titles
Preceded by Antonio Ramírez de Haro	Bishop of Segovia; 1550–1558	Succeeded by Francisco de Santa María Benavides Velasco
Preceded by Juan Álvarez de Toledo	Archbishop of Santiago de Compostela; 1558–1569	Succeeded by Cristóbal Fernández Valtodano
Preceded by Fernando Valdés	Archbishop of Seville; 1569–1571	Succeeded by Cristóbal Rojas Sandoval
Preceded by Pierdonato Cesi (seniore)	Cardinal-Priest of Santa Barbara; 1570–1571	Succeeded by
