= Portrait of Juan Pardo de Tavera =

1609 painting by El Greco

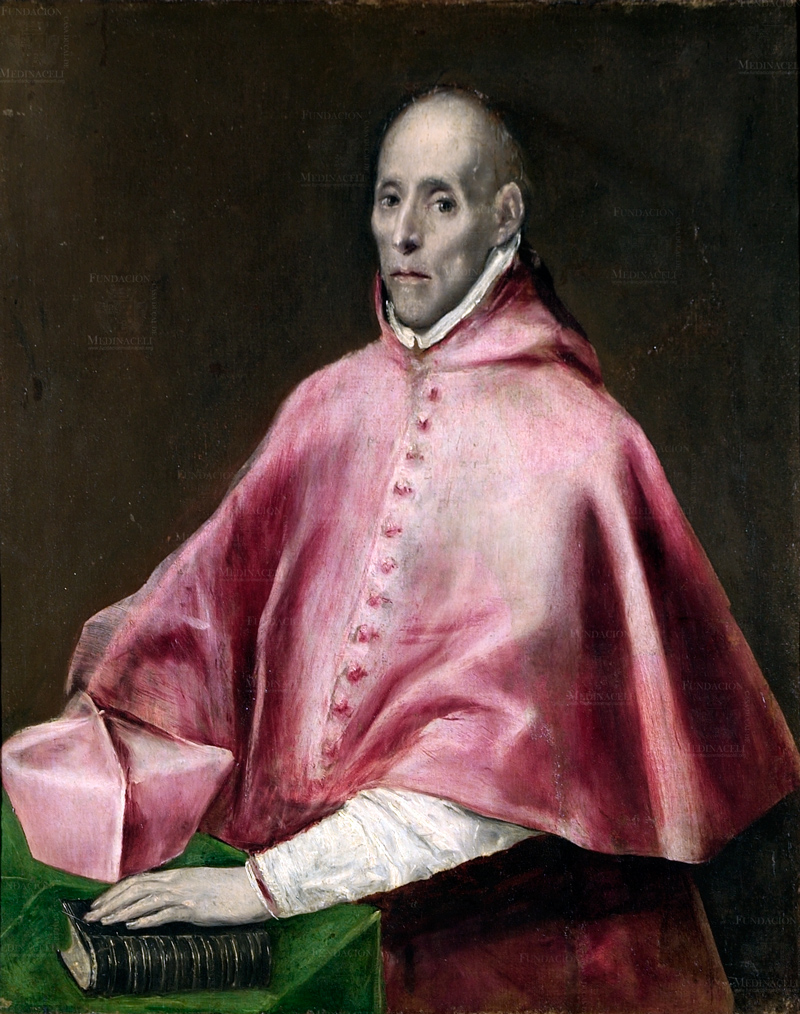
- Artist: El Greco
- Year: 1609
- Medium: oil on canvas
- Dimensions: 103 cm × 82 cm (41 in × 32 in)
- Location: Hospital de Tavera, Toledo

Portrait of Juan Pardo de Tavera is a 1609 oil on canvas painting by El Greco, now in the Hospital de Tavera in Toledo, founded by the portrait's subject. It was painted long after the 1545 death of its subject, cardinal Juan Pardo de Tavera, and so the artist modelled the cardinal's features on a funerary mask by Alonso Berruguete.

== See also ==
- List of works by El Greco

== Bibliography ==
- ÁLVAREZ LOPERA, José, El Greco, Madrid, Arlanza, 2005, Biblioteca «Descubrir el Arte», (colección «Grandes maestros»). ISBN 84-95503-44-1.
- SCHOLZ-HÄNSEL, Michael, El Greco, Colonia, Taschen, 2003. ISBN 978-3-8228-3173-1.
