= Pedro Ribera =

Roman Catholic bishop (1465–1530)

Most Reverend Pedro Ribera
- Bishop of Lugo
- Church: Catholic Church
- Diocese: Diocese of Lugo
- In office: 1500–1530
- Predecessor: Diego Ramírez de Guzmán
- Successor: Martín Tristán Calvete

Personal details
- Born: 1465 Madrigal, Spain
- Died: 1530 (age 65) Lugo, Spain

Pedro Ribera (1465–1530) was a Roman Catholic prelate who served as Bishop of Lugo (1500–1530).

== Biography ==
Pedro Ribera was born in Madrigal, Spain in 1465. On 26 June 1500, he was appointed during the papacy of Pope Alexander VI as Bishop of Lugo. He served as Bishop of Lugo until his death in 1530.

== External links and additional sources ==
- Cheney, David M. "Diocese of Lugo". Catholic-Hierarchy.org. (for Chronology of Bishops) ^{[self-published]}
- Chow, Gabriel. "Diocese of Lugo (Spain)". GCatholic.org. (for Chronology of Bishops) ^{[self-published]}

Catholic Church titles
Preceded by Diego Ramírez de Guzmán	Bishop of Lugo; 1500–1530	Succeeded by Martín Tristán Calvete
