= Pedro Castro Nero =

Spanish Roman Catholic prelate

Most Reverend Pedro Castro Nero
- Archbishop of Valencia
- Church: Catholic Church
- Archdiocese: Archdiocese of Valencia
- In office: 1611
- Predecessor: Juan de Ribera
- Successor: Isidoro Aliaga
- Previous posts: Bishop of Lugo (1599–1603); Bishop of Segovia (1603–1611)

Orders
- Consecration: 18 July 1599 by Juan Fonseca

Personal details
- Born: 1541 Ampudia, Spain
- Died: 28 September 1611 (age 70) Valencia, Spain

Pedro Castro Nero (1541 – 28 September 1611) was a Roman Catholic prelate who served as Archbishop of Valencia (1611), Bishop of Segovia (1603–1611), and Bishop of Lugo (1599–1603).

== Biography ==
Pedro Castro Nero was born in Ampudia, Spain. On 17 February 1599 he was selected by the King of Spain and confirmed by Pope Clement VIII as Bishop of Lugo. On 18 July 1599 he was consecrated bishop by Juan Fonseca, Bishop of Guadix with Sebastián Quintero Ortiz, Bishop Emeritus of Gallipoli, and Juan Pedro González de Mendoza, Bishop Emeritus of Lipari, serving as co-consecrators. On 13 August 1603 he was selected by the King of Spain and confirmed by Pope Clement VIII as Bishop of Segovia. On 12 September 1611 he was selected by the King of Spain and confirmed by Pope Paul V as Archbishop of Valencia where he served until his death 16 days later on 28 September 1611.

While bishop, he was the principal consecrator of Francisco Terrones del Caño, Bishop of Tui (1601).

== See also ==
- Catholic Church in Spain

== External links and additional sources ==
- Cheney, David M. "Diocese of Lugo". Catholic-Hierarchy.org. (for Chronology of Bishops) ^{[self-published]}
- Chow, Gabriel. "Diocese of Lugo (Spain)". GCatholic.org. (for Chronology of Bishops) ^{[self-published]}
- Cheney, David M. "Diocese of Segovia". Catholic-Hierarchy.org. (for Chronology of Bishops) ^{[self-published]}
- Chow, Gabriel. "Diocese of Segovia (Spain)". GCatholic.org. (for Chronology of Bishops) ^{[self-published]}

Catholic Church titles
Preceded by Lorenzo Asensio Otaduy Avendaño	Bishop of Lugo; 1599–1603	Succeeded by Juan García Valdemor
Preceded by Maximilian of Austria	Bishop of Segovia; 1603–1611	Succeeded by Antonio Idiáquez Manrique
Preceded by Juan de Ribera	Archbishop of Valencia; 1611	Succeeded by Isidoro Aliaga
