= Fernando Vellosillo Barrio =

Spanish Roman Catholic prelate

Most Reverend Fernando Vellosillo Barrio
- Bishop of Lugo
- Church: Catholic Church
- Diocese: Diocese of Lugo
- In office: 1567–1587
- Predecessor: Francisco Delgado López (bishop)
- Successor: Juan Ruiz de Villarán

Personal details
- Died: 18 February 1587 Lugo, Spain

Fernando Vellosillo Barrio (died 18 February 1587) was a Roman Catholic prelate who served as Bishop of Lugo (1567–1587).

On 13 January 1567, Fernando Vellosillo Barrio was appointed during the papacy of Pope Pius V as Bishop of Lugo. He served as Bishop of Lugo until his death on 18 February 1587. While bishop, he was the principal co-consecrator of Juan de Sanclemente Torquemada, Bishop of Orense (1579).

== External links and additional sources ==
- Cheney, David M. "Diocese of Lugo". Catholic-Hierarchy.org. (for Chronology of Bishops) ^{[self-published]}
- Chow, Gabriel. "Diocese of Lugo (Spain)". GCatholic.org. (for Chronology of Bishops) ^{[self-published]}

Catholic Church titles
Preceded by Francisco Delgado López (bishop)	Bishop of Lugo; 1567–1587	Succeeded by Juan Ruiz de Villarán
