= Lorenzo Asensio Otaduy Avendaño =

Roman Catholic prelate

Most Reverend Lorenzo Asensio Otaduy Avendaño
- Bishop of Ávila
- Church: Catholic Church
- In office: 1599–1611
- Predecessor: Juan Velázquez de las Cuevas
- Successor: Juan Alvarez de Caldas
- Previous post: Bishop of Lugo (1591–1599)

Orders
- Consecration: 16 February 1592 by Juan Fernández Vadillo

Personal details
- Born: 1539 Oñate, Spain
- Died: 4 December 1611 (age 72) Ávila, Spain

Lorenzo Asensio Otaduy Avendaño (1539 – 4 December 1611) was a Roman Catholic prelate who served as Bishop of Ávila (1599–1611) and Bishop of Lugo (1591–1599).

== Biography ==
Lorenzo Asensio Otaduy Avendaño was born in Oñate, Spain, in 1539. On 4 November 1591, he was appointed during the papacy of Pope Innocent IX as Bishop of Lugo. On 16 February 1592, he was consecrated bishop by Juan Fernández Vadillo, Bishop of Cuenca. On 1 February 1599, he was appointed during the papacy of Pope Clement VIII as Bishop of Ávila. He served as Bishop of Ávila until his death on 4 December 1611.

== External links and additional sources ==
- Cheney, David M. "Diocese of Lugo". Catholic-Hierarchy.org. (for Chronology of Bishops) ^{[self-published]}
- Chow, Gabriel. "Diocese of Lugo (Spain)". GCatholic.org. (for Chronology of Bishops) ^{[self-published]}
- Cheney, David M. "Diocese of Ávila". Catholic-Hierarchy.org. (for Chronology of Bishops) ^{[self-published]}
- Chow, Gabriel. "Diocese of Ávila". GCatholic.org. (for Chronology of Bishops) ^{[self-published]}

Catholic Church titles
Preceded by Juan Ruiz de Villarán	Bishop of Lugo; 1591–1599	Succeeded by Pedro Castro Nero
Preceded by Juan Velázquez de las Cuevas	Bishop of Ávila; 1599–1611	Succeeded by Juan Alvarez de Caldas
