= Arias Soga =

Galician clergyman

Arias Soga was a medieval Galician clergyman.

Catholic Church titles
Preceded by Alonso Eans	Bishop of Lugo; 1284–1286	Succeeded by Fernan Peres do Paramo
