= Rodrigo Vázquez (bishop) =

Italian Roman Catholic prelate

Most Reverend Rodrigo Vázquez
- Auxiliary Bishop of Massa Marittima
- Church: Catholic Church
- Diocese: Diocese of Massa Marittima
- In office: 1551–1562?

Orders
- Consecration: 1551 by Giovanni Giacomo Barba

Rodrigo Vázquez was a Roman Catholic prelate who served as Auxiliary Bishop of Massa Marittima (1551–1562?).

== Biography ==
On 18 February 1551, Rodrigo Vázquez was appointed during the papacy of Pope Julius III as Auxiliary Bishop of Massa Marittima and Titular Bishop of Troas. In 1551, he was consecrated bishop by Giovanni Giacomo Barba, Bishop of Teramo. While bishop, he was the principal co-consecrator of Melchor Cano, Bishop of Islas Canarias (1553); and Francisco Delgado López (bishop), Bishop of Lugo (1562).
