= Diego Tavera Ponce de Léon =

Spanish Roman Catholic prelate

Most Reverend Diego Tavera Ponce de Léon
- Bishop of Jaén
- Church: Catholic Church
- In office: 1555–1560
- Predecessor: Pedro Pacheco de Villena
- Successor: Diego de los Cobos Molina

Personal details
- Died: 28 April 1560 Jaén, Spain

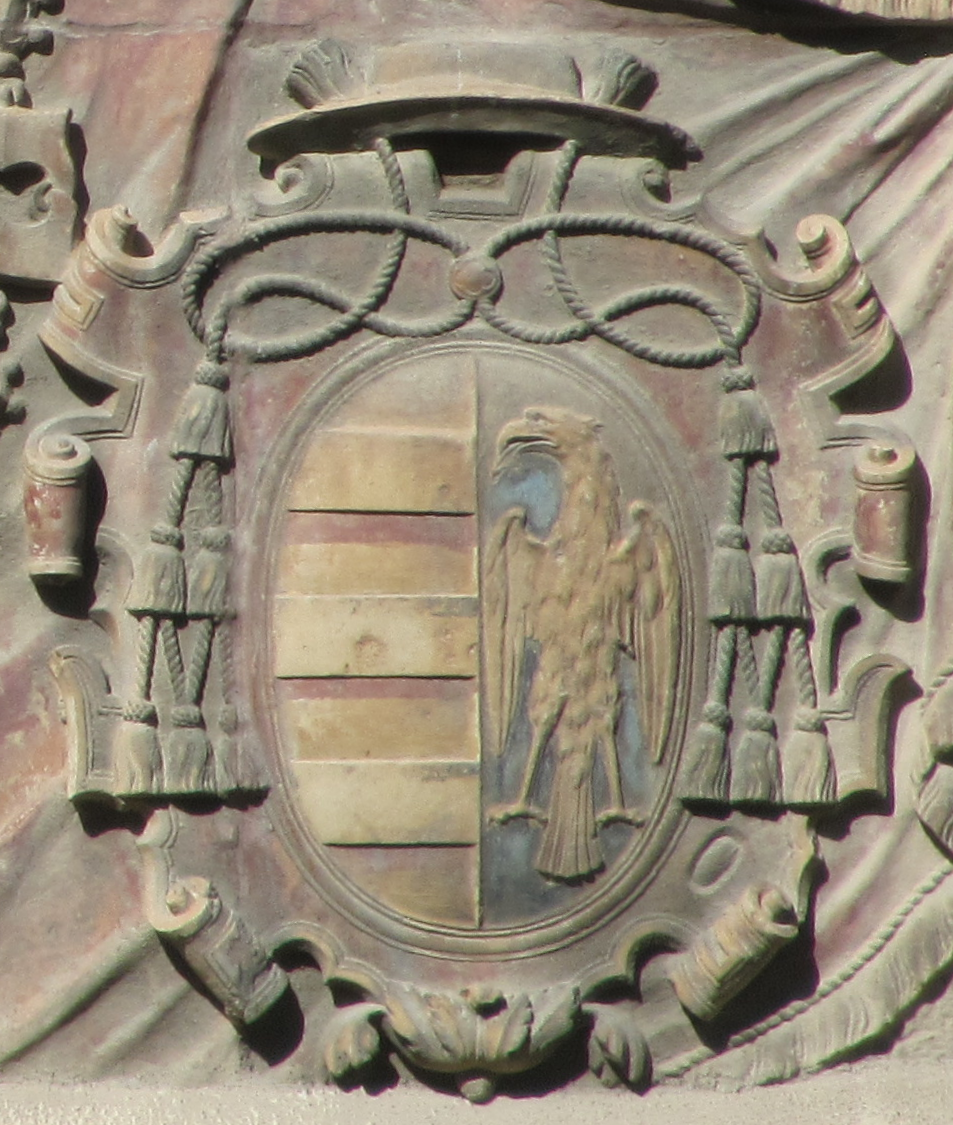

Diego Tavera Ponce de Léon (died 1560) was a Roman Catholic prelate who served as Bishop of Jaén (1555–1560).

== Biography ==
On 17 July 1555, he was appointed during the papacy of Pope Paul IV as Bishop of Jaén. He served as Bishop of Jaén until his death on 28 April 1560.

== External links and additional sources ==
- Cheney, David M. "Diocese of Jaén". Catholic-Hierarchy.org. (for Chronology of Bishops)^{self-published}
- Chow, Gabriel. "Diocese of Jaén". GCatholic.org. (for Chronology of Bishops)^{self-published}

Catholic Church titles
Preceded by Pedro Pacheco de Villena	Bishop of Jaén; 1555–1560	Succeeded by Diego de los Cobos Molina
