= Francisco Delgado López (bishop) =

Spanish Roman Catholic prelate

Most Reverend Francisco Delgado López
- Bishop of Jaén
- Church: Catholic Church
- Diocese: Diocese of Jaén
- In office: 1566–1576
- Predecessor: Diego de los Cobos Molina
- Successor: Diego Deza Tello
- Previous post: Bishop of Lugo (1561–1566)

Orders
- Consecration: 11 January 1562 by Diego Ramírez Sedeño de Fuenleal

Personal details
- Born: 1514 Villapun
- Died: 2 October 1576 (age 62) Jaén, Spain

Francisco Delgado López (1514 – 2 October 1576) was a Roman Catholic prelate who served as Bishop of Jaén (1566–1576) and Bishop of Lugo (1561–1566).

== Biography ==
Francisco Delgado López was born in Villapun in 1514. On 13 June 1561, he was appointed during the papacy of Pope Pius IV as Bishop of Lugo. On 11 January 1562, he was consecrated bishop by Diego Ramírez Sedeño de Fuenleal, Bishop of Pamplona, with Luis Suárez, Bishop of Dragonara, and Rodrigo Vázquez, Titular Bishop of Troas, serving as co-consecrators. On 26 April 1566, he was appointed during the papacy of Pope Pius V as Bishop of Jaén. He served as Bishop of Jaén until his death on 2 October 1576.

== External links and additional sources ==
- Cheney, David M. "Diocese of Lugo". Catholic-Hierarchy.org. (for Chronology of Bishops) ^{[self-published]}
- Chow, Gabriel. "Diocese of Lugo (Spain)". GCatholic.org. (for Chronology of Bishops) ^{[self-published]}
- Cheney, David M. "Diocese of Jaén". Catholic-Hierarchy.org. (for Chronology of Bishops) ^{[self-published]}
- Chow, Gabriel. "Diocese of Jaén". GCatholic.org. (for Chronology of Bishops) ^{[self-published]}

Catholic Church titles
Preceded by Juan Suárez Carvajal	Bishop of Lugo; 1561–1566	Succeeded by Fernando Vellosillo Barrio
Preceded by Diego de los Cobos Molina	Bishop of Jaén; 1566–1576	Succeeded by Diego Deza Tello
