= Diego Deza Tello =

Spanish Roman Catholic prelate (died 1579)

Most Reverend Diego Deza Tello
- Bishop of Jaén
- Church: Catholic Church
- Diocese: Diocese of Jaén
- In office: 1577–1579
- Predecessor: Francisco Delgado López
- Successor: Francisco Sarmiento Mendoza
- Previous posts: Bishop of Islas Canarias (1554–1566); Bishop of Coria (1566–1577)

Personal details
- Born: Seville, Spain
- Died: 13 September 1579 Seville, Spain

Diego Deza Tello (died 1579) was a Roman Catholic prelate who served as Bishop of Jaén (1577–1579), Bishop of Coria (1566–1577), and Bishop of Islas Canarias (1554–1566).

== Biography ==
Diego Deza Tello was born in Seville, Spain. On 30 April 1554, he was appointed during the papacy of Pope Julius III as Bishop of Islas Canarias. On 26 April 1566, he was appointed during the papacy of Pope Pius V as Bishop of Coria. On 11 September 1577, he was appointed during the papacy of Pope Gregory XIII as Bishop of Jaén. He served as Bishop of Jaén until his death on 13 September 1579 in Seville, Spain.

== External links and additional sources ==
- Cheney, David M. "Diocese of Islas Canarias". Catholic-Hierarchy.org. (for Chronology of Bishops)^{self-published}
- Chow, Gabriel. "Diocese of Islas Canarias {Canary Islands} (Spain)". GCatholic.org. (for Chronology of Bishops)^{self-published}
- Cheney, David M. "Diocese of Coria-Cáceres". Catholic-Hierarchy.org. (for Chronology of Bishops) ^{[self-published]}
- Chow, Gabriel. "Diocese of Coria-Caceres (Spain)". GCatholic.org. (for Chronology of Bishops) ^{[self-published]}
- Cheney, David M. "Diocese of Jaén". Catholic-Hierarchy.org. (for Chronology of Bishops)^{self-published}
- Chow, Gabriel. "Diocese of Jaén". GCatholic.org. (for Chronology of Bishops)^{self-published}

Catholic Church titles
Preceded by Melchor Cano	Bishop of Islas Canarias; 1554–1566	Succeeded by Bartolomé Torres (bishop)
Preceded by Diego Enríquez de Almansa	Bishop of Coria; 1566–1577	Succeeded by Pedro Serrano Téllez
Preceded by Francisco Delgado López	Bishop of Jaén; 1577–1579	Succeeded by Francisco Sarmiento Mendoza
