= Peter III (bishop of Lugo) =

Galician bishop

Peter III was the Bishop of Lugo from 1113 until 1133.

Peter was a chaplain of Queen Urraca (capellanus regine) before he was raised to the see of Lugo after the resignation of his ineffective predecessor, Peter II, in 1113. According to the suggestions of the Historia compostellana, Peter III remained closely attached to the queen even after his elevation. He reorganised the chapter of the cathedral of Lugo and began construction on a new building. He was active in acquiring land for his diocese, as well as Papal privileges in 1123 and 1131.
