= Dystis =

Dystis was a city and bishopric in Roman Libya, which remains a Latin Catholic titular see.

Its modern location has been postulated in northern Tunisia or somewhere in southern modern Libya.

== History ==
Dystis was important enough in the Roman province of Libya Superior -Libya Pentapolitana; originally part of Cyrenaica (and Crete)- to become one of the suffragan sees in this province, which depend directly on the Patriarchate of Alexandria (in Egypt) without a proper Metropolitan, but faded like most bishoprics in Roman Africa.

Its only recorded Suffragan Bishops were:

- Samuel, participant in the (minor) council of Ephesus in 431
- Petrus, attending the Synod of Constantinople (458) |synod of Constantinople in 458 against simony.

== Titular see ==
In 1933 the diocese was nominally restored as Latin Titular bishopric of Dystis / Dystien(sis) (Latin adjective) / Disti (Curiate Italian).

It is vacant, having had only these incumbents, all of the fitting Episcopal (lowest) rank, with an archiepiscopal exception (pro hac vice):

- André-Joseph-Prosper Dupont, White Fathers (M. Afr.) (1941.07.08 – 1955.09.14) as last Apostolic Vicar of Bobo-Dioulasso (Burkina Faso, then Upper Volta) (1941.07.08 – 1955.09.14), next promoted first Bishop of Roman Catholic Diocese of Bobo-Dioulasso (1955.09.14 – retired 1974.12.12); died 1999
- Antonio Oña de Echave (1956.03.27 – 1961.05.24) as Auxiliary Bishop of Lugo (Spain) (1956.03.27 – 1961.05.24), next succeeded as Bishop of Lugo (1961.05.24 – retired 1979.07.25); died 1987
- Titular Archbishop Emilio de Brigard Ortiz (1961.10.26 – death 1986.03.06) as Auxiliary Bishop of Archdiocese of Bogotá (Colombia) (1944.07.29 – 1986.03.06), which he was previously as Titular Bishop of Coracesium (1944.07.29 – 1961.10.26).

== See also ==
- List of Catholic dioceses in Libya

== Sources and external links ==
- GCatholic - data for all sections

Bibliography

- Pius Bonifacius Gams, Series episcoporum Ecclesiae Catholicae, Leipzig, 1931, p. 462
- Michel Lequien, Oriens christianus in quatuor Patriarchatus digestus, Paris, 1740, Vol. II, coll. 629-630
- Raymond Janin, lemma 'Dysthis' in Dictionnaire d'Histoire et de Géographie ecclésiastiques, vol. XIV, Paris, 1960, col. 1252
