= Portrait of Rodrigo Vázquez de Arce =

1587–1597 painting by El Greco

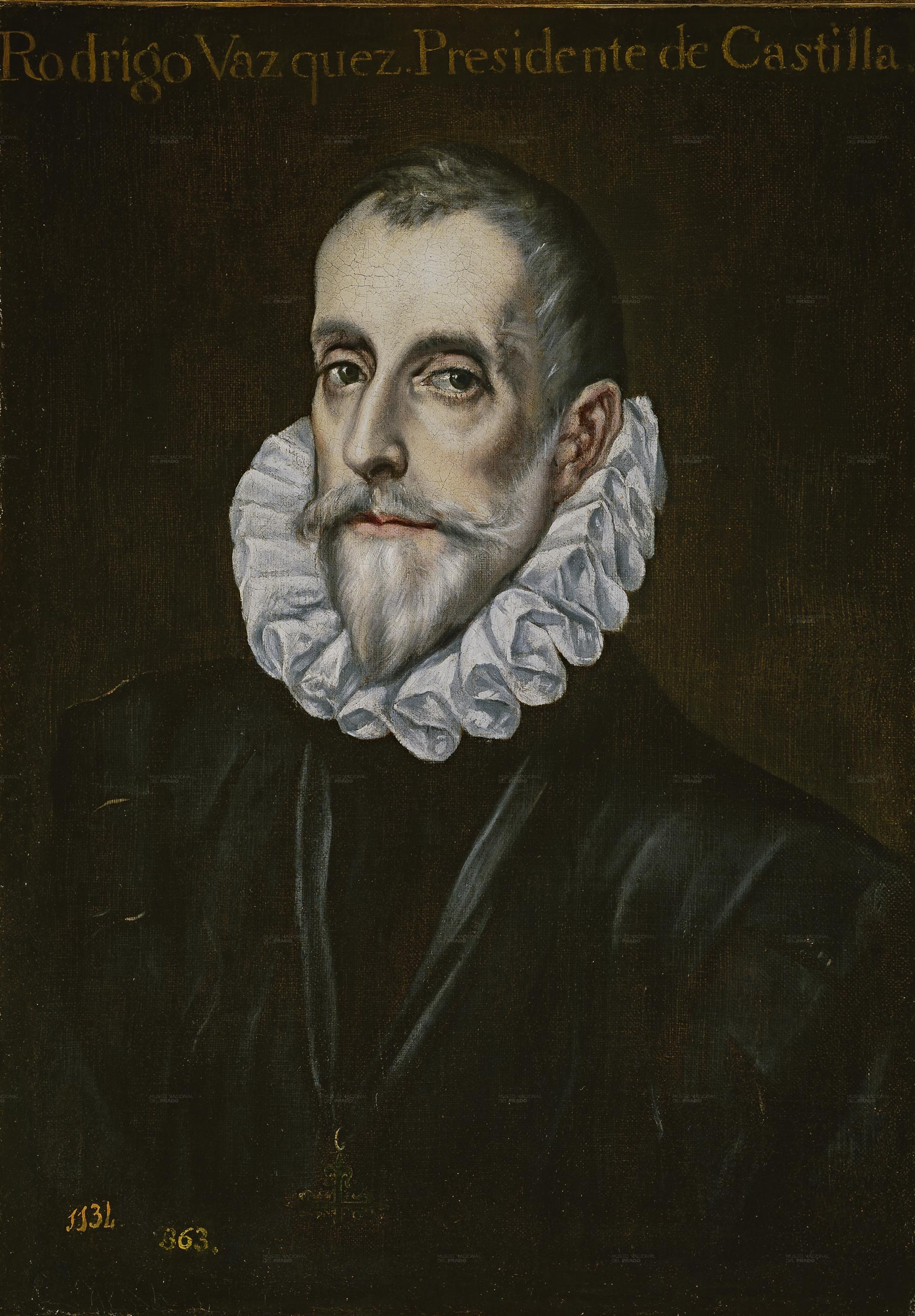
- Artist: Anonymous, after El Greco
- Medium: oil on canvas
- Dimensions: 62.5 cm × 42 cm (24.6 in × 17 in)
- Location: Museo del Prado, Madrid

Portrait of Rodrigo Vázquez de Arce is an anonymous copy of a lost 1587-1597 painting by El Greco. It is now in the Museo del Prado in Madrid. It shows Rodrigo Vázquez de Arce, president of the Council of Castille, who also features in the same artist's The Burial of Count Orgaz. Although it is different from other portraits by the artist, it still shows the strong influence of Titian and Tintoretto, who he had met in Venice.

== See also ==
- List of works by El Greco
