= La Magdalena, Jaén =

Roman Catholic church in Andalucia, Spain

Coordinates: 37.77186°N 3.79649°W

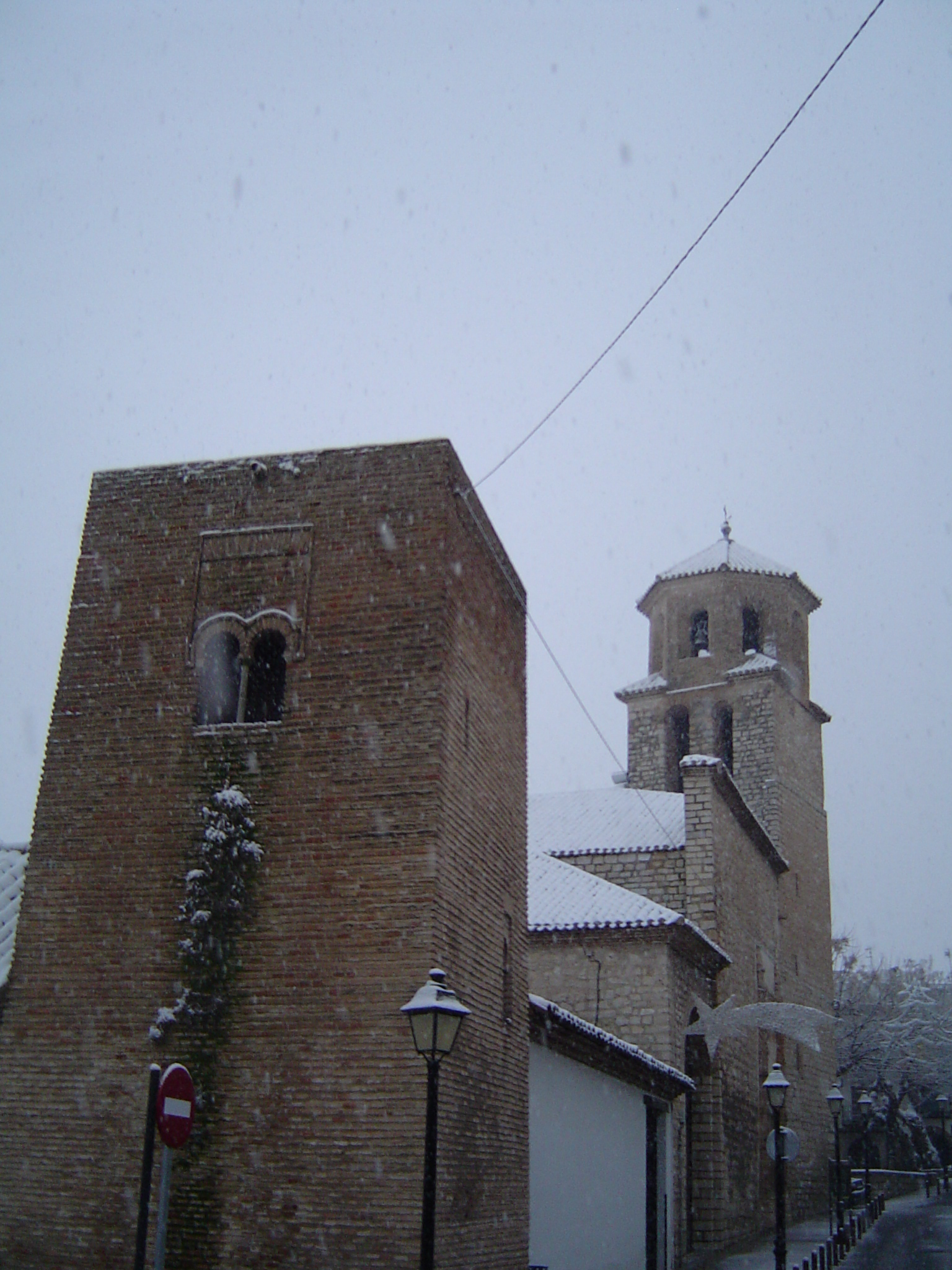
Exterior of the Church of La Magdalena in Jaén. 2009

La Magdalena is a Gothic-style, Roman Catholic church located in the city of Jaén in the province of Jaén in the autonomous community of Andalucia, Spain within the Roman Catholic Diocese of Jaén.

The church was built atop the foundations of a mosque that had been erected in 825 by Abd ar-Rahman II. The present bell-tower was the former minaret, putatively redesigned by Andrés de Vandelvira. The pool in the cloister was used by Muslim worshipers prior to entering the building. Outside in the plaza is a pool with the statue of the Lizard of Jaén (Lagarto de Jaén), depicting a legendary monster of the area.

The church a main nave and three aisles, separated by arches that are spanned by ribbed vaults. The portal has Isabelline Gothic decoration. The church includes a polychrome sculptural group depicting the Calvary attributed to Jacobo Florentino or Jerónimo Quijano; a Christ of the Mercy (1593) by Salvador de Cuéllar; and a Kneeling Magdalen (1572) by Mateo Medina. The church has a number of 17th and 18th-century canvases. The main portal doors were carved in 1555.

== See also ==
- Catholic Church in Spain

== Bibliography ==
- Berges Roldán, Luis (2007). "La iglesia de La Magdalena (Jaén). De mezquita islámica a templo cristiano". Arqueología y Territorio Medieval. 14: 69–101. doi:10.17561/aytm (inactive 1 July 2025).
