= Antonio Idiáquez Manrique =

Spanish Roman Catholic prelate

Most Reverend Antonio Idiáquez Manrique
- Bishop of Segovia
- Church: Catholic Church
- In office: 1613–1615
- Predecessor: Pedro Castro Nero
- Successor: Juan Vigil de Quiñones y Labiada
- Previous post: Bishop of Ciudad Rodrigo (1610–1613)

Orders
- Consecration: 1610 by Bernardo Sandoval Rojas

Personal details
- Born: 1579 Madrid, Spain
- Died: 17 November 1615 (age 36) Segovia, Spain

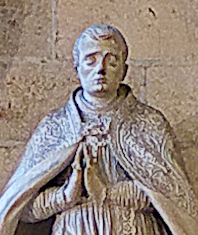
Chapel of Saint Anthony, Segovia Cathedral, tomb of Antonio Idiáquez Manrique (†1615)

Antonio Idiáquez Manrique (1579 – 17 November 1615) was a Roman Catholic prelate who served as Bishop of Segovia (1613–1615) and Bishop of Ciudad Rodrigo (1610–1613).

== Biography ==
Antonio Idiáquez Manrique was born in 1579 in Madrid, Spain. On 26 May 1610, he was appointed during the papacy of Pope Paul V as Bishop of Ciudad Rodrigo. In 1610, he was consecrated bishop by Bernardo Sandoval Rojas, Archbishop of Toledo. On 4 February 1613, he was appointed during the papacy of Pope Paul V as Bishop of Segovia. He served as Bishop of Segovia until his death on 17 November 1615.

== External links and additional sources ==
- Cheney, David M. "Diocese of Ciudad Rodrigo". Catholic-Hierarchy.org. (for Chronology of Bishops) ^{[self-published]}
- Chow, Gabriel. "Diocese of Ciudad Rodrigo". GCatholic.org. (for Chronology of Bishops) ^{[self-published]}
- Cheney, David M. "Diocese of Segovia". Catholic-Hierarchy.org. (for Chronology of Bishops) ^{[self-published]}
- Chow, Gabriel. "Diocese of Segovia (Spain)". GCatholic.org. (for Chronology of Bishops) ^{[self-published]}

Catholic Church titles
Preceded by Pedro Ponce de Léon (bishop of Zamora)	Bishop of Ciudad Rodrigo; 1610–1613	Succeeded by Jerónimo Ruiz Camargo
Preceded by Pedro Castro Nero	Bishop of Segovia; 1613–1615	Succeeded by Juan Vigil de Quiñones y Labiada
