= Juan Pardo de Tavera =

Roman Catholic cardinal, archbishop and Spanish inquisitor

His Eminence Juan Pardo de Tavera
- Cardinal Archbishop of Toledo; Primate of Spain
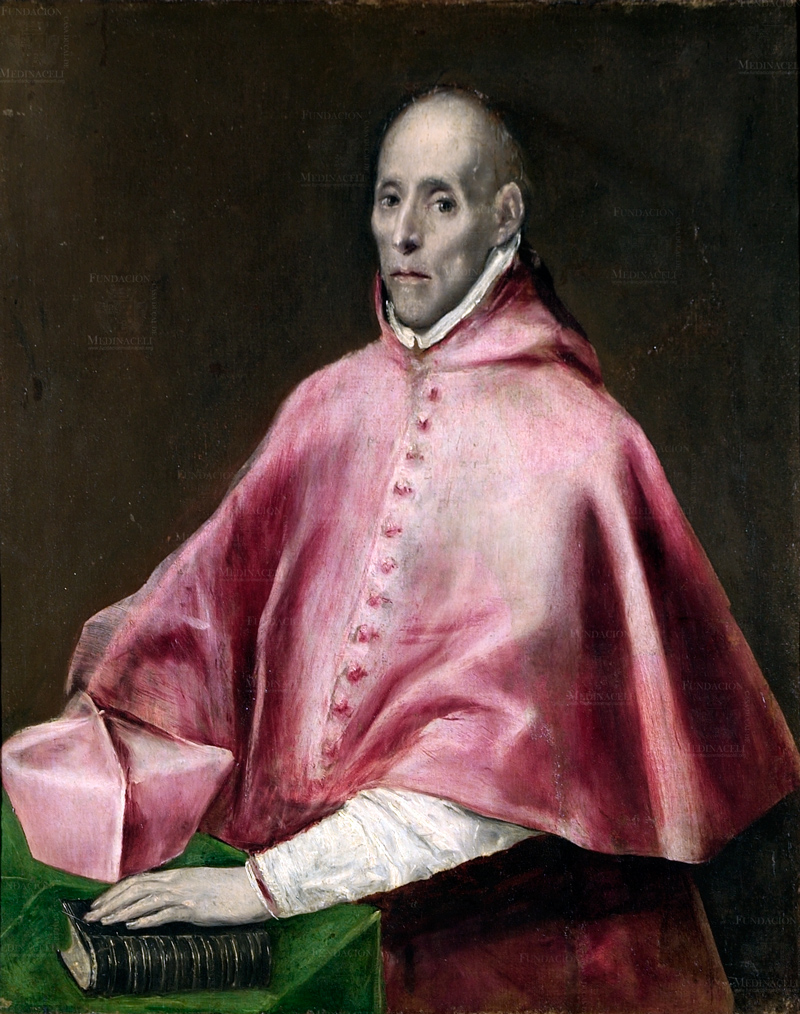
- Posthumous Portrait of Juan Pardo de Tavera by El Greco
- Archdiocese: Toledo
- Appointed: 27 Apr 1534
- Term ended: 1 August 1545
- Other post: Cardinal-priest of San Giovanni in Porta Latina
- Previous posts: Archbishop of Santiago de Compostela (1524–34); Bishop of Osma (1523–34); Bishop of Ciudad Rodrigo (1514–23)

Orders
- Created cardinal: 22 February 1531 by Pope Clement VII
- Rank: Cardinal-Priest

Personal details
- Born: 26 May 1472 Toro, Zamora, Crown of Castile
- Died: 1 August 1545 (aged 73) Valladolid, Crown of Castile

Juan Pardo de Tavera (26 May 1472 – 1 August 1545) was a Spanish Roman Catholic cardinal who was Archbishop of Toledo and Primate of Spain (1534–1545) and Grand Inquisitor of Spain (1539–1545). He had previously been Archbishop of Santiago de Compostela (1524–1534), Bishop of Osma (1523–1524), Bishop of Ciudad Rodrigo (1514–1523) and President of the Royal Council (1524-1539).

== Biography ==
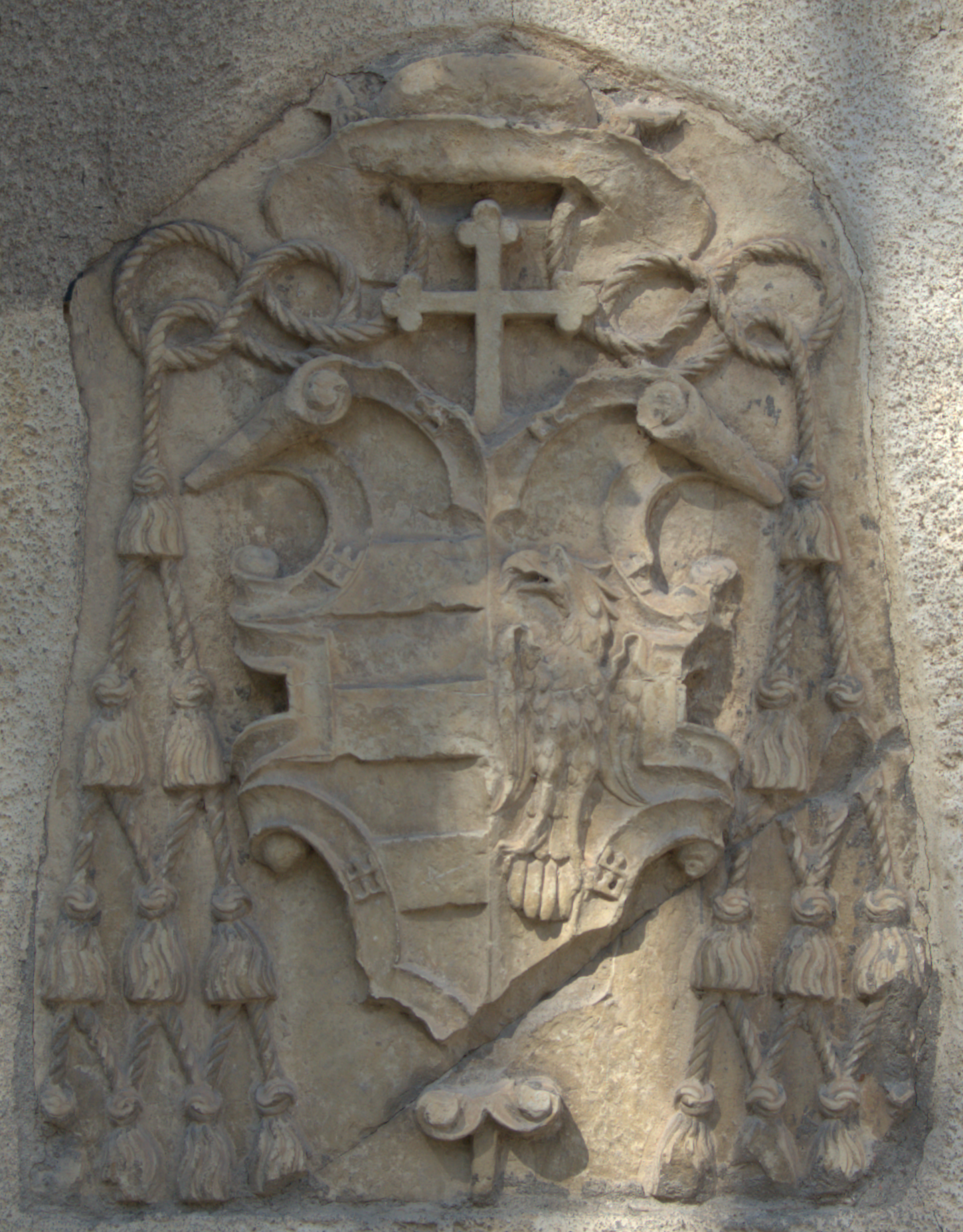
Coat of arms of archbishop.

Juan Pardo de Tavera was born in Toro, Zamora on 16 May 1472, the son of Ares Pardo and Guiomar Tavera. On his mother's side, he was the nephew of Diego Deza, who would serve as his patron and mentor. He studied at the University of Salamanca, receiving a bachelor's degree in 1500 and a Licentiate of Canon Law in 1505. He became the rector of the university in 1505.

His uncle named him a member of the cathedral chapter of Seville Cathedral in 1505. Ferdinand II of Aragon named him auditor of the Spanish Inquisition in 1506. He was elected Bishop of Ciudad Rodrigo on 14 July 1514 and consecrated as a bishop later that year. Cardinal Adrian of Utrecht appointed him as a diplomat to negotiate the marriage of Charles I of Spain to Isabella of Portugal, and of John III of Portugal with Catherine of Castile. He was translated to the see of Osma on 31 December 1523. He was promoted to Archbishop of Santiago de Compostela on 8 June 1524.

He became president of the Royal Council in 1524 and held that office for the next fifteen years. Under his rule the Royal Council was reorganized and renamed Council of Castile and the Council of the Indies was split from the Council of Castile. He presided over the Cortes Generales held in Toledo (1525), Valladolid (1527), Madrid (1528), Valladolid (1537), and Toledo (1538).

Pope Clement VII made Juan Pardo de Tavera a cardinal priest at the consistory of 22 February 1531. He subsequently received the red hat and the title of San Giovanni a Porta Latina at the consistory of 27 April 1531.

He was transferred to the see of Toledo on 27 April 1534, thus becoming Primate of Spain.

Following the death of Isabella of Portugal on 1 May 1539, Charles V appointed Juan Pardo de Tavera regent of Castile in his absence, a post he would hold until 1541. At the same time, he was appointed Grand Inquisitor of Spain on 10 June 1539 and he began his duties as Grand Inquisitor on 7 December 1539.

He died in Valladolid on 1 August 1545. He was buried in the Hospital de San Juan Bautista de Toledo, in a marble tomb designed by Alonso Berruguete.
While Bishop, he was the principal consecrator of Esteban Almeida, Bishop of Astorga (1540); Durante Duranti, Bishop of Alghero (1540); Antoine Perrenot de Granvella, Bishop of Arras (1542); St. Tomás Garcia Martinez (de Villanueva), Archbishop of Valencia in Spain (1544); and Juan Bernal Díaz de Luco, Bishop of Calahorra y La Calzada (1545).

Catholic Church titles
Preceded by Francisco Ruiz (bishop)	Bishop of Ciudad Rodrigo; 1514–1523	Succeeded by Pedro Portocarrero (archbishop)
Preceded by Alfonso Enríquez	Bishop of Osma; 1523–1524	Succeeded by García de Loaysa y Mendoza
Preceded by Alonso III Fonseca	Archbishop of Santiago de Compostela; 1524–1534	Succeeded by Pedro Gómez Sarmiento de Villandrando
Preceded by Gabriel de Gramont	Cardinal-Priest of San Giovanni a Porta Latina; 1531–1545	Succeeded by Jean Suau
Preceded by Alonso III Fonseca	Archbishop of Toledo; 1534–1545	Succeeded by Juan Martínez Silíceo
Preceded by Alonso Manrique de Lara	Grand Inquisitor of Spain; 1539–1545	Succeeded by García de Loaysa
Preceded by Antonio de Rojas Manrique	President of the Royal Council; 1524–1539	Succeeded by Fernando de Valdés y Salas
