= Johan Martins =

Galician clergyman

Johan Martins was a medieval Galician clergyman.

Catholic Church titles
Preceded by Fernan Arias	Bishop of Lugo; 1277–1281	Succeeded by Alonso Eans
