= José Higinio Gómez González =

Spanish Roman Catholic bishop

José Higinio Gómez González OFM
- Bishop of Lugo
- Native name: Xosé Hixinio Gómez González
- Church: Catholic Church
- Diocese: Diocese of Lugo
- In office: 23 April 1980 – 30 November 2007
- Predecessor: Antonio Oña de Echave
- Successor: Afonso Carrasco Rouco

Orders
- Ordination: 24 June 1956
- Consecration: 28 June 1980 by Luigi Dadaglio

Personal details
- Born: 3 April 1932 Lalín, Galicia, Spanish Republic
- Died: 8 January 2008 (aged 75)

José Higinio Gómez González (3 April 1932 − 8 January 2008) was a Spanish Roman Catholic bishop.

Ordained to the priesthood in 1956, Gómez González was named bishop of Roman Catholic Diocese of Lugo, Spain in 1980 and retired in 2007.
