= Diocese of Dragonara =

The Roman Catholic Diocese of Dragonara (Latin: Dioecesis Dragonariensis) was a Roman Catholic diocese located in the town of Torremaggiore in the province of Foggia in the Apulia region of southeast Italy. It was established as a diocese ca. 1030. On 21 February 1580, the diocese was suppressed, and its territory and Catholic population were assigned to the Diocese of San Severo.

In 1968 the title of Bishop of Dragonara, though not the diocese itself, was revived as a titular See.

== History ==
The fortress of Draconaria (Dragonara), like Troia, Montecorvino, Civitate, Lesina, and Castel Fiorentino in the Capitanata area, was most likely erected by the catapan (Byzantine governor) Basilio Boioannes, not long after his victory over the Apulians in 1018.

A bishopric was established in Draconaria by c. 1030. Bishop Almeradus issued a document in favor of the monastery of S. Jacobus et S. Maria of Tremiti in February 1045, which he states was the 16th year of his episcopate.

On 12 July 1053, Pope Leo IX issued the bull "Cum Summae Apostolicae", in which he confirmed the privileges and possessions of the Church of Benevento for Archbishop Voldaricus. The list of properties did not include Draconara. In a bull, "Cum Summae Apostolicae", on 24 January 1058, Pope Stephen IX confirmed for Archbishop Vodalricus of Benevento the privileges and properties granted to the Church of Benevento by Pope Leo IX. These included some which had not appeared in the bull of Leo IX, including Draconara. Draconaria, it appears, became a suffragan bishopric of the archdiocese of Benevento between 1053 and 1058, probably on the latter date.

There was still a bishop of Dragonara in 1571, but he was noticed to be absent from the provincial council of Benevento in April 1571.

The new diocese of San Severo was established by Pope Gregory XIII on 9 March 1580, through the suppression of the diocese of Civitas. Its first bishop was appointed on 18 February 1581. In 1686, Cardinal Orsini addressed his first pastoral letter as Archbishop of Benevento addresses himself to the "Civitatem, et Draconariam unitas". In 1680, and again in 1693, the bishop of San Severo signed himself, "Ego Carolus Felix de Matta, episcopus Sancti Severi, Civitatensis et Dragoniensis."

== Bishops ==
=== to 1400 ===
- Almeradus (c.1030 – after 1045)
- Leo (attested 1061)
- Campo (attested 1071, 1075, 1077)
- Leo (attested 1082)

...

- Johannes (attested 1095)
- Berardus (attested 1100)

...

- Robertus (attested 1137)
- Campus (attested 1143)

...

- Rogerius (attested 1163)

...

- Nicolo (attested 1179)
- Giovanni (ca. 1192, attested 1196)

...

- [unnamed] (1218)

...

- Giovanni (attested in 1236)

...

- Benedictus (attested in 1283)
- R[--] (attested in 1298)
- Benedictus
- Pietro (attested in 1318)
- Simone (attested in 1335)
- Pietro (1343-)
- Marinus (8 May 1345- )
- Bernardo
- Walterus de Copello, O.P. (9 January 1349- )
- Joannes (attested in 1350 in Avignon)
- Marchisano da Bologna (14 June 1364 – 1366)
- Gerardus de Montefusculo, O.Min. (8 November 1367- )
- Giovanni Pietro de Piperno (21 June 1372 - )
- Bartholomeus Petri, O.Min. (attested 1382) Roman Obedience
- Jacobus (attested 1392)
- Francesco Bardi (28 January 1399- )

=== since 1400 ===
Sede vacante (1438–1449)
Nicolaus Tartagli, O.Cist. (1 Aug 1438 - ? ) in commendam

- Bartolommeo Tesseri (1449–1452)
- Benedetto, O.S.A. (23 Jul 1451 Appointed - 1482 Died)

Sede vacante (1482–1519)

- Jacobus Brunus de Severo (20 May 1519 Appointed - 1551 Died)
- Alfonso de Valdecabras (21 Aug 1551 Appointed - 1554 Resigned)
- Luis Suárez (1 Oct 1554 Appointed - )

== See also ==
- Catholic Church in Italy

== Books ==
- Cappelletti, Giuseppe (1864). Le chiese d'Italia: dalla loro origine sino ai nostri giorni (in Italian). Vol. Tomo decimonono (19). Venice: G. Antonelli. pp. 337–340.
- Eubel, Conradus, ed. (1913). Hierarchia catholica, Tomus 1 (second ed.). Münster: Libreria Regensbergiana. (in Latin)
- Eubel, Conradus, ed. (1914). Hierarchia catholica, Tomus 2 (second ed.). Münster: Libreria Regensbergiana.
- Eubel, Conradus; Gulik, Guilelmus (1923). Hierarchia catholica, Tomus 3 (second ed.). Münster: Libreria Regensbergiana.
- Gams, Pius Bonifatius (1873). Series episcoporum Ecclesiae catholicae: quotquot innotuerunt a beato Petro apostolo (in Latin). Ratisbon: Typis et Sumptibus Georgii Josephi Manz.
- Gauchat, Patritius (Patrice) (1935). Hierarchia catholica IV (1592-1667). Münster: Libraria Regensbergiana.
- Kehr, Paulus Fridolin (1962). Italia pontificia. Regesta pontificum Romanorum. Vol. IX: Samnia – Apulia – Lucania. Berlin: Weidmann. (in Latin). p. 152-153.
- Rossi, Camillo (1826). Synodus Severopolitana a Joanne Camillo Rossi episcopo an. 1823 celebrata. Napoli: ex Paciano Typographio, 1826. List of Bishops of Dragonara: pp. 79–94.
