= Juan Ruiz de Villarán =

Spanish Roman Catholic prelate

Most Reverend Juan Ruiz de Villarán
- Bishop of Lugo
- Church: Catholic Church
- Diocese: Diocese of Lugo
- In office: 1587–1591
- Predecessor: Fernando Vellosillo Barrio
- Successor: Lorenzo Asensio Otaduy Avendaño

Personal details
- Died: 18 March 1591 Lugo, Spain

Juan Ruiz de Villarán (died 18 March 1591) was a Roman Catholic prelate who served as Bishop of Lugo (1587–1591).

== Biography ==
On 22 June 1587, Juan Ruiz de Villarán was appointed during the papacy of Pope Sixtus V as Bishop of Lugo. He served as Bishop of Lugo until his death on 18 March 1591.

== External links and additional sources ==
- Cheney, David M. "Diocese of Lugo". Catholic-Hierarchy.org. (for Chronology of Bishops) ^{[self-published]}
- Chow, Gabriel. "Diocese of Lugo (Spain)". GCatholic.org. (for Chronology of Bishops) ^{[self-published]}

Catholic Church titles
Preceded by Fernando Vellosillo Barrio	Bishop of Lugo; 1587–1591	Succeeded by Lorenzo Asensio Otaduy Avendaño
