= Lugo Cathedral =

Cultural property in Lugo, Spain

Saint Mary's Cathedral
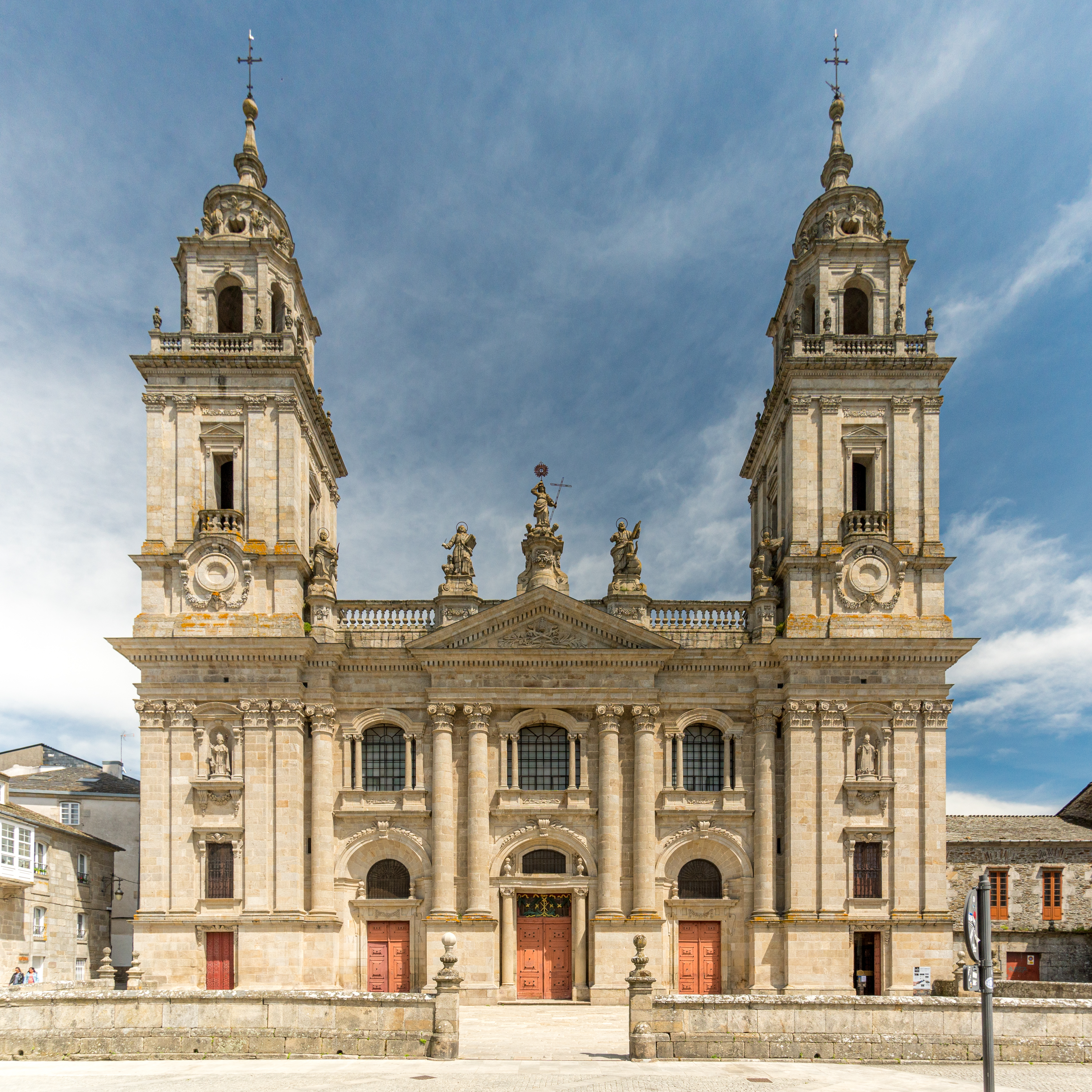
- West façade.

- Location within Spain

Religion
- Affiliation: Roman Catholic Church

Location
- Location: Lugo, Galicia, Spain
- Coordinates: 43.0092°N 7.5583°W

Architecture
- Architect: Raimundo
- Type: Church
- Style: Romanesque (Gothic, Baroque, Neoclassical)
- Groundbreaking: 1129
- Completed: 1273
- Spire: 2
- UNESCO World Heritage Site
- Type: Cultural
- Criteria: ii, iv, vi
- Designated: 1993 (17th session)
- Parent listing: Routes of Santiago de Compostela: Camino Francés and Routes of Northern Spain
- Reference no.: 669bis-007
- Region: Europe and North America
- Spanish Cultural Heritage
- Official name: Catedral de Santa María
- Type: Real property
- Criteria: Monument
- Designated: 3 June 1931
- Reference no.: RI-51-0000708

Saint Mary's Cathedral (Galician: Catedral de Santa María), better known as Lugo Cathedral, is a Roman Catholic church and basilica in Lugo, Galicia, north-western Spain. The cathedral was erected in the early 12th century in a Romanesque style, with Gothic, Baroque and Neoclassical elements.

== History ==
Before the construction of the current cathedral, a pre-Romanesque church stood on the site, commissioned by Bishop Odoarius in 755. The poor condition of the structure, already in the 11th century, led Bishop Peter III to commission a new Romanesque-style edifice from Raimundo de Monforte, a local architect and builder, in 1129. The building was completed in 1273.

In the 14th century, the apse was demolished and replaced by a larger one in the Gothic style, with chapels added to it.

Later renovations and restorations added elements in other styles, such as the Renaissance retablo at the high altar. It was destroyed in the 1755 Lisbon earthquake and fragments of it are housed in the church.

The cathedral received from the Pope the privilege to permanently expose the Holy Sacrament.

== Structure ==
The cathedral has a Latin Cross structure, with a length of 85 m. It has a nave, covered by a barrel vault, and two aisles, with an ambulatory and five apse chapels. The triforium features triple ogival mullioned windows. The apse houses a calvary sculpture from an unknown date.

The façade is a Neoclassical design by Julián Sánchez Bort inspired by a plan proposed by Ventura Rodríguez for the Pamplona Cathedral. Its construction was finished in the late 19th century, with the completion of the two side towers.

The northern entrance's narthex is in Gothic style, dating to 1510-1530. Internally showing a starred vault, it is formed by three archivolts with a lintel showing Christ Pantocrator and with a pinjante (glove-shaped decorative pendant) that features a depiction of the Last Supper.

To the right of the entrance is the Gothic Torre Vella (bell tower), surmounted by a Renaissance top floor finished by Gaspar de Arce in 1580. The sacristy (1678) and the cloister (1714) are in the Baroque style, as is the central chapel of the triforium (1726). The chapel of St. Froilán is in Renaissance style, dating to the 17th century. Notable is the choir, built by Francisco de Moure (early 17th century).

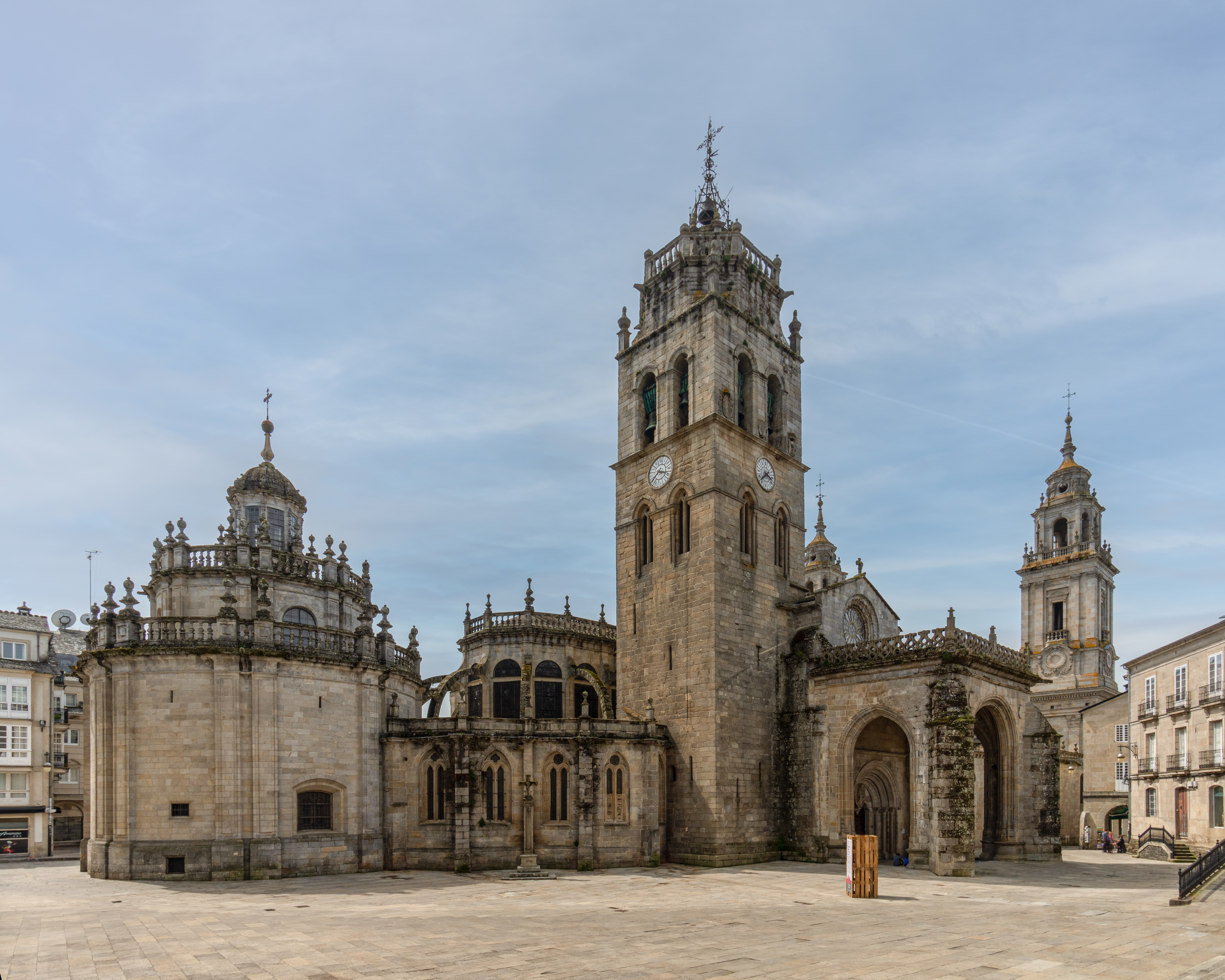
View with the bell tower and the Gothic-style rear, featuring buttresses.

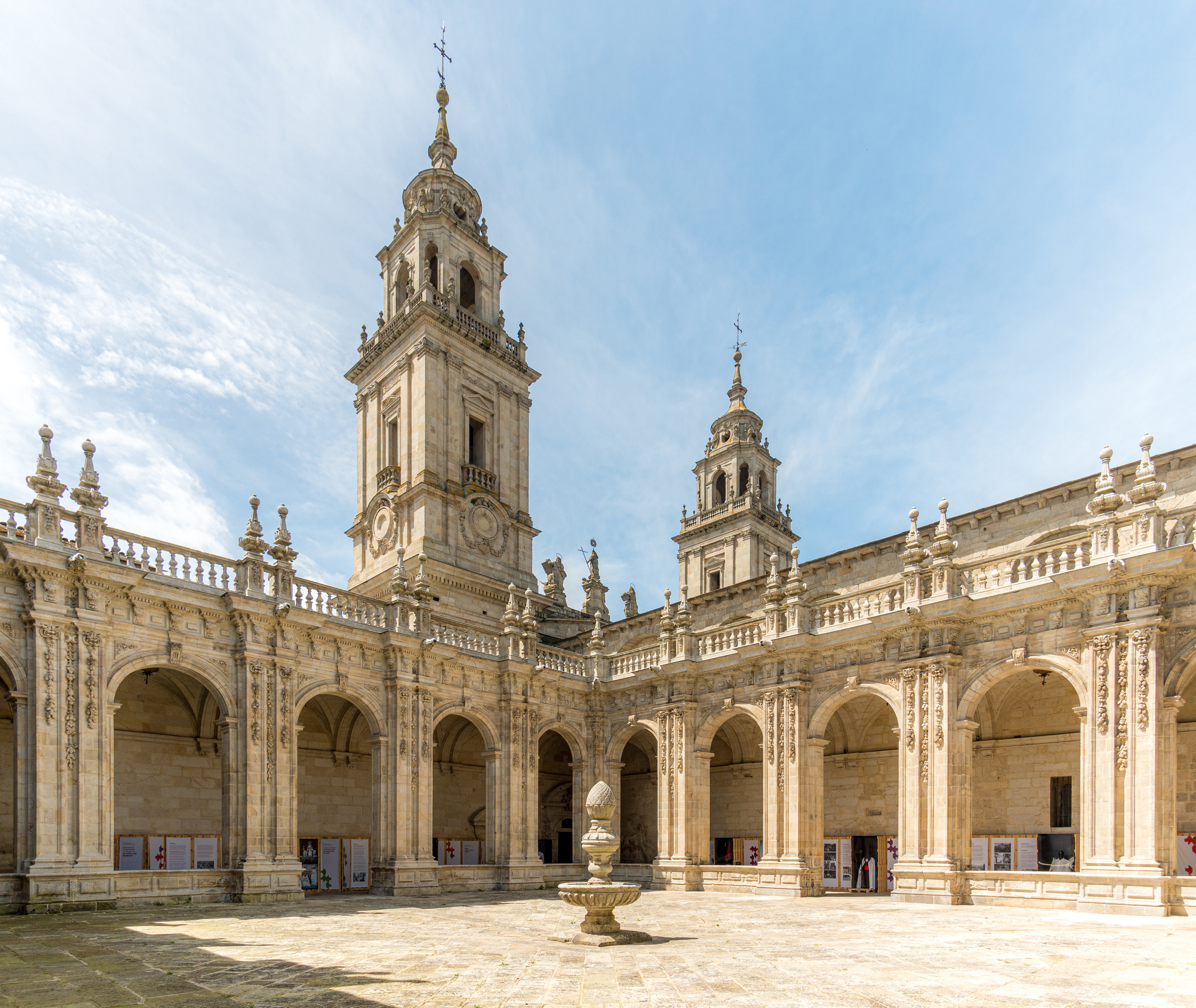
Cloister

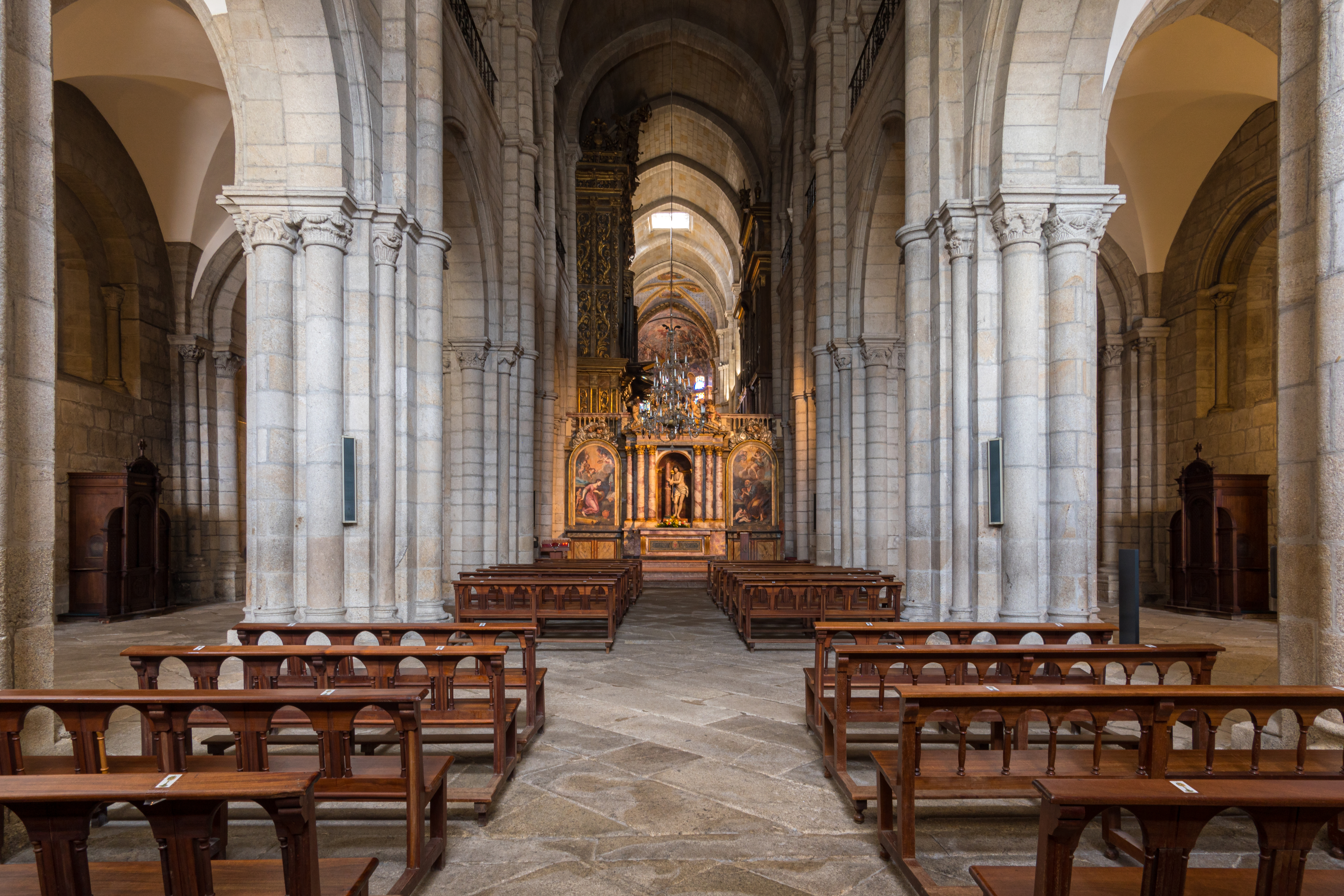
Main Nave

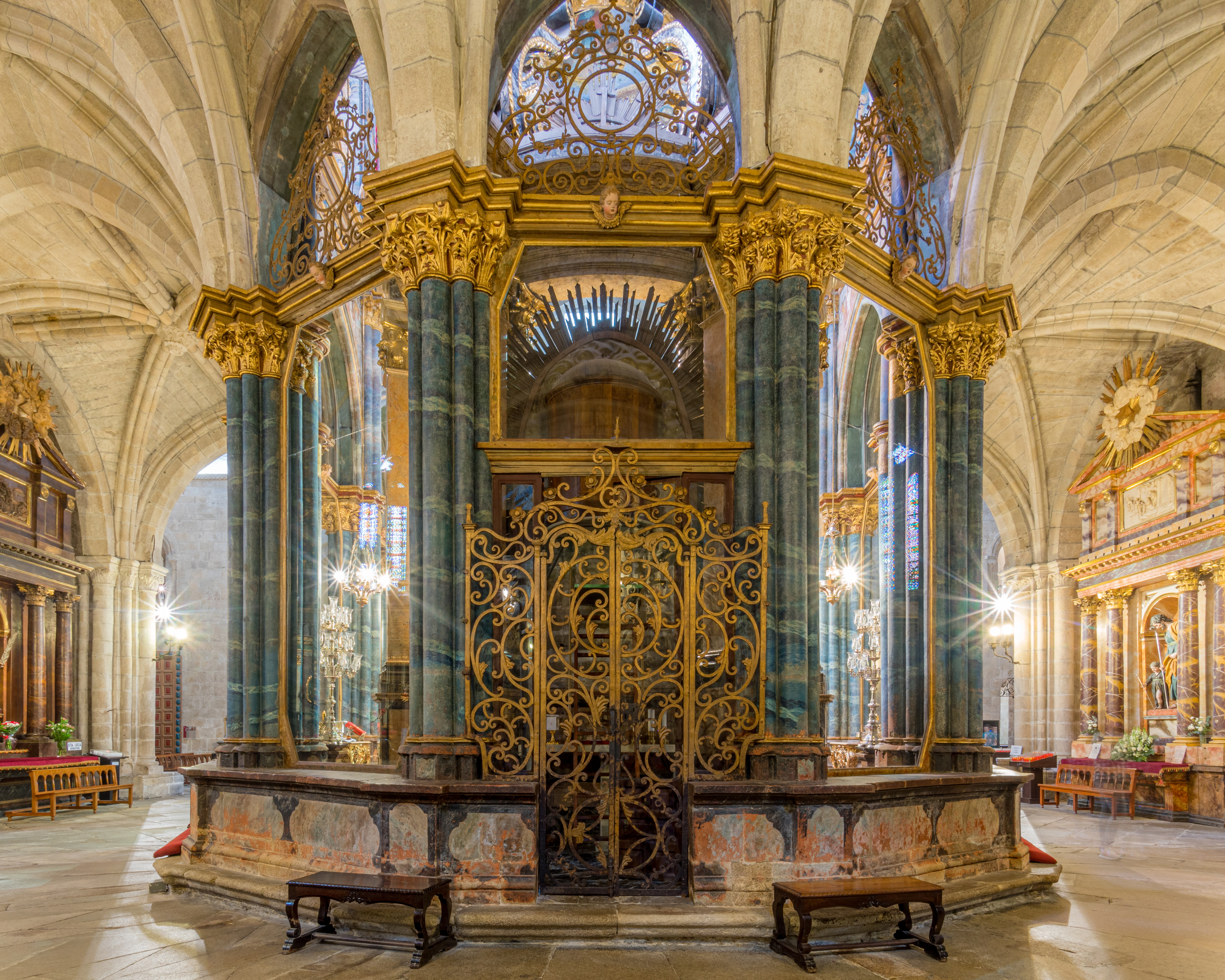
Ambulatory

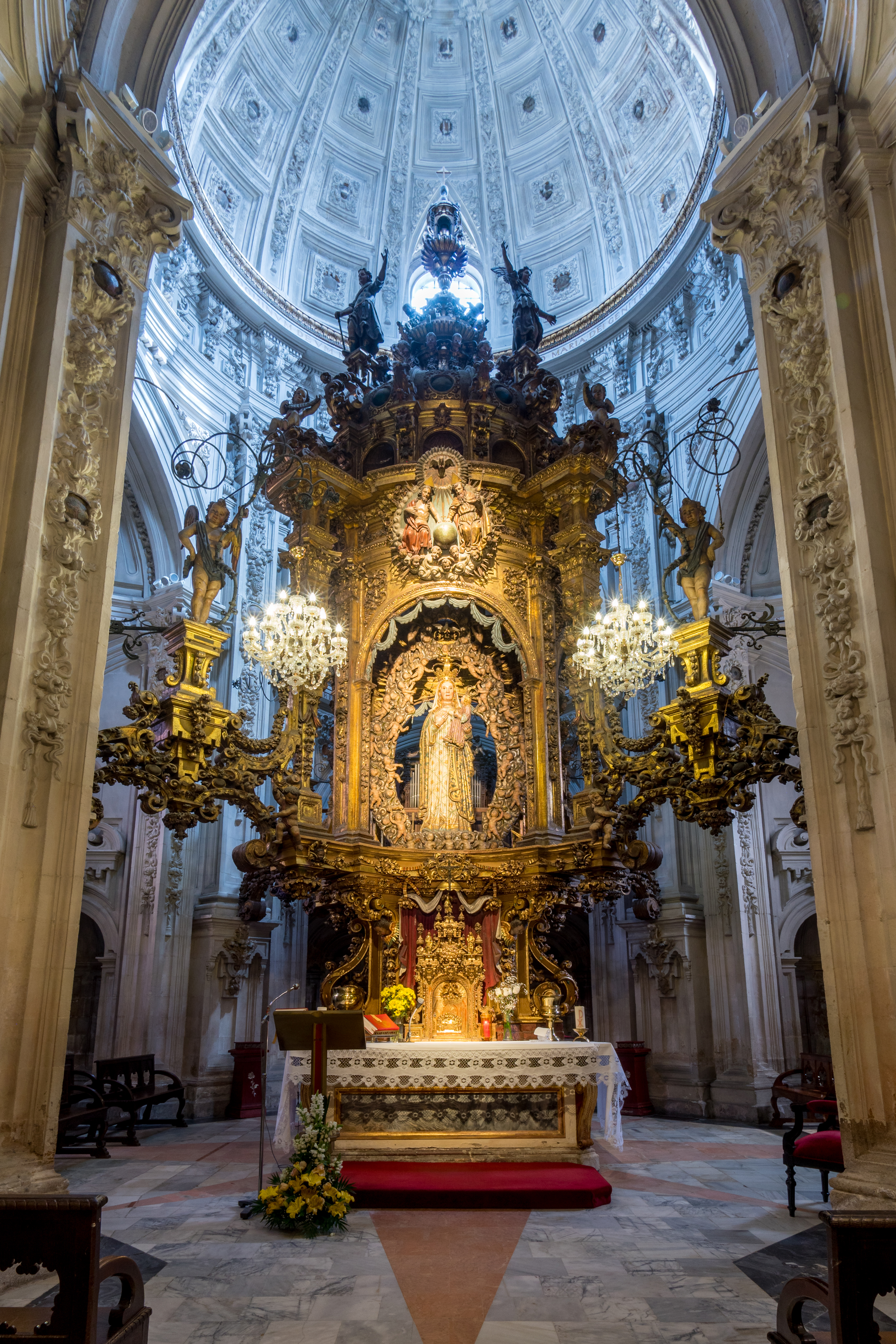
Chapel of the Virgin of the Big Eyes
