= Alonso Manrique de Lara =

Catholic cardinal and Spanish inquisitor

Alfonso or Alonso Manrique de Lara y Solís (Segura de León, Badajoz, 1476 – Seville, 28 September 1538) was a Spanish churchman.

== Biography ==
Manrique was born in Segura de León in Badajoz, apparently a son from the third marriage of the famous Rodrigo Manrique de Lara with a Solís-Castañeda woman (1404 – Ocaña, 1476), being therefore a very young stepbrother of the poet Jorge Manrique de Lara (circa 1440 – 1479, died besieging the castle of Garcimuñoz). Jerónimo Manrique de Lara was his son.

He was Bishop of Badajoz (September 1499 until before 1516), Bishop of Córdoba (August 1516 – 1523) and Archbishop of Seville (from August 1523). He was Inquisitor General (September 1523 onwards) as a successor of Adrian of Utrecht (later Pope Adrian VI), and appointed around February – April 1531 as cardinal-priest of the Santi Apostoli, Rome. After he was given the title of cardinal-priest of San Callisto, from 17 April 1531 till 12 July 1532.

He died on 28 September 1538 in Seville after falling from a horse.

== External links and additional sources ==
- Cheney, David M. "Diocese of Córdoba". Catholic-Hierarchy.org. (for Chronology of Bishops) ^{[self-published]}
- Chow, Gabriel. "Diocese of Córdoba". GCatholic.org. (for Chronology of Bishops) ^{[self-published]}

Catholic Church titles
| Preceded by Adrian of Utrecht | Grand Inquisitor of Spain; 1523–1538 | Succeeded by Juan Pardo de Tavera |
