= Francisco Mendoza (bishop of Jaén) =

Most Reverend Francisco Mendoza
- Bishop of Jaén
- Church: Catholic Church
- Diocese: Diocese of Jaén
- In office: 1538–1543
- Predecessor: Alessandro Farnese (cardinal)
- Successor: Pedro Pacheco de Villena

Personal details
- Born: Granada, Spain
- Died: 1543 Speyer, Germany

Francisco Mendoza (died 1543) was a Roman Catholic prelate who served as Bishop of Jaén (1538–1543).

== Biography ==
Francisco Mendoza was born in Granada, Spain. On 14 Jun 1538, he was appointed during the papacy of Pope Paul III as Bishop of Jaén. He served as Bishop of Jaén until his death in 1543 in Speyer, Germany.

== External links and additional sources ==
- Cheney, David M. "Diocese of Jaén". Catholic-Hierarchy.org. (for Chronology of Bishops) ^{[self-published]}
- Chow, Gabriel. "Diocese of Jaén (Spain)". GCatholic.org. (for Chronology of Bishops) ^{[self-published]}

Catholic Church titles
Preceded by Alessandro Farnese (cardinal)	Bishop of Jaén; 1538–1543	Succeeded by Pedro Pacheco de Villena
