= Rodrigo Vázquez de Arce =

Spanish statesman and jurist

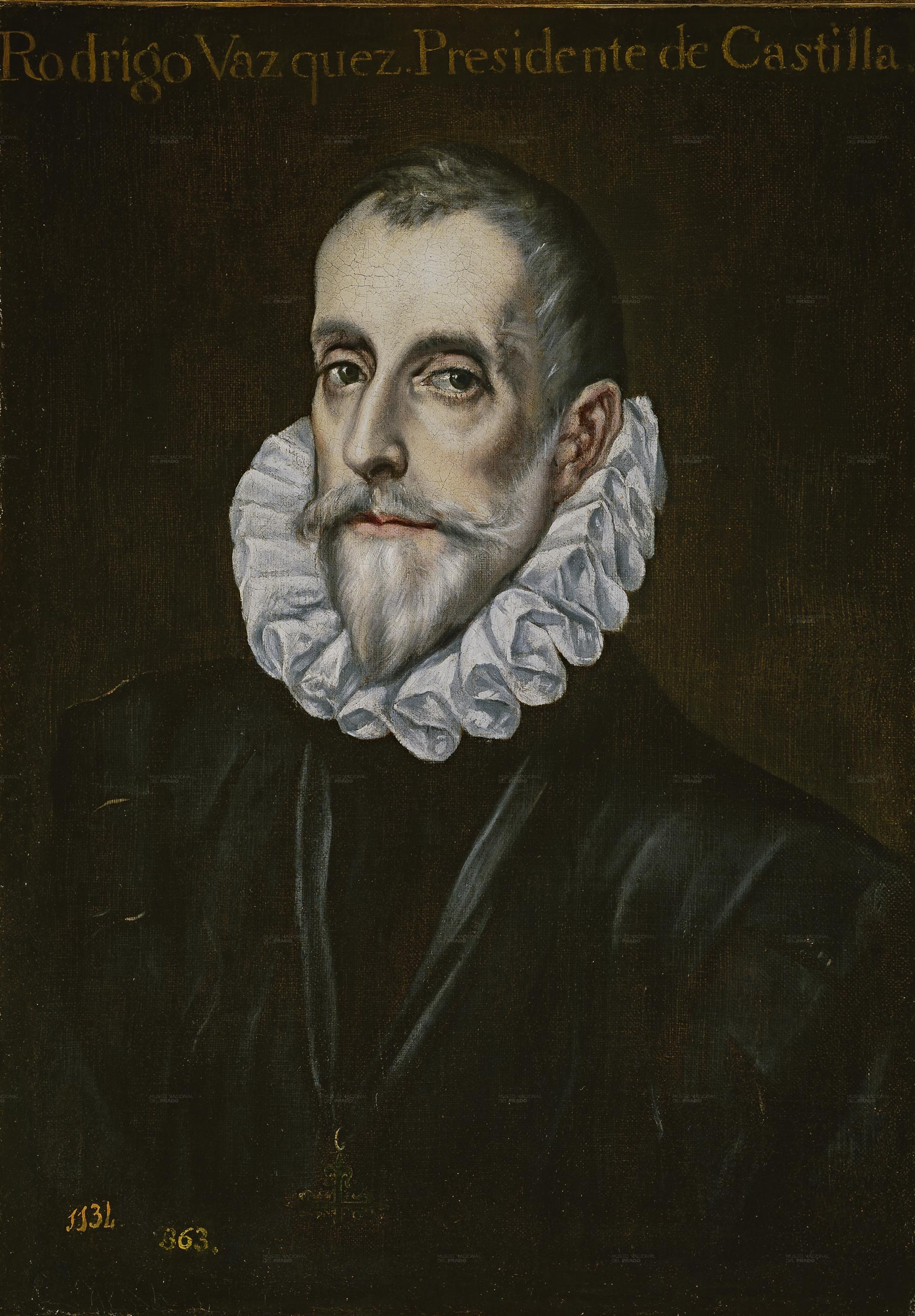
Portrait of Rodrigo Vázquez de Arce. Anonymous copy of a work by El Greco. Ca. 1590. (Museo del Prado, Madrid).

Rodrigo Vázquez de Arce (1529 - 1599) was a Spanish statesman and jurist.

== Life ==
Born in Ávila, he was the son of a law professor and advisor to Charles I of Spain. He studied in the Colegio Mayor Santa Cruz of the University of Valladolid and became a judge in the Royal Chancellery of Granada, a member of the Council of Castile and a member of the Council of the Inquisition. In 1579 Philip II of Spain sent him to Portugal during the Portuguese succession crisis of 1580 after Sebastian I of Portugal's death, in order to claim Philip's rights to the throne of Portugal.

On his return to Spain he became a councillor of the Chamber of Castile and was made a knight of the Order of Alcántara, within which he was given the key and commandery of La Magdalena. In 1584 he became president of the Council of Hacienda and in 1592 president of the Council of Castile. He was a judge in the trial of the king's secretary Antonio Pérez and was made a member of the Council of State by Philip III.

However, he fell from grace because of intriguing by the conde de Miranda Juan de Zúñiga Avellaneda y Bazán, who convinced the King to dismiss Vázquez as president of the Council of Castile and replace him with himself. He was expelled from Court and retired to El Carpio, where he died a few months after his dismissal, from complications arising from hemorrhoids. He was buried there in the family vault in the parish church of Santiago Apóstol.
