= Diocese of Jaén =

Roman Catholic diocese in Spain

Coordinates: 37.7667°N 3.7831°W

Diocese of Jaén Dioecesis Giennensis Diócesis de Jaén

Catholic
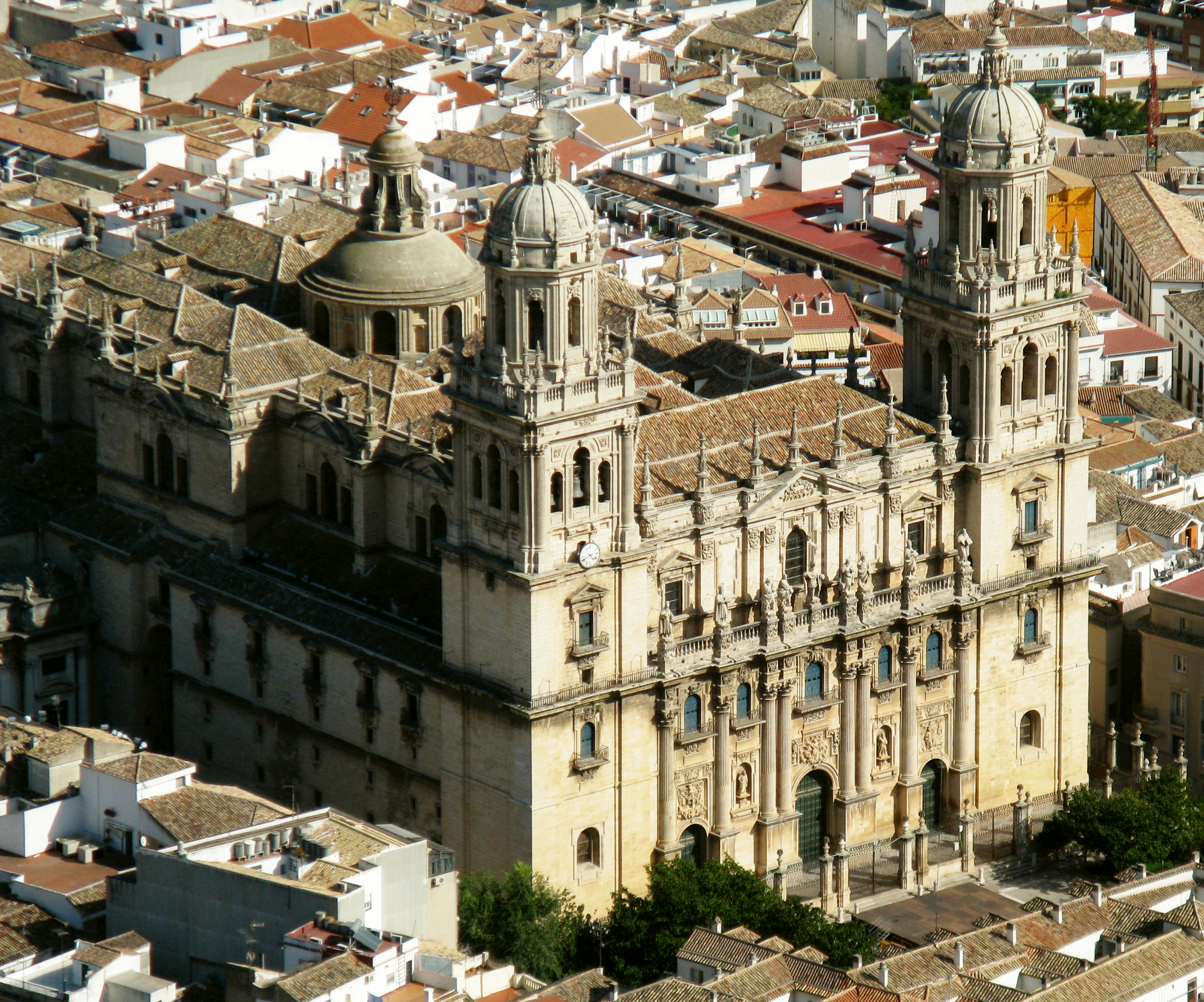

Location
- Country: Spain
- Ecclesiastical province: Granada
- Metropolitan: Granada

Statistics
- Area: 13,497 km^{2} (5,211 sq mi)
- Population: Total; Catholics: (as of 2006); 660,284; 655,000 (99.2%)

Information
- Rite: Latin Rite
- Established: 7th Century
- Cathedral: Cathedral of the Assumption of Our Lady in Jaén
- Patron saint: Our Lady of Cabeza

Current leadership
- Pope: Leo XIV
- Bishop: Sebastián Chico Martínez
- Metropolitan Archbishop: Francisco Javier Martínez Fernández
- Bishops emeritus: Ramón del Hoyo López

Website
- Website of the Diocese

The Diocese of Jaén (Latin: Dioecesis Giennensis) is a Latin Church diocese of the Catholic Church in the city of Jaén in the ecclesiastical province of Granada in Spain.

== History ==
- 7th century: Established as Diocese of Jaén

== Leadership ==
Bishops of Jaén (Roman rite)

- Domingo, O.P. (1236–1248 Died)

. . .

- Pedro Pascual, O. de M. (27 Feb 1296 – 6 Dec 1300 Died)

. . .

- Alfonso Vázquez de Acuña (1457–1474 Died)
- Iñigo Manrique de Lara (archbishop) (1475 – 15 Jan 1483 Appointed Archbishop of Sevilla)
- Luis Osorio (1483–1496 Died)
- Diego de Deza, O.P. (14 Feb 1498 – 7 Feb 1500 Appointed Bishop of Palencia)
- Alonso Suárez de la Fuente del Sauce (1500–1520 Died)
- Esteban Gabriel Merino (12 Jun 1523 – 28 Jul 1535 Died)
- Alessandro Farnese (cardinal) (30 Jul 1535 – 6 Jul 1537 Resigned)
- Francisco Mendoza (bishop of Jaén) (14 Jun 1538 – 1543 Died)
- Pedro Pacheco de Villena (Ladrón de Guevara) (9 Jan 1545 – 30 Apr 1554 Appointed Bishop of Sigüenza)
- Diego Tavera Ponce de Léon (17 Jul 1555 – 28 Apr 1560 Died)
- Diego de los Cobos Molina (4 Sep 1560 – 8 Sep 1565 Died)
- Francisco Delgado López (bishop) (26 Apr 1566 – 2 Oct 1576 Died)
- Diego Deza Tello (11 Sep 1577 – 13 Sep 1579 Died)
- Francisco Sarmiento Mendoza (27 May 1580 – 9 Jun 1595 Died)
- Bernardo de Sandoval y Rojas (29 Apr 1596 – 19 Apr 1599 Appointed Archbishop of Toledo)
- Sancho Dávila Toledo (10 Jan 1600 – 20 Jul 1615 Appointed Bishop of Sigüenza)
- Francisco Martínez de Cenicero (3 Aug 1615 – 28 Nov 1617 Died)
- Baltasar Moscoso y Sandoval (29 Apr 1619 – 28 May 1646 Appointed Archbishop of Toledo)
- Juan Queipo de Llano Flores (18 Feb 1647 – 1 Nov 1647 Died)
- Fernando Andrade Castro (6 Jul 1648 – 21 Feb 1664 Died)
- Antonio Peña Hermosa (11 Aug 1664 – 19 Jul 1667 Died)
- Jerónimo Rodríguez de Valderas, O. de M. (9 Apr 1668 – 7 Mar 1671 Died)
- Antonio Fernández del Campo Angulo y Velasco (1 Jul 1671 – 23 Dec 1681 Died)
- Juan Asensio Barrios, O. de M. (20 Apr 1682 – 22 Apr 1692 Died)
- Antonio de Brizuela y Salamanca (13 Apr 1693 – 10 Jan 1708 Died)
- Benito Omañana (24 Sep 1708 – 19 Mar 1712 Died)
- Rodrigo Marín y Rubio (28 May 1714 – 10 Feb 1732 Died)
- Manuel Isidro Orozco Manrique de Lara (21 Jul 1732 – 5 May 1738 Appointed Archbishop of Santiago de Compostela)
- Andrés Cabrejas Molina (5 May 1738 – 4 Sep 1746 Died)
- Francisco Castillo Vintimilla (31 Jul 1747 – 15 Nov 1749 Died)
- Benito Marín, O.S.B. (27 Apr 1750 – 10 Aug 1769 Died)
- Antonio Gómez de la Torre y Jaraveitia (28 May 1770 – 23 Mar 1779 Died)
- Agustín Rubín Cevallos (18 Sep 1780 – 8 Feb 1793 Died)
- Pedro Rubio-Benedicto Herrero (21 Feb 1794 – 27 May 1795 Died)
- Diego Melo Portugal, O.S.A. (18 Dec 1795 – 22 Jan 1816 Died)
- Andrés Esteban y Gómez (22 Jul 1816 – 17 Jun 1831 Died)
- Diego Martínez Carlón y Teruel (24 Feb 1832 – 28 Aug 1836 Died)
- José Escolano y Fenoi (17 Dec 1847 – 21 Jul 1854 Died)
- Tomás Roda y Rodríguez (25 Sep 1857 – 11 Mar 1858 Died)
- Andrés Rosales y Muñoz (25 Jun 1858 – 22 Sep 1864 Confirmed Bishop of Almería)
- Antolín Monescillo y Viso (27 Mar 1865 – 22 Jun 1877 Confirmed Archbishop of Valencia)
- Manuel María León González y Sánchez (22 Jun 1877 – 20 Oct 1896 Died)
- Victoriano Guisasola y Menéndez (19 Apr 1897 – 16 Dec 1901 Appointed Bishop of Madrid)
- Salvador Castellote y Pinazo (16 Dec 1901 – 6 Dec 1906 Appointed Archbishop of Sevilla)
- Juan José Laguarda y Fenollera (6 Dec 1906 – 29 Apr 1909 Confirmed Bishop of Barcelona)
- Juan Manuel Sanz y Saravia (29 Apr 1909 – 19 Jun 1919 Died)
- Manuel Basulto y Jiménez (18 Dec 1919 – 12 Aug 1936 Died)
- Rafael García y García de Castro (29 Dec 1942 – 9 May 1953 Appointed Archbishop of Granada)
- Felix Romero Menjibar (16 Jan 1954 – 2 Jul 1970 Appointed Archbishop of Valladolid)
- Miguel Peinado Peinado (30 Apr 1971 – 31 May 1988 Retired)
- Santiago García Aracil (31 May 1988 – 9 Jul 2004 Appointed Archbishop of Mérida-Badajoz)
- Ramón del Hoyo López (19 May 2005 – 9 April 2016)
- Amadeo Rodríguez Magro (9 April 2016 – 25 October 2021)
- Sebastián Chico Martínez (25 October 2021 – present)

== See also ==
- La Magdalena church, Jaén
- Roman Catholicism in Spain

== Sources ==
- Catholic Hierarchy
