= Skypower Express Airways =

Nigerian airline

IATA	ICAO	Call sign
NB	EAN	Nigeria Express
- Founded: 1985
- Ceased operations: 2007
- Fleet size: 2 Embraer EMB 110 Bandeirante
- Headquarters: Kaduna, Nigeria
- Key people: Mohammed Joji (Chief Executive Officer)

Skypower Express Airways was an airline based in Kaduna in Nigeria. It operated scheduled and charter services in Nigeria and neighboring countries.

== History ==
Sky Power Express was initially established in 1982 and then incorporated as Express Airways Nigeria on the 19 July 1985. It is owned by Mohammed Joji (85% and Chief Executive), Dr Sale Joji (5%). The Nigerian government set a deadline of 30 April 2007 for all airlines operating in the country to re-capitalise or be grounded, in an effort to ensure better services and safety. Seven airlines failed to meet the deadline and as a result would not be allowed fly in Nigeria's airspace with effect from 30 April 2007. These were: ADC Airlines, Fresh Air, Sosoliso Airlines, Albarka Air, Chrome Air Service, Dasab Airlines and Space World Airline. The affected airlines would only fly when they satisfied the Nigerian Civil Aviation Authority (NCAA)’s criteria in terms of re-capitalization and thus be re-registered for operation. Skypower was allowed flying Nigerian airspace.

== Fleet ==
As of August 2006 the Skypower Express Airways fleet included:

- 2 Embraer EMB 110P1 Bandeirante
