= Juan Suárez Carvajal =

Roman Catholic prelate (1485–1584)

Most Reverend Pablo de Torres
- Bishop of Lugo
- Church: Catholic Church
- Diocese: Diocese of Lugo
- In office: 1539–1561
- Predecessor: Martín Tristán Calvete
- Successor: Francisco Delgado López (bishop)

Personal details
- Born: 1485 Talavera de la Reina, Spain
- Died: October 6, 1584 (age 99)

Juan Suárez Carvajal (1485 – October 6, 1584) was a Roman Catholic prelate who served as Bishop of Lugo (1539–1561).

== Biography ==
Juan Suárez Carvajals was born in Talavera de la Reina, Spain, in 1485. On September 9, 1539, he was selected by the King of Spain and confirmed by Pope Paul III as Bishop of Lugo. On March 10, 1561 he retired from his position as bishop and he died on October 6, 1584.

While bishop, he was the principal consecrator of Bernardino de Carmona, Auxiliary Bishop of Santiago de Compostela (1553).

== External links and additional sources ==
- Cheney, David M. "Diocese of Lugo". Catholic-Hierarchy.org. (for Chronology of Bishops) ^{[self-published]}
- Chow, Gabriel. "Diocese of Lugo (Spain)". GCatholic.org. (for Chronology of Bishops) ^{[self-published]}

Religious titles
| Preceded by Martín Tristán Calvete | Bishop of Lugo; 1539–1561 | Succeeded by Francisco Delgado López (bishop) |
