= Alonso Eans =

Galician clergyman

Alonso Eans, was a medieval Galician clergyman.

Catholic Church titles
Preceded by Johan Martins	Bishop of Lugo; 1281–1284	Succeeded by Arias Soga
