= Juan Carvajal (footballer) =

Chilean footballer (born 1986)

Personal information
- Full name: Juan Eduardo Carvajal Cerda
- Date of birth: 2 December 1989 (age 36)
- Place of birth: Copiapó, Chile
- Height: 1.75 m (5 ft 9 in)
- Position: Midfielder

Team information
- Current team: Copiapó
- Number: 5

Youth career
- 2004–2006: Cobresal

Senior career*
Years	Team	Apps	(Gls)
2006	Cobresal	7	(0)
2007–2008	Copiapó	45	(6)
2009	San Marcos de Arica	24	(1)
2010–	Copiapó	42	(0)
2012–2013	→ Cobresal (loan)	27	(0)
- * Club domestic league appearances and goals as of 24 February 2013 ‡ National team caps and goals as of 15 November 2012

Juan Eduardo Carvajal Cerda (born 5 September 1986) is a Chilean footballer who currently plays for Deportes Copiapó in the Primera B de Chile.
