= Fernando de Valdés y Salas =

Spanish bishop, censor, inquisitor and politician

- Archbishop of Seville
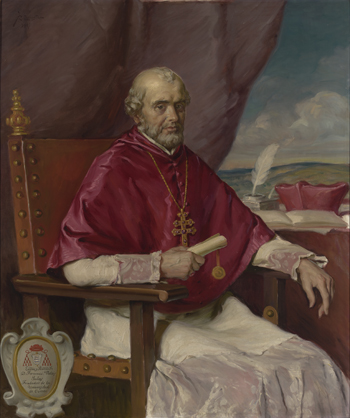
- Portrait of Fernando de Valdés y Salas, work of José Ramón Zaragoza. Located in the paranymph of the University of Oviedo
- Church: Catholic Church
- Archdiocese: Archdiocese of Seville
- In office: 27 August 1546 – 9 December 1568
- Predecessor: García de Loaysa
- Successor: Gaspar de Zúñiga y Avellaneda
- Previous posts: Bishop of Sigüenza (1539-1546); Bishop of León (1539); Bishop of Oviedo (1532-1539); Bishop of Ourense (1530-1532); Bishop of Elne (1529-1530)

Orders
- Consecration: 18 October 1529 by Francisco Mendoza

Personal details
- Born: 1483 Salas, Kingdom of León, Crown of Castile
- Died: 9 December 1568 (aged 84–85) Madrid, Crown of Castile

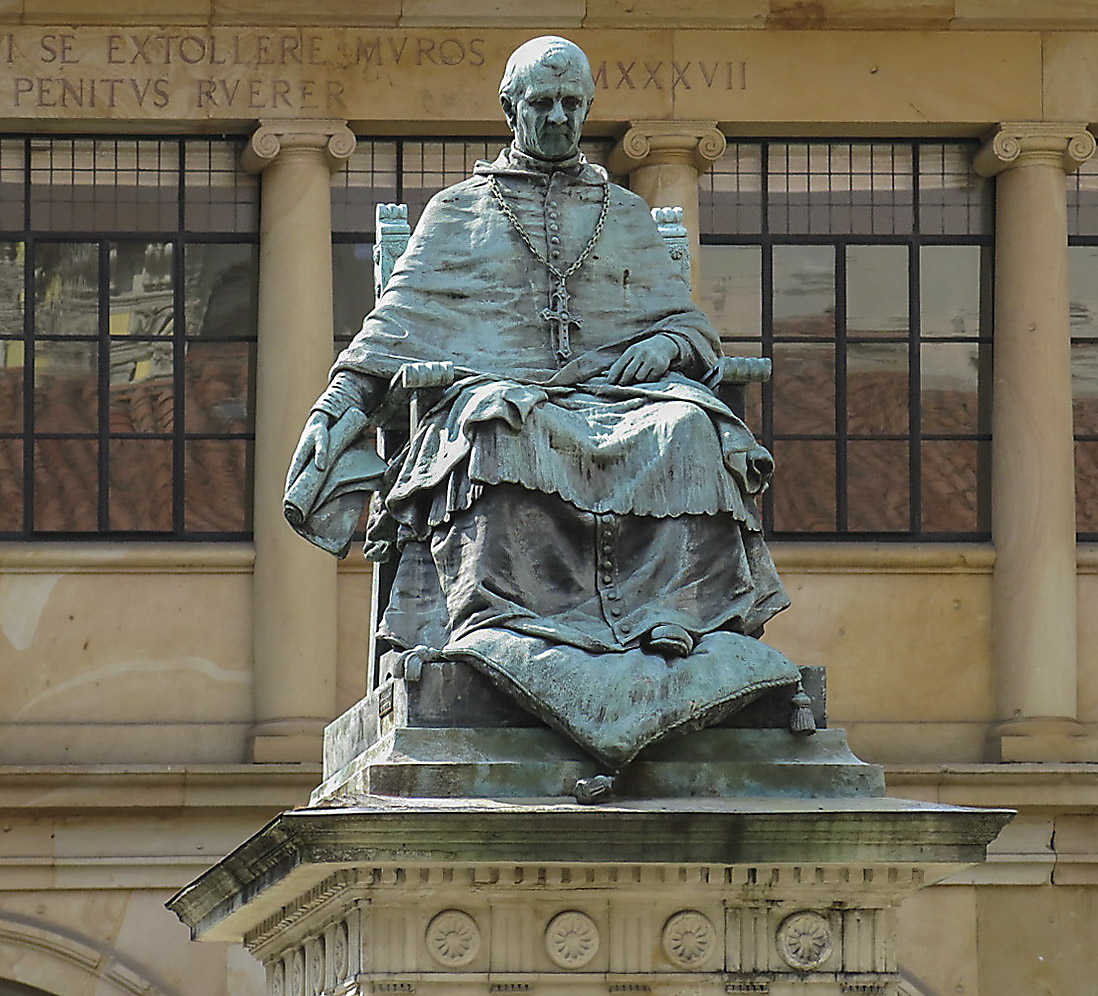
The statue of founder Fernando de Valdés Salas in the courtyard of University of Oviedo library.

Fernando de Valdés y Salas (Salas, Asturias, 1483 – Madrid, 1568) was a Spanish churchman and jurist, professor of canon law at the University of Salamanca, and later its chancellor.

== Biography ==
He was member of the Supreme Council of the Spanish Inquisition from 1516, Bishop of Ourense (1529–1532), Bishop of Oviedo (July 1532 – May 1539), Bishop of León, (1539), Bishop of Sigüenza (October 1539 – August 1546), Archbishop of Seville (August 1546 – December 1566), President of the Royal Council of Castile, Inquisitor General/Grand Inquisitor (1547–1566). He published an "Index of Forbidden books" in 1559, including a number of influential Catholic authors such as Erasmus of Rotterdam, Louis of Granada, Francisco de Osuna, and Francisco de Borja.

He tried to clean out heterodox people, associated to Jewish and Muslim "conversos" and Erasmist and Lutheran circles, from the high nobility and the high ecclesiastical positions around Valladolid and Sevilla, even prosecuting the Archbishop of Toledo Bartolomé Carranza.

== Bibliography ==
- J. R. ALONSO PEREIRA, "Historia General de la Arquitectura en Asturias". Colegio Oficial de Arquitectos de Asturias. Gran Enciclopedia Asturiana, (1996).(Gijón), Edit. Silverio Cañada, ISBN 978-84-7286-362-0, 366 pages, (In Spanish)

Catholic Church titles
Preceded by García de Loaysa	Grand Inquisitor of Spain; 1547–1566	Succeeded by Diego de Espinosa
