= Manuel Arias y Porres =

Spanish Catholic prelate and statesman

His Eminence Manuel Arias y Porres O.S.H.
- Archbishop of Seville
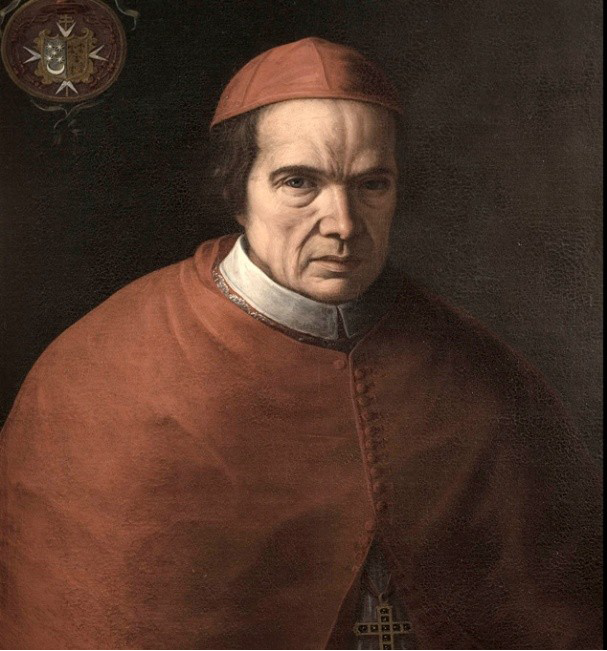
- Portrait of Cardinal Manuel Arias y Porres, early 18th century (Archbishop's Palace, Seville)
- Church: Catholic Church
- Archdiocese: Seville
- Appointed: 3 April 1702
- Term ended: 16 November 1717
- Predecessor: Jaime de Palafox y Cardona
- Successor: Felipe Antonio Gil Taboada

Orders
- Consecration: 3 April 1702
- Created cardinal: 18 May 1712 by Pope Clement XI
- Rank: Cardinal-Priest

Personal details
- Born: 1 November 1638 Alaejos, Spain
- Died: 16 November 1717 (aged 79) Seville, Spain
- Coat of arms

Frey Manuel Arias y Porres (Alaejos, 1 November 1638 - Seville, 16 November 1717) was a Spanish Catholic prelate and statesman, Knight of the Order of Malta, Hieronymite monk, president of the Council of Castile during the reigns of Charles II and Philip V, Archbishop of Seville and Cardinal.

== Biography ==
=== Knight of Malta ===
At the age of 14 he went to Malta, where serving as a Knight of the Order of Saint John, he studied philosophy, theology and law. With the support of the Grand Master, Rafael Cotoner, in 1662 he was appointed vice-chancellor of the Order, and later Pope Innocent XI granted him the rank of Grand Bailiff. During his militancy in the Order, he was granted the encomiendas of Benavente (1668), El Viso (1674), Los Yébenes (1676) and Quiroga (1683).

=== President of Castile in the service of Charles II ===
In 1689 he returned to Spain, where King Charles II appointed him Ambassador to Portugal, a position that Arias declined, citing his newly acquired religious status, as he had just entered the Order of Saint Jerome. He received the Presidency of the Council of Castile between December 1692 and January 1696, when he resigned and retired to El Viso. In April 1699, as a result of a popular revolt that occurred in Madrid, known as the Mutiny of the cats (Los Gatos), in which the Count of Oropesa was deposed from the presidency of Castile, Arias was recalled to replace him.

During the last years of the reign of Charles II, and in the absence of heirs, he joined the Bourbon party with the Count of Harcourt, Cardinal Portocarrero and Francisco Ronquillo Briceño, in opposition to the Austrian party headed by the Count of Oropesa and the Admiral of Castile. Upon the death of the King, according to the provisions of the royal will, he formed part of the Regency Board that assumed the government of the Kingdom, until the arrival of the new King.

=== Reign of Philip V: Archbishop of Seville and Cardinal ===
With the accession of Philip V to the throne of Spain, Arias remained at Court in the service of the new King. During the King's absences in the War of Spanish Succession, Arias was a member of the governing council that assisted Queen Elisabeth Farnese.

In 1702, he was named Archbishop of Seville, although he received dispensation to be absent from the Archdiocese due to his work as President of the Council of Castile. He held this position until the intrigues of the Count of Montellano, José de Solís y Valderrábano, led to his removal from Court in November 1703.

He was created Cardinal in pectore by Pope Clement XI in the consistory of 18 May 1712, and his appointment was made public on 30 January 1713, although he never travelled to Rome to receive the title.

He died in Seville at the age of 79 and was buried in the Church of the Sagrario in this same city.

Catholic Church titles
Preceded by Jaime de Palafox y Cardona	Archbishop of Seville; 1702–1717	Succeeded by Felipe Antonio Gil de Taboada
Political offices
Preceded by Antonio Ibáñez de la Riva Herrera	President of the Council of Castile; 1692–1696	Succeeded by Antonio de Argüelles y Valdés
Preceded by Count of Oropesa	President of the Council of Castile; 1699–1703	Succeeded by José de Solís y Valderrábano
