= List of Spanish regents =

This is a list of Spanish regents, a regent, from the Latin regens "one who reigns", is a person selected to act as head of state (ruling or not) because the ruler is a minor, not present, or debilitated. (Note: The Oxford English Dictionary defines the term as "A person appointed to administer a State because the Monarch is a minor, is absent or is incapacitated.")

== Reign of Joanna, Queen of Castile and Aragon ==
Image	Personal Coat of Arms	Name	Regency start	Regency end
Regencies (Governor of the Realms), disability of Queen Joanna.
		Crown of Castile: Ferdinand II of Aragon	26 November 1504; Death of Queen Isabella the Catholic.	27 June 1506; Queen Joanna and King Philip I's arrival.
		Crown of Castile: Ferdinand II of Aragon	17 August 1507; Death of King Philip I of Castile in September 1506, followed by the recognition of the incapacity of Queen Joanna.	23 January 1516
		Crown of Castile: Cardinal Francisco Jiménez de Cisneros	23 January 1516; Death of King Ferdinand II.	19 September 1517; King Charles I's arrival.
		Crown of Aragon: Alonso de Aragón; Queen's Guardian and Germaine of Foix; Lieutenant General	23 January 1516; Death of King Ferdinand II.	29 July 1518; Charles I become co-monarch with his mother Queen Joanna.

== Reign of Charles I ==
Image	Personal Coat of Arms	Name	Regency start	Regency end
Regencies (Governor of the Realms) during Charles I's absences.
		Cardinal Adriaan Florenszoon Boeyens	May 1520	January 1522; Election as Pope.
		Eleanor of Austria	January 1522	July 1522 King Charles I's arrival.
		Empress Isabella	July 1529	April 1533; King Charles I's arrival.
		Empress Isabella	April 1535	December 1536; King Charles I's arrival.
		Empress Isabella	July 1538	1 May 1539; Death of Empress Isabella.
		Juan Pardo de Tavera (de facto)	November 1539; Charles I's absences.	November 1541; King Charles I's arrival.
		Prince Philip (de jure)	November 1539; Charles I's absences.	November 1541; King Charles I's arrival.
		Prince Philip	May 1543	1548
		Archduke Maximilian and Maria of Austria	1 October 1548; Charles I and Prince Philip's absences.	12 July 1551; Prince Philip's arrival.
		Prince Philip	12 July 1551	July 1554
		Joanna of Austria, Princess Dowager of Portugal	July 1554; Charles I and Prince Philip's absences.	8 September 1559; King Philip II's arrival. (Became monarch in 1556)

== Reign of Philip III ==
Image	Name	Regency start	Regency end
Regency (Governor of the Realms) as President of the Council of Castile during King Philip III's visit to Portugal.
	Fernando de Acevedo	22 April 1619	4 December 1619

== Reign of Charles II ==
Image	Personal Coat of Arms	Name	Regency start	Regency end
Queen Regent during the minority of King Charles II.
		Mariana of Austria	17 September 1665; Death of King Philip IV.	6 November 1675; Charles II's majority.
Regency (Lieutenant General of the Realms) during King Charles II's illness.
		Cardinal Luis Fernández de Portocarrero	29 October 1700	1 November 1700; Death of King Charles II.

== Reign of Philip V ==
Image	Name	Regency start	Regency end
Government Board of the Realms.
	Maria Anna of Neuburg (Queen Dowager); Cardinal Portocarrero; Fray Manuel Arias y Porres (President of the Council of Castile); Fernando de Aragón y Moncada (President of the Council of Aragon); Fadrique Álvarez de Toledo y Ponce de León (President of the Council of Italy); Juan Domingo Méndez de Haro y Sotomayor (President of the Council of Flanders); Rodrigo Manuel Manrique de Lara (Council of State); Baltasar de Mendoza y Sandoval (Grand Inquisitor); Francisco Pimentel y de Herrera, Count of Benavente	1 November 1700	18 February 1701; King Philip V's arrival.

Image	Personal Coat of Arms	Name	Regency start	Regency end
Regency (General Governor of the Realms) during King Philip V's absence.
		Cardinal Luis Fernández de Portocarrero	1 September 1701	17 January 1703

== Reign of Charles III ==
Image	Personal Coat of Arms	Name	Regency start	Regency end
Queen Regent during King Charles III's absence.
		Elisabeth Farnese	10 August 1759; Death of King Ferdinand VI.	9 December 1759; King Charles III's arrival.

== First Reign of Ferdinand VII ==
Image	Personal Coat of Arms	Name	Regency start	Regency end
Supreme Board of Government, French invasion (King Ferdinand VII's absence). President:
		Infante Antonio Pascual of Spain	10 April 1808	4 May 1808; Infante Antonio Pascual's departure to Bayonne.

== French Invasion and Reign of Joseph Bonaparte ==
Image	Personal Coat of Arms	Name	Regency start	Regency end
Lieutenant General of the Realm.
		Joachim Murat	4 May 1808	20 July 1808; King Joseph's arrival.

Image	Personal Coat of Arms	Name	Regency start	Regency end
Emperor's Lieutenant General in Spain.
		Jean-de-Dieu Soult	1 July 1813; King Joseph's departure.	11 December 1813; Treaty of Valençay

== Second Reign of Ferdinand VII ==
=== Peninsular War ===
Regencies at Peninsular War, against the French invaders.
Image	Name	Regency start	Regency end
Supreme Central and Governing Board of the Realm. Presidents:
	José Moñino, 1st Count of Floridablanca (Acting)	25 September 1808	1 October 1808
	José Moñino, 1st Count of Floridablanca (Acting)	1 October 1808	30 December 1808
	Vicente Joaquín Osorio de Moscoso y Guzmán, 15th Marquis of Astorga (Acting)	30 December 1808	1 May 1809
	Vicente Joaquín Osorio de Moscoso y Guzmán, 15th Marquis of Astorga (Acting)	1 May 1809	1 November 1809
	Juan Acisclo de Vera	1 November 1809	31 January 1810
Regency Board of Spain and the Indies. Presidents:
	Francisco Javier Castaños	1 February 1810	29 May 1810
	Pedro de Quevedo y Quintano	29 May 1810	26 September 1810
	Francisco Saavedra de Sangronis	27 September 1810	28 October 1810
	Pedro Agar y Bustillo	28 October 1810	8 December 1810
	Joaquín Blake y Joyes	8 December 1810	8 April 1811
	Pedro Agar y Bustillo	8 April 1811	8 August 1811
	Gabriel de Císcar y Císcar	8 August de 1811	8 December de 1811
	Pedro Agar y Bustillo	8 December 1811	22 January 1812
Regency Council of the Realm. Presidents:
	Joaquín de Mosquera y Figueroa	22 January 1812	15 June 1812
	Pedro de Alcántara Álvarez de Toledo, 13th Duke of the Infantado	15 June 1812	15 December 1812
	Juan María de Villavicencio	15 December 1812	8 March 1813
	Luis María de Borbón y Vallabriga, 14th Count of Chinchón (Acting)	8 March 1813	22 March 1813
	Luis María de Borbón y Vallabriga, 14th Count of Chinchón (Acting)	22 March 1813	10 May 1814; King Ferdinand VII's arrival.

=== Liberal Triennium and Hundred Thousand Sons of St. Louis Intervention ===
Regencies during the Hundred Thousand Sons of St. Louis Intervention.
Enshrined in the Cortes (Spanish Parliament)
Image	Name	Regency start	Regency end
Provisional Regency Council of the Realm. President:
	Cayetano Valdés y Flores	11 June 1823; King Ferdinand VII prisoner of the Cortes.	15 June 1823
Enshrined in the French army
Image	Name	Regency start	Regency end
Provisional Government Board of Spain and the Indies. President:
	Francisco de Eguía	9 April 1823	25 May 1823
Regency Council of the Realm during King's Captivity. President:
	Pedro de Alcántara Álvarez de Toledo, 13th Duke of the Infantado	25 May 1823	1 October 1823; King Ferdinand VII's liberation.

== Reign of Isabella II ==
Regencies during the minority of Queen Isabella II:
Image	Personal Coat of Arms	Name	Regency start	Regency end
Queen Regent
		Maria Christina of the Two Sicilies	29 September 1833; Death of King Ferdinand VII.	12 October 1840; Queen Regent's deposition.
Provisional Regency of the Realm. President:
		Baldomero Espartero	12 October 1840	10 May 1841
Regent of the Realm
		Baldomero Espartero	10 May 1841	23 July 1843; General Espartero's deposition and Queen Isabella II's majority.

== Interregnum and Reign of Amadeo ==
Image	Name	Term start	Term end
Provisional Government and Executive Power. (Note: The official name of " Executive Power " between 1868 and 1874, designates a transitory and undefined authority without a constitutional configuration.) President:
	Francisco Serrano y Domínguez	(President of the Provisional Government); 8 October 1868; Queen Isabella II's deposition.	25 February 1869
	Francisco Serrano y Domínguez	(President of the Executive Power); 25 February 1869	18 June 1869

Image	Personal Coat of Arms	Name	Regency start	Regency end
Regent of the Realm				
		Francisco Serrano y Domínguez	18 June 1869	2 January 1871; King Amadeo's arrival.

== Reign of Alfonso XII ==
Image	Personal Coat of Arms	Name	Regency start	Regency end
Regency Ministry during King Alfonso XII's absence. President:
		Antonio Cánovas del Castillo	31 December 1874; Bourbon dynasty restored.	14 January 1875; King Alfonso XII's arrival.

== Reign of Alfonso XIII ==
Image	Personal Coat of Arms	Name	Regency start	Regency end
Queen Regent after the death of Alfonso XII (who died while she was pregnant) and during the minority of King Alfonso XIII (who was born king).
		Maria Christina of Austria; Death of King Alfonso XII.	26 November 1885	17 May 1902; King Alfonso XIII's majority.

== Dictatorship of Francisco Franco ==
Image	Personal coat of arms	Name	Regency start	Regency end
National interregnum under the Francoist regime.
		Francisco Franco, Caudillo of Spain	26 July 1947; Restoration of the "Kingdom of Spain"	20 November 1975; Died
		Alejandro Rodríguez de Valcárcel	20 November 1975; As President of the Regency Council after Franco's death.	22 November 1975; Juan Carlos became monarch.

=== Acting regents ===
Image	Name	Regency start	Regency end
Regency Council during Francisco Franco's visit to Portugal.
	Esteban de Bilbao Eguía; Leopoldo Eijo y Garay; Miguel Ponte y Manso de Zúñiga	22 October 1949	27 October 1949

Image	Personal Coat of arms	Name	Regency start	Regency end
Acting Head of State during Francisco Franco's illness.
		Juan Carlos, Prince of Spain	19 July 1974	2 September 1974
		Juan Carlos, Prince of Spain	30 October 1975	20 November 1975; Death of Francisco Franco.

== See also ==
- Regency
- List of regents
- List of heads of state of Spain
- List of Spanish monarchs
- President of Spain
- Royal Consorts of Spain
- Prime Minister of Spain
- Spanish monarchy
- Kings of Spain family tree
