= Antonio Ibáñez de la Riva Herrera =

18th-century Roman Catholic bishop

Most Reverend Antonio Ibáñez de la Riva Herrera
- Archbishop of Zaragoza
- Church: Catholic Church
- In office: 1687–1710
- Predecessor: Diego de Castrillo
- Successor: Manuel Pérez Araciel y Rada

Orders
- Consecration: 8 Jul 1685 by Alfonso Enríquez de Santo Tomás

Personal details
- Born: 1633
- Died: 3 September 1710 (aged 76–77)

Antonio Ibáñez de la Riva Herrera (1633–1710) was a Spanish bishop who was Grand Inquisitor of Spain from 1709 to 1710.

== Biography ==
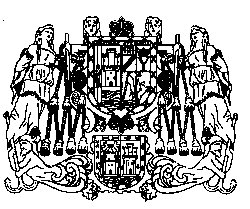
Coat of arms of Antonio Ibáñez de la Riva Herrera.

Antonio Ibáñez de la Riva Herrera was born in Solares in Cantabria. He studied at the University of Salamanca and was then ordained as a priest. He became a canon of the Colegio Mayor de San Ildefonso and then of Málaga Cathedral.

He became Bishop of Ceuta in 1685. On 8 Jul 1685, he was consecrated bishop by Alfonso Enríquez de Santo Tomás, Bishop of Málaga. In 1687, he was translated, becoming Archbishop of Zaragoza.

Charles II of Spain named him President of the Council of Castile in 1690 and he held that post until 1692. He served as Viceroy and Captain General of the Kingdom of Aragon, the first from 1693 to 1696. He held a synod in Zaragoza in 1697. With the outbreak of the War of the Spanish Succession in 1701, he again served as Viceroy and Captain General of Aragon; under his leadership, Aragon remained loyal to Philip V of Spain. As Grand Inquisitor of Spain, he headed the Spanish Inquisition from 1709 to 1710.

He died in Madrid in 1710. In 1780, his remains were transferred to La Seo Cathedral in Zaragoza.

== Episcopal succession ==
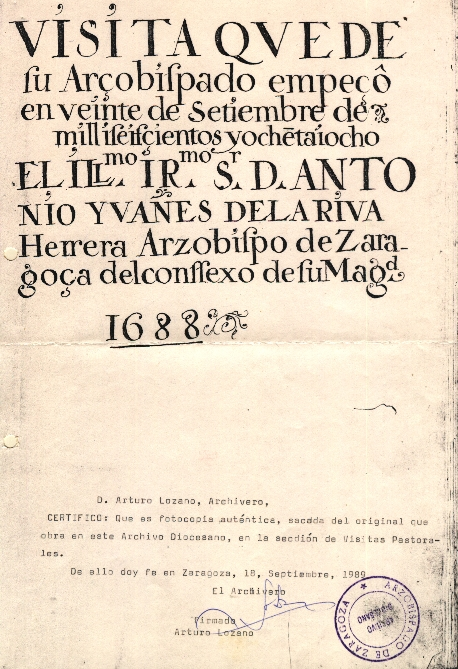
Visitation Articles issued by Antonio Ibáñez de la Riva Herrera.

While bishop, he was the principal consecrator of:
- Jeronimo López, Bishop of Barbastro (1696);
- Luis Pueyo Abadía, Bishop of Albarracin (1700);
- Lorenzo Armengual del Pino de la Mota, Titular Bishop of Dionysias and Auxiliary Bishop of Zaragoza (1701);
- Lamberto Manuel López, Bishop of Teruel (1701);
- Blas Serrate, Bishop of Tarazona (1702);
- Mateo Foncillas Mozárabe, Bishop of Jaca (1705);
- Juan Ruiz y Simón, Bishop of Islas Canarias (1706); and
- Pedro Gregorio Padilla, Bishop of Barbastro (1709).

Catholic Church titles
| Preceded by Luis de Ayllón | Bishop of Ceuta; 1685–1687 | Succeeded by Diego Ibáñez de la Madrid y Bustamente |
| Preceded by Diego de Castrillo | Archbishop of Zaragoza; 1687–1710 | Succeeded by Manuel Pérez Araciel y Rada |
| Preceded by Vidal Marín del Campo | Grand Inquisitor of Spain; 1709—1710 | Succeeded by Francesco del Giudice |
