= Palacio de Lorenzana =

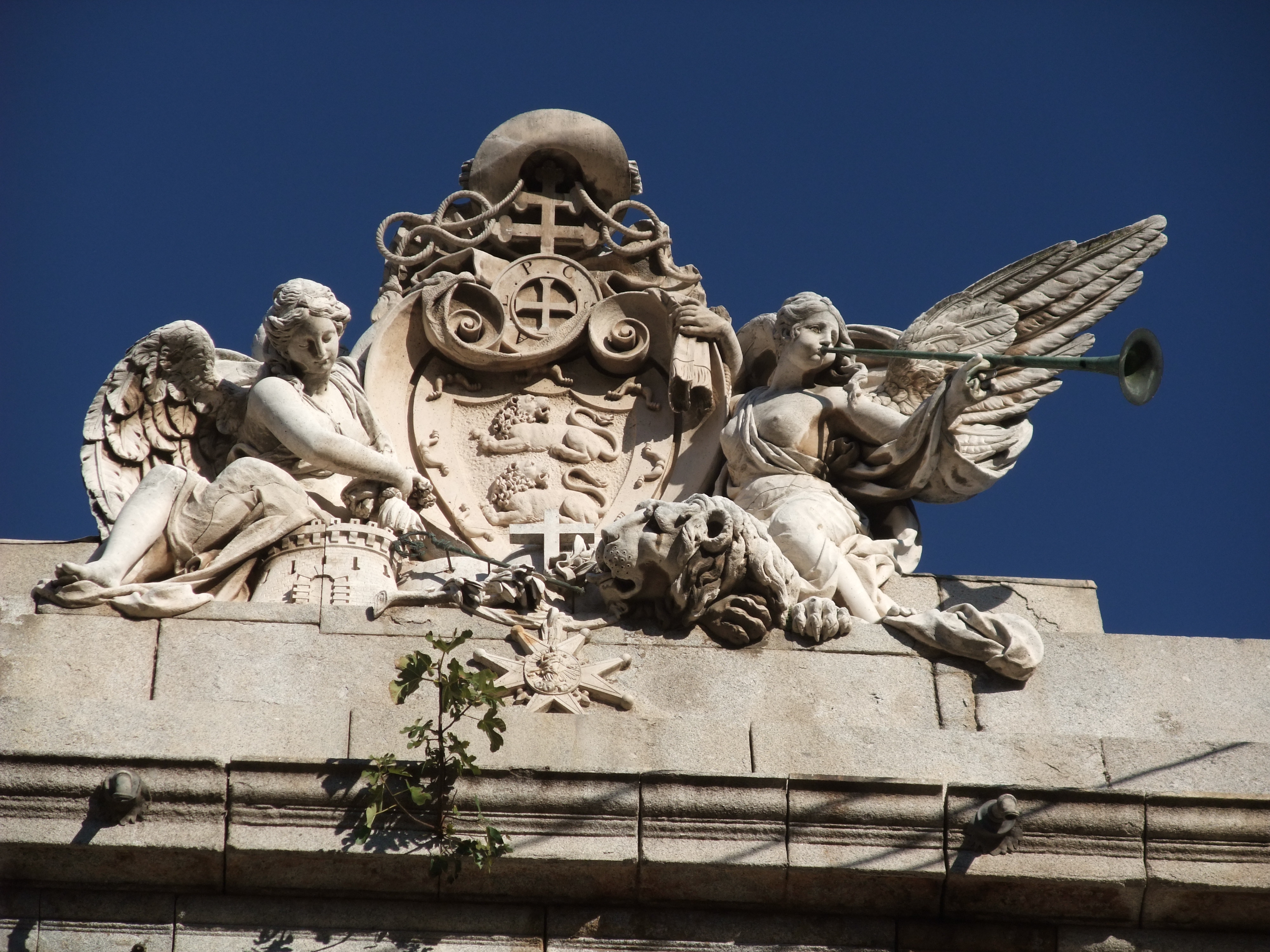
Arms of Cardinal Lorenzana in the facade

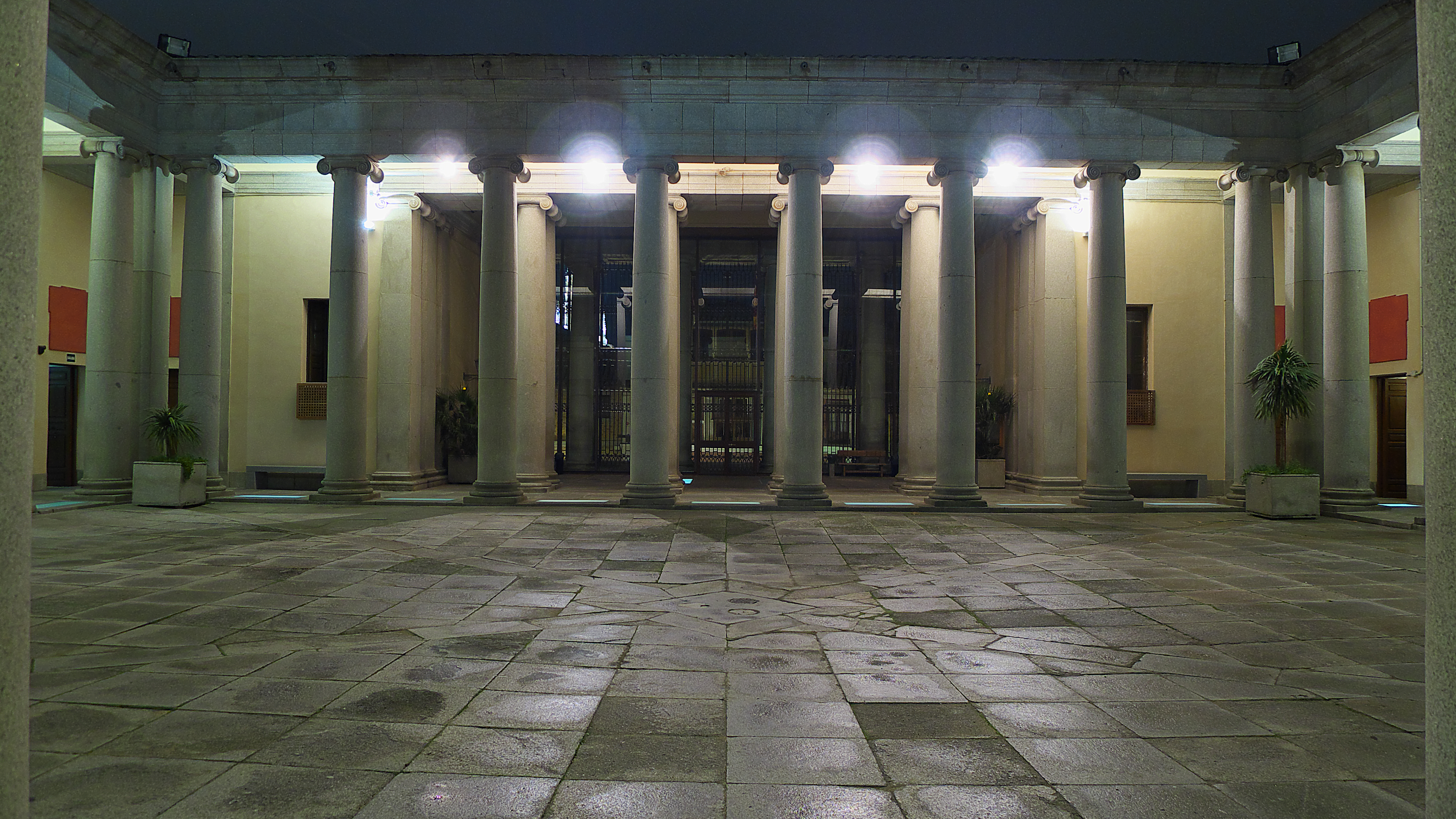
Courtyard

The Palacio de Lorenzana is a building in Toledo, Spain. It was designed by the Alicantean architect Ignacio Haan to house the University of Toledo (1485-1845). Today it is the Vice-Rectorate of Teaching and International Relations of the University of Castilla-La Mancha.

In addition to administrative units, it houses two research centers (Center for European Studies and Consumer Studies Center), the Center for Postgraduate Studies, the Student House, a university gymnasium and the classrooms of the University of Seniors "José Saramago".

During the reign of Charles III and enlightened spirit of the time, disentailed premises of the Holy Office were ceded, and in 1795 a separate building was constructed, separating itself from the former Colegio de Santa Catalina.

Promoted by Cardinal Francisco de Lorenzana, the building was built in Neoclassical style. On the main façade, in Ionic order, the two-story staircase and the two sculptures by Mariano de Salvatierra stand out, representing respectively Science and Fame. The cardinal's coat of arms crowns the façade, supported by two female allegories by Antonio Vinacer.

In the interior, the Auditorium and the Library open to a porticoed atrium, with 28 columns of Ionic order on which rests an entablature of granite.
