= Manuel Joaquín Álvarez de Toledo =

Spanish noble and politician

- 8th Count of Oropesa; 7th Count of Alcaudete; 7th Count of Deleytosa; 4th Marquis of Frechilla and Villarramiel; 3rd Marquis of Villar de Grajanejos; 4th Marquis of Jarandilla

Chief Minister of Spain
- In office 2 June 1685 – 25 June 1691
- Monarch: Charles II
- Preceded by: Juan Francisco de la Cerda, 8th Duke of Medinaceli
- Succeeded by: Office abolished temporaly (Note: After his dismissal, there wasn't any powerful person)
- In office 18 March 1698 – 9 May 1699
- Monarch: Charles II
- Preceded by: Office abolished temporaly
- Succeeded by: Luis Manuel Fernández de Portocarrero (as Valido)

President of the Council of Castile
- In office June 1684 – June 1690
- Monarch: Charles II
- Chief Minister: Duke of Medinaceli; Himself
- Preceded by: Juan Asensio Barrios
- Succeeded by: Antonio Ibáñez de la Riva Herrera
- In office 25 March 1698 – 9 May 1699
- Monarch: Charles II
- Chief Minister: Himself
- Preceded by: Antonio de Argüelles y Valdés
- Succeeded by: Manuel Arias y Porres

President of the Council of Italy
- In office June 1690 – 25 March 1698
- Monarch: Charles II
- Chief Minister: Himself
- Preceded by: Antonio Álvarez de Toledo y Enríquez de Ribera
- Succeeded by: Fadrique Alvarez de Toledo y Ponce de León
- Born: 27 February 1641; Pamplona, Kingdom of Navarre, Spanish Empire
- Died: 9 June 1705 (aged 64); Barcelona, Principality of Catalonia, Spanish Empire
- Spouse: Isabel Téllez Girón y Pacheco
- Issue: Diego Antonio Álvarez de Toledo Portugal; Josefa Antonia Álvarez de Toledo Portugal; Maria Petronilla Álvarez de Toledo Portugal; Vicente Pedro Álvarez de Toledo Portugal
Names
- Manuel Joaquín Álvarez de Toledo Portugal y Córdoba Monroy y Ayala; Manuel Joaquín Álvarez de Toledo Portugal y Pimentel
- Father: Duarte Fernando Álvarez de Toledo
- Mother: Ana Mónica Fernández de Córdoba y de Zúñiga

Manuel Joaquín Álvarez de Toledo (Pamplona, 6 January 1641 – Barcelona, 23 December 1707), 9th (sometimes 8th) Count of Oropesa, 7th Count of Alcaudete, etc., was a Spanish noble and politician, and Valido of King Charles II of Spain between 1685-1691 and 1698–1699. He also held the positions of Gentleman of His Majesty (Gentilhombre de Su Majestad), State Councilor (consejero de Estado), President of the Council of Castile and of the Council of Italy. He became a Grandee of Spain on 1 August 1690.

== Biography ==
He was born in an ancient Spanish noble family related to the House of Braganza. His father was Duarte Fernando Álvarez de Toledo, Viceroy of Navarra, Valencia and Sardinia and President of the Consejo de las Órdenes. His grandfather Fernando was a cousin of King John IV of Portugal.

=== 1st term (1685-1691) ===
The family ties of Oropesa to several illustrious noble houses opened the way to the highest ranks of power in Spain. He became a member of the State and War Councils (Consejos de Estado y de Guerra) on 10 August 1680, and became President of the Council of Castile in June 1684, with the unconditional support of the Duke of Medinaceli, who was then Valido or Prime Minister. When Medinaceli was dismissed in April 1685, Oropesa became his successor.

The government headed by the Count of Oropesa focused on putting into practice reforms aimed at the monetary system, agriculture and industry, the treasury, the social bureaucratic and the Church. The fact that it focused on these points is explained by the context of economic suffocation that the Monarchy was experiencing, the result of poor harvests and the constant state of war.

The first reform attempts were focused on the regularization and standardization of the currency, in order to improve the monetary reality of the country by giving the economy more liquidity. This reform of the monetary system was followed by the implementation of the productive system of the Monarchy, through the Royal and General Board of Trade, which sought to mobilize existing resources to expand and strengthen the Spanish industry. The Provincial Boards (Granada, Seville, Valencia, Barcelona) also helped, which revitalized the industrial fabric, which translated into a diversification of production and a substantial improvement in the price index.

The other large block of reforms was focused on the rationalization of income and expenses of the Monarchy. He reallocated and modified taxes (such as the Millones) and cut expenses and allocations as a way of alleviating the royal treasury. In the same way, he intervened in job speculation, cutting and abolishing many positions in the administration.

All of this was aimed at exerting greater tax pressure on the upper classes and decreasing that on the common people. Opposition by the upper classes, together with the enmity of Queen Maria Anna of Neuburg, led him to be the victim of different attacks that, in the end, led him to resign from his post in June 1691. Oropesa was ordered to stay away from Court and remain in his lordship of La Puebla de Montalbán.

=== 2nd term (1698-1699) ===
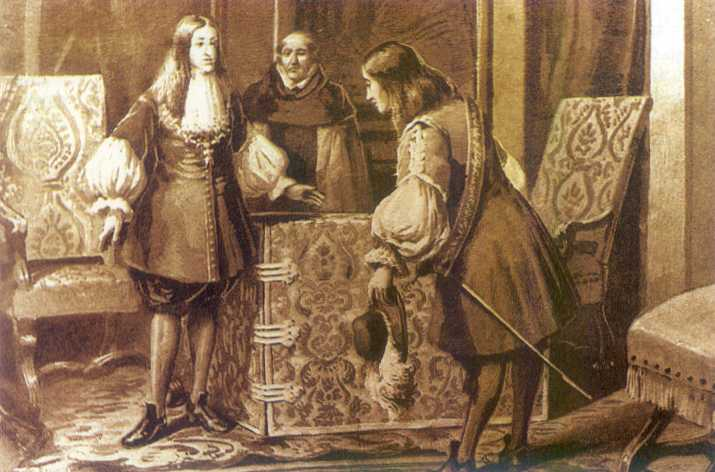
Engraving depicting the dismissal of the Count of Oropesa by King Carlos II after the Los Gatos Mutiny of 1699

He was called back to Court in 1696, reoccupying the presidency of the Council of Castile, and in March 1698 again became Valido and the most powerful person at Court.

Making it clear that King Carlos II would not have any children, he proposed Joseph Ferdinand of Bavaria as a candidate to succeed Carlos, but Joseph Ferdinand died in February 1699 and Count Oropesa then opted for Archduke Charles of Austria, in an attempt to continue the House of Habsburg. On this occasion, Oropesa now had the support of the queen consort Maria Anna of Neuburg.

The Count of Oropesa was strongly opposed by the supporters of the succession by the French House of Bourbon. To this opposition was added the ‘’Mutiny of the cats (Los Gatos)’’, a disturbance apparently unleashed by the people of Madrid in April 1699 as a result of the lack of bread. As a consequence, the count of Oropesa fell into disgrace again . He was replaced by Cardinal Portocarrero, a supporter of the succession by the French Bourbons.

King Charles II changed his will on 3 October 1700 in favor of Philip of Anjou, grandson of Louis XIV of France and his sister Maria Theresa of Spain, and died on 1 November 1700. In the following War of the Spanish Succession, Manuel Joaquín Álvarez Toledo first remained loyal to Philip of Anjou but in 1706 chose the side of the Austrian pretender. He died in 1707 in Barcelona before the end of the war.

=== Marriage and Children ===
On 27 July 1664, Manuel Joaquín Álvarez de Toledo married Isabel Téllez Girón y Pacheco, sister of Juan Francisco, Count of Puebla de Montalbán and Duke of Uceda by marriage. They had 4 children:

- Diego Antonio (1668-1734), Count of Alcaudete and colonel in the Austrian Army, Austrian Order of the Golden Fleece. No issue.
- Josefa Antonia (1681-1754), married Manuel Gaspar Gómez de Sandoval Téllez-Girón, 5th Duke of Uceda
- Maria Petronilla (Agustina de Jesús) (1681-1754), a nun.
- Vicente Pedro (1685-1729), 10th Count of Oropesa, Austrian Order of the Golden Fleece. Had issue.
