= Jerónimo Bautista Lanuza =

Spanish Dominican friar, bishop and writer

Servant of God Jeronimo Bautista Lanuza OP
- Bishop of Albarracín
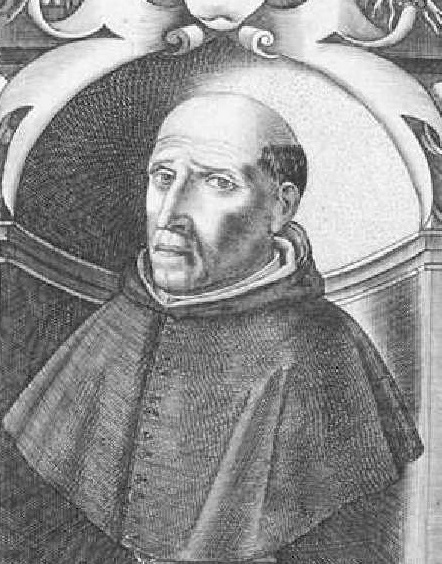
- Portrait of Jerónimo Bautista de Lanuza in the Vida del venerable y apostólico varón ... Don Fray Gerónimo Batista de Lanuza de la Orden de Predicadores, in Zaragoza, by Pedro Lanaja, 1648.
- See: Bishop of Albarracín
- Installed: 30 November 1616
- Term ended: 15 December 1624
- Other post: Bishop of Barbastro (1616–1622)

Orders
- Consecration: 30 November 1616 by: Pedro González de Mendoza, OFM; Juan Moriz Salazar; Martín Terrer Valenzuela, OSA

Personal details
- Born: Jerónimo Bautista de Lanuza; 3 January 1533 Híjar, Teruel, Spain
- Died: 15 December 1624 (aged 91) Albarracín, Teruel, Spain
- Buried: Cathedral-Basilica of Our Lady of the Pillar, Zaragoza
- Denomination: Catholic Church

Jerónimo Bautista Lanuza (3 January 1533 – 15 December 1624) was a Spanish Dominican friar, bishop and writer.

== Biography ==
Brother of Martín Bautista de Lanuza, 56th Justice of Aragon, Bautista was a student of Saint Luis Beltrán and soon stood out for his oratory. He professed in the Order of Preachers and was provincial of said Order. He was bishop of Barbastro and Albarracín.

He began his studies in philosophy in Zaragoza and from there he moved to Valencia, where he took the habit at the age of 16, having as his teacher the religious Luis Beltrán. After completing his studies in Philosophy, he went on to complete his studies in theology at the Convento de San Esteban, Salamanca, where before being ordained a priest he served as a Reader in the Arts, although what he mainly dedicated himself to was the study of the Holy Scriptures.

Although Bautista's humility led him to reject honorary and responsible positions on two occasions, he was forced, by virtue of his vow of obedience, to accept the position of Provincial of the territories of the former Crown of Aragon. He was considered one of the most eloquent orators of his century, and his many publications were translated into Latin and French.

After repeatedly renouncing the episcopal see, he finally accepted the See of Barbastro in 1616. He was consecrated at the Cathedral-Basilica of Our Lady of the Pillar on 30 November 30 of that year, taking possession of the see on 1 December, and made his solemn entry on the 21st of the same month.

During Bautista's episcopacy, without neglecting his pastoral duties, he devoted much of his time to the study of Sacred Scripture, resulting in the publication of several volumes that he made available to the preachers of the time. Other works to which he devoted himself zealously were related to the defense of the rights of the miter, for which he had to sustain several lawsuits related to the claims of the Royal Monastery of San Victorián over certain parishes, lawsuits that lasted through several episcopates.

In 1622, Bautista was transferred to the See of Albarracín, where he died on 15 December 1624, at the age of 71. He was buried in the presbytery of the Convent of Preachers in that city. Three years later, his remains were transferred to the Cathedral in Zaragoza.

== Works ==
Bautista wrote many works, usually in the form of homilies:

- Tratados evangélicos; Homilías in three volumes
- Memorial contra los Jesuitas
- Homilías sobre solemnidad del Santísimo Sacramento
- Homilías sobre Evangelios que la Iglesia Santa propone los días de Quaresma.

In 1790, the Salamancans Miguel Martel and Juan Justo García, supported by Juan Meléndez Valdés, eventually compiled and published his homilies in a compendium entitled Discursos predicables del Ilmo. Señor Don Gerónimo Bautista de Lanuza (1553-1624).

== Veneration ==
The reputation for holiness left by this distinguished prelate was well-known, and several synods held later included decrees opening the cause for beatification and proposals to convey the bishopric's wishes to the Pope. The martyrology of the Order of Preachers includes a lengthy portrait of him. For all these reasons, he is entitled to the title of Venerable, which many historians have bestowed upon him. In 1625, the Roman Catholic Archdiocese of Zaragoza officially opened his cause for beatification. Up to date, his cause has not progressed.
