= Agustín Rubín de Ceballos =

Catholic bishop

- Bishop of Jaén
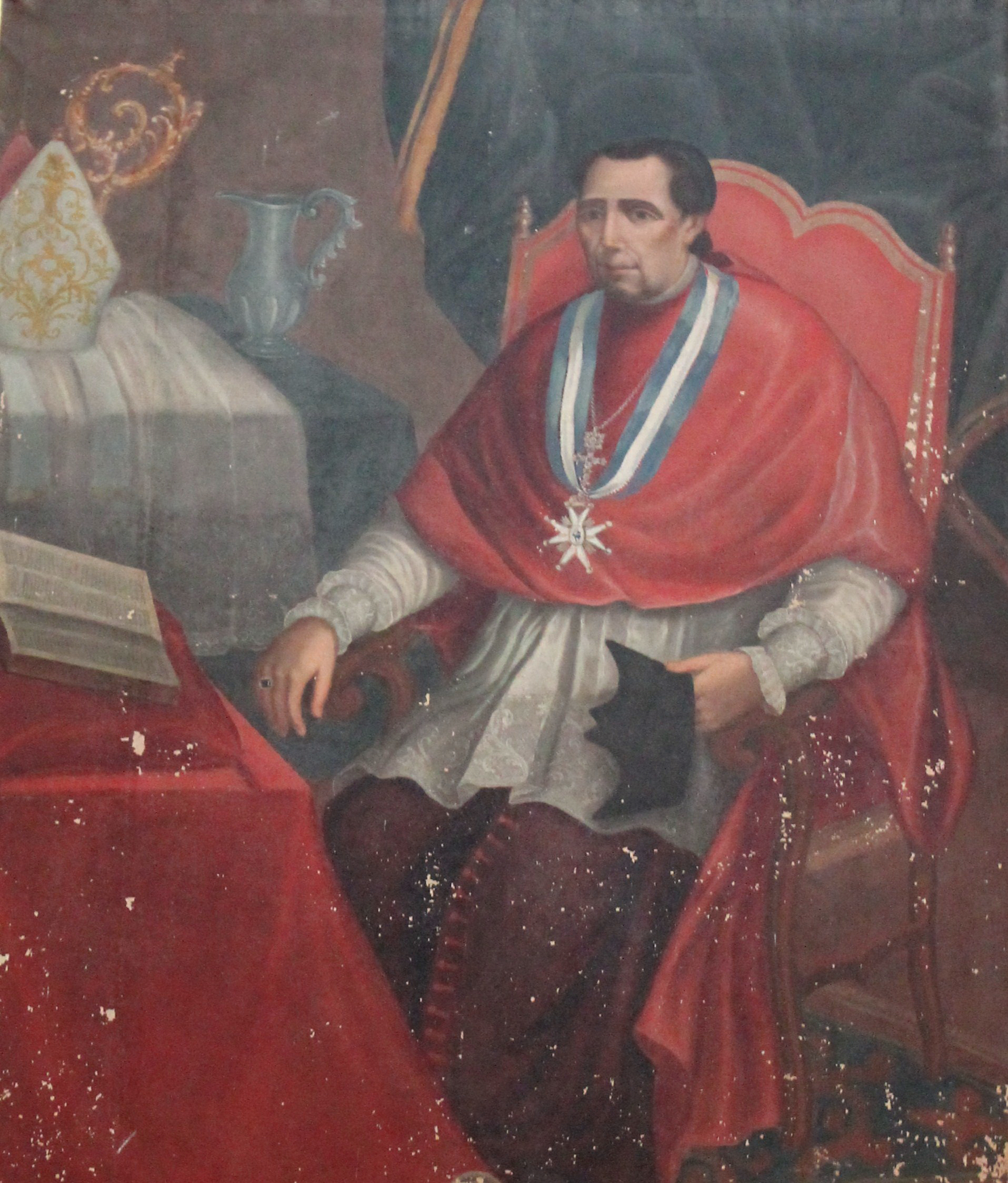
- Detail of the portrait of Bishop Agustín Rubín de Ceballos, located in the sacristy he commissioned for the Church of Santa María de la Asunción in Dueñas
- Church: Catholic Church
- Diocese: Diocese of Jaén
- In office: 18 September 1780 – 8 February 1793
- Predecessor: Antonio Gómez de la Torre y Jarabeitia
- Successor: Pedro Rubio-Benedicto Herrero

Orders
- Consecration: 26 November 1780 by Felipe Beltrán Serrano

Personal details
- Born: 24 June 1724 Dueñas, Kingdom of Castile
- Died: 8 February 1793 (aged 68) Madrid, Kingdom of Castile

Agustín Rubín de Ceballos (24 June 1724 – 8 February 1793) was a Spanish churchman who was Bishop of Jaén from 1780 to 1793 and Grand Inquisitor of Spain from 1784 to 1793.

== Biography ==
Agustín Rubin de Ceballos was born in Dueñas, Palencia on 24 June 1724. Pursuing a career in the Catholic Church, he became a canon of Cuenca Cathedral. In 1780, Charles III of Spain chose him to be Bishop of Jaén. He became Grand Inquisitor of Spain in 1784. In 1790, at the request of José Moñino, 1st Count of Floridablanca, he published a new Index of Prohibited Books to halt the spread of ideas associated with the French Revolution in Spain. He died in Madrid on 8 February 1794. His body was transferred to Jaén, Spain and he was buried in Jaén Cathedral.

Catholic Church titles
Preceded by Antonio Gómez de la Torre y Jaraveitia	Bishop of Jaén; 1780–1793	Succeeded by Pedro Rubio-Benedicto Herrero
Preceded by Felipe Beltrán Serrano	Grand Inquisitor of Spain; 1784–1793	Succeeded by Manuel Abad y Lasierra
