= Francisco Antonio de Lorenzana =

His Eminence Francisco Antonio de Lorenzana
- Cardinal, Archbishop of Toledo
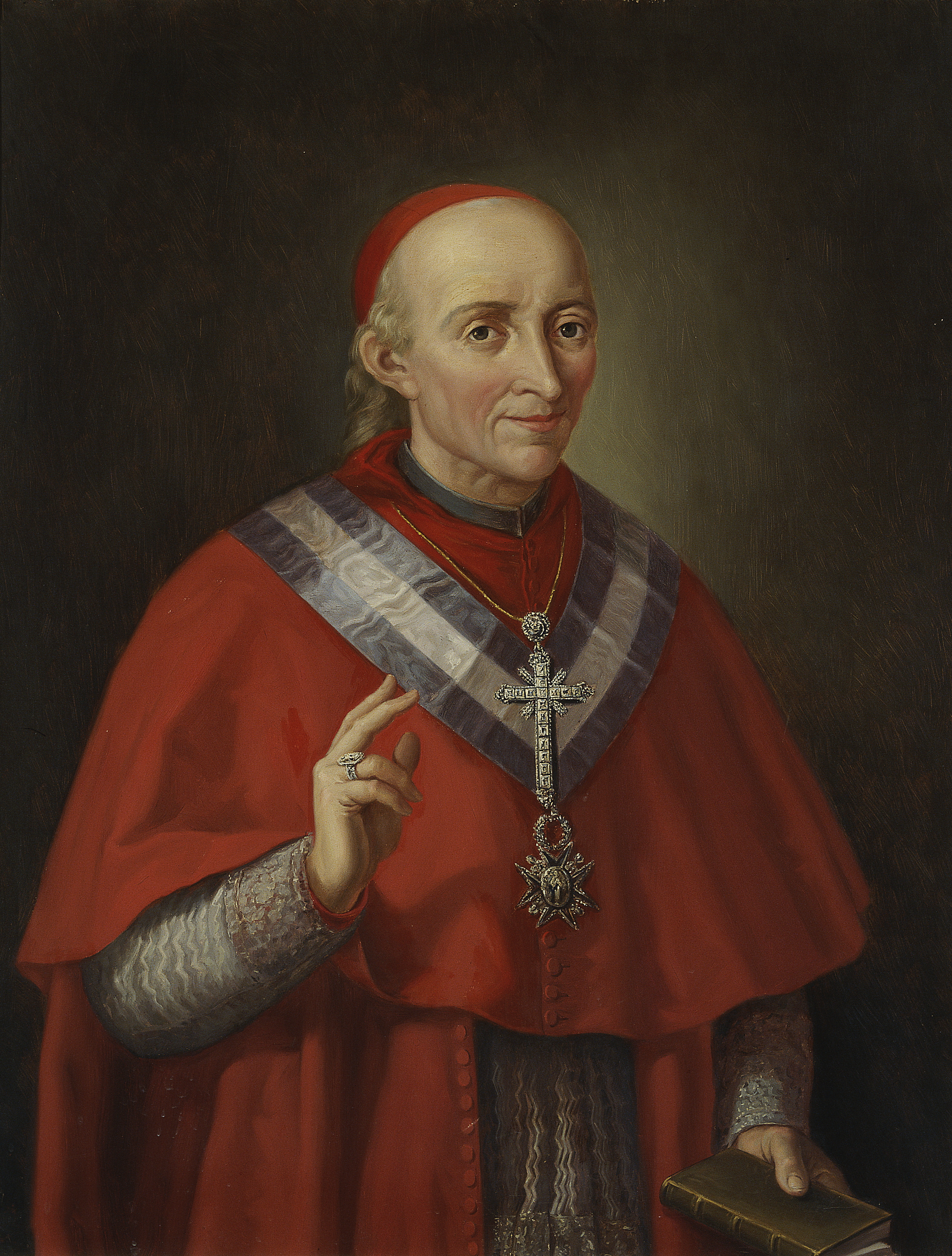
- Church: Roman Catholic Church
- Archdiocese: Toledo
- Appointed: 27 January 1771
- Term ended: 15 December 1800
- Predecessor: Luis II Fernandez de Cordoba
- Successor: Luis María de Borbón y Vallabriga
- Other posts: Cardinal-Priest of Santi XII Apostoli (1797–1804); Grand Inquisitor of Spain (1794–1797)
- Previous posts: Archbishop of Mexico (1766–1771); Bishop of Plasencia (1765–1766)

Orders
- Ordination: 1751
- Consecration: 11 August 1765 by Manuel Quintano Bonifaz
- Created cardinal: 30 March 1789 by Pope Pius VI
- Rank: Cardinal-Priest

Personal details
- Born: 22 September 1722 León, Spain
- Died: 17 April 1804 (aged 81) Rome, Papal States
- Coat of arms

Francisco Antonio de Lorenzana y Butrón (22 September 1722 – 17 April 1804) was a Catholic Cardinal, who had also earlier served as Archbishop of Mexico.

== Biography ==
After the completion of his studies at the Jesuit College of his native city, he entered the ecclesiastical state and was appointed, at an early date, to a canonry in Toledo. In 1765 he was named Bishop of Plasencia (not Palencia, as sometimes erroneously stated). The following year he was called upon to assume the difficult charge of the large Archdiocese of Mexico. He established an asylum for foundlings there at his own expense. He collected and published the acts of the first three provincial councils of Mexico held respectively in 1555, 1565, and 1585: Concilios provinciales, I, II, III, de Mexico (Mexico, 1769–70).

In 1771 he held the Fourth Mexican Provincial council synod, which was strongly regalist. (However its decrees, which he forwarded to Madrid for confirmation, were buried in the royal archives). He also brought together valuable historical documents relating to the secular and religious history of Mexico and published them in a richly illustrated work under the title, Historia de Nueva Espana (Mexico, 1770). According to one scholar, Lorenzana "became an outspoken critic of the crown's ecclesiastical policy and warned Charles III that his measures were Protestant heresies."

=== Archbishop of Toledo ===
In 1772 he was recalled to Spain and placed at the head of the Archdiocese of Toledo. He built a library for this city and collected the works of the principal writers of the Church of Toledo. These writings appeared in an edition, SS. Patrum Toletanorum opera (Madrid, 1782–93). He likewise published a new edition of the Gothic or Mozarabic Breviary, Breviarium Gothicum (Madrid, 1775), and Mozarabic Missal, Missale Gothicum (Rome, 1804). In the introductions to these publications he discussed the Mozarabic liturgy. Editions of Spanish conciliar decrees, the Roman Catechism, and the Canons of the Council of Trent also engaged his attention, and the works of Isidore of Seville were published at his expense by the Spanish Jesuit, Faustino Arévalo: S. Isidori Hispalensis Opera Omnia (Rome, 1797–1803).

Along with these scientific pursuits he actively carried on social work, founding hospitals and asylums. He converted a castle to a workhouse, subsidized the silk industry, and instructed parish priests help peasants on how to improve agriculture. Lorenzana was among other reformist clerics who put emphasis on improving welfare on earth and not focusing entirely on spiritual life after death.

During the French Revolution he was a generous benefactor of the exiled French clergy, over five hundred of whom he received into his own diocese.

In 1789 he was created cardinal by Pius VI, and from 1794 to 1797 he held the post of Grand Inquisitor. In 1797 was appointed envoy extraordinary from Spain to the Holy See, in which capacity he supported the pope in the difficulties attendant on the French invasion. On the death of Pius VI he made possible the holding of the conclave in Venice (1 December 1799) by providing traveling expenses for some of the cardinals who were penniless. He accompanied the newly elected pope, Pius VII, to Rome and in order to remain at his side resigned in 1800 his archiepiscopal see. No less active in Rome than in Mexico or Toledo, he was in 1801 one of the founders of a new Catholic Academy in Rome. An inheritance of 25,000 scudi which fell to him he assigned to the poor, whom he designated as his heirs.

As a regalist and attentive to the commands of the Count of Floridablanca whom Charles III gave complete authority to implement policy after 1776, Cardinal Lorenzana adhered to royal policy which saw smuggling, tax evasion, and other ways in which individuals avoided paying taxes as "a grave sin."

Lorenzana was an important figure in Mexican history as a collector and editor. He helped prepare for publication the works of Juan López de Velasco, Juan Suárez de Peralta and Martín Alfonso Tavila. He also published letters of conqueror Hernán Cortés, that included an account of Cortés's voyage to Baja California, as well as later expeditions there to 1769.

After Charles III's death in 1788, his son and successor Charles IV replaced Cardinal Lorenzana with Don Luis María Cardinal de Borbón y Vallabriga.

Catholic Church titles
Preceded by Manuel José Rubio y Salinas	Archbishop of Mexico; 1766 – 1772	Succeeded by Alonso Núñez de Haro y Peralta
Preceded by Manuel Abad y Lasierra	Grand Inquisitor of Spain; 1794–1797	Succeeded by Ramón José de Arce
