= Domenico Maria Marchese =

17th-century Roman Catholic bishop

Most Reverend Domenico Maria Marchese
- Bishop of Pozzuoli
- Church: Catholic Church
- Diocese: Diocese of Pozzuoli
- In office: 1688–1692
- Predecessor: Diego Ibáñez de la Madrid y Bustamente
- Successor: José Sanz de Villaragut

Orders
- Consecration: 8 Jun 1688 by Galeazzo Marescotti

Personal details
- Born: 2 Mar 1633
- Died: May 1692 (age 59)

Domenico Maria Marchese, O.P. (1633–1692) was a Roman Catholic prelate who served as Bishop of Pozzuoli (1688–1692).

== Biography ==
Domenico Maria Marchese was born on 2 Mar 1633 in Naples, Italy and ordained a priest in the Order of Preachers.

On 31 May 1688, he was appointed Bishop of Pozzuoli by Pope Innocent XI. On 31 May 1688, he was consecrated bishop by Galeazzo Marescotti, Cardinal-Priest of Santi Quirico e Giulitta, with Pietro de Torres, Archbishop of Dubrovnik, and Pier Antonio Capobianco, Bishop Emeritus of Lacedonia, serving as co-consecrators.

He served as Bishop of Pozzuoli until his death in May 1692.

== External links and additional sources ==
- Cheney, David M. "Diocese of Pozzuoli". Catholic-Hierarchy.org. (for Chronology of Bishops) ^{[self-published]}
- Chow, Gabriel. "Diocese of Pozzuoli (Italy)". GCatholic.org. (for Chronology of Bishops) ^{[self-published]}

Catholic Church titles
Preceded by Diego Ibáñez de la Madrid y Bustamente	Bishop of Pozzuoli; 1688–1692	Succeeded by José Sanz de Villaragut
