= Alonso Fernández de Córdoba y Aguilar =

Spanish cardinal and Grand Inquisitor

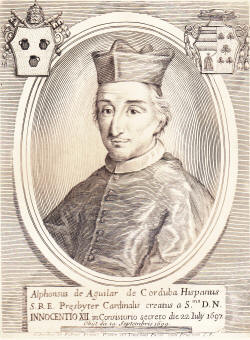
Alonso Fernández de Córdoba y Aguilar.

Alonso Fernández de Córdoba y Aguilar (1653–1699) was a Spanish cardinal who served as Grand Inquisitor of Spain briefly in 1699.

== Biography ==
Alonso Fernández de Córdoba y Aguilar was born in Montilla on 21 September 1653. He was the son of Luis Fernández de Córdoba y Enríquez de Ribera, 5th Duke of Feria, and his wife Mariana Fernández de Córdoba. His older brother Luis Fernández de Córdoba succeeded his father as 6th Duke of Feria. He was educated at the University of Salamanca.

After graduating, he became a canon of the Cathedral of Córdoba. His uncle, Francisco Fernández de Córdoba y Pimentel, 8th Duke of Sessa arranged for him to become abbot of Santa Maria de Rute. Charles II of Spain awarded him the Order of Alcántara in 1676 and appointed him to the Consejo de Órdenes.

In the consistory of July 1697, Pope Innocent XII named him a cardinal, although he ultimately never traveled to Rome to receive the galero. He was appointed Grand Inquisitor of Spain on 5 September 1699 but died before he could assume this office.

He died in Madrid on 19 September 1699.

Catholic Church titles
Preceded by Juan Tomás de Rocaberti	Grand Inquisitor of Spain; 1699	Succeeded by Baltasar de Mendoza y Sandoval
