= Diocese of Ceuta =

Former Roman Catholic diocese in Spain

The Catholic diocese of Ceuta, first Portuguese and afterwards Spanish, existed from 1417 to 1879. It was a suffragan of the Patriarchate of Lisbon until 1675, with the end of the Iberian Union, when Ceuta chose to remain linked to the king of Spain. Since then it was a suffragan of the archdiocese of Seville. Its territory around Ceuta had previously belonged to the Order of Christ.

The diocese of Tanger was united to it, in 1570. In 1851, upon the signature of the concordat between the Holy See and Spain, the diocese of Ceuta was agreed to be suppressed, being combined into the diocese of Cádiz y Ceuta (up to then diocese of Cádiz y Algeciras). The agreement was implemented in 1879.

== Ordinaries ==
=== Diocese of Ceuta ===
Erected: 4 April 1417
Metropolitan: Archdiocese of Seville

- Aymar de Aureliano (21 Mar 1421 – 1443 Died)
- João Manuel (20 Jul 1444 – 9 Jul 1459 Appointed, Bishop of Guarda)
- Juan Roderici (13 Jul 1459 – 27 Sep 1459 Appointed, Bishop of Coimbra)
- Alvaro (17 Oct 1469 – )
- João Manuel Ferraz (9 Jan 1472 – 17 Mar 1477 Appointed, Bishop of Guarda)
- Martin Pedro (28 Mar 1477 – 24 Sep 1477 Appointed, Bishop of Lamego)
- Justo Baldini (15 Mar 1479 – 1493 Died)
- Fernando de Almeida (bishop) (Cotignus) (19 Jul 1493 – 19 Jun 1499 Appointed, Bishop of Nevers)
- Diego de Ortiz de Vilhegas (3 May 1500 – 27 Jun 1505 Appointed, Bishop of Viseu)
- Henrique Alvari de Coimbra (30 Jan 1506 – 14 Sep 1532 Died)
- Diego da Silva (4 Mar 1534 – 24 Sep 1540 Appointed, Archbishop of Braga)
- Diego de Ortiz de Vilhegas (24 Sep 1540 – 4 Jul 1544 Died)
- Jorge de Coimbra (9 Oct 1545 – 12 Mar 1569 Died)
- Francisco Quaresma (9 Jun 1570 – 1585 Died)
- Manoel de Séabra (Leabra) (14 Jan 1577 – 1583 Resigned)
- Diogo Correia (15 Jul 1585 – 16 Feb 1598 Appointed, Bishop of Portalegre)
- Hector Valladares (11 Mar 1598 – 1600 Died)
- Jerónimo de Gouveia (24 Jan 1601 – 1602 Resigned)
- Agostinho Ribeiro (27 Aug 1603 – 29 Jul 1613 Appointed, Bishop of Angra)
- Antonio de Aguilar (21 Oct 1613 – 1632 Died)
- Gonçalvo da Silva (6 Sep 1632 – 16 Feb 1649 Died)
- Antonio Medina Cachón y Ponce de León (16 Dec 1675 – 9 Dec 1680 Appointed, Bishop of Lugo)
- Juan de Porras y Atienza (12 May 1681 – 24 Apr 1684 Appointed, Bishop of Coria)
- Luis de Ayllón (5 Jun 1684 Confirmed – )
- Antonio Ibáñez de la Riva Herrera (9 Apr 1685 Confirmed – 28 Apr 1687 Appointed, Archbishop of Zaragoza)
- Diego Ibáñez de la Madrid y Bustamente (9 Jun 1687 – 5 Apr 1694 Died)
- Vidal Marín Fernández (13 Sep 1694 – 10 Mar 1709 Died)
- Sancho Antonio Belunza Corcuera (11 Dec 1713 Confirmed – 5 Oct 1716 Appointed, Bishop of Coria)
- Francisco Laso de la Vega Córdova (5 Oct 1716 – 28 May 1721 Appointed, Bishop of Plasencia)
- Tomás Crespo Agüero (16 Jul 1721 – 17 Mar 1727 Appointed, Archbishop of Zaragoza)
- Tomás del Valle (17 Mar 1727 – 12 Feb 1731 Appointed, Bishop of Cádiz)
- Andrés Mayoral Alonso de Mella (9 Apr 1731 – 27 Jan 1738 Appointed, Archbishop of Valencia)
- Miguel Aguiar (27 Jan 1738 – 14 Feb 1743 Died)
- Martín Barcia Carrascal (15 Jul 1743 – 12 Jan 1756 Appointed, Bishop of Córdoba)
- José Patricio de la Cuesta Velarde (7 Apr 1756 – 17 Aug 1761 Appointed, Bishop of Sigüenza)
- Antonio Gómez de la Torre y Jaraveitia (17 Aug 1761 – 28 May 1770 Appointed, Bishop of Jaén)
- José Domingo Rivero (6 Aug 1770 – Jan 1771 Died)
- Manuel Fernández Torres (17 Jun 1771 – 6 Sep 1773 Died)
- Felipe Antonio Solano Marín (18 Apr 1774 – 1 Mar 1779 Appointed, Bishop of Cuenca)
- Diego Martín Rodríguez (13 Dec 1779 – 14 Feb 1785 Appointed, Bishop of Coria)
- Bartolomé Antonio Fernández Sobrado (19 Dec 1785 – Dec 1811 Died)
- Andrés Esteban y Gómez (19 Dec 1814 Confirmed – 22 Jul 1816 Appointed, Bishop of Jaén)
- Rafael Téllez (14 Apr 1817 – 12 Jul 1824 Confirmed, Archbishop of Burgos)
- Francisco Javier García Casarrubios y Melgar (27 Sep 1824 Confirmed – 19 Dec 1825 Confirmed, Bishop of Tui)
- Pablo Hernández (13 Mar 1826 Confirmed – 21 Jul 1829 Died)
- Juan Sánchez Barragán y Vera (15 Mar 1830 Confirmed – 14 Aug 1846 Died)

5 September 1851: United with Diocese of Cádiz to form Diocese of Cádiz y Ceuta

== See also ==
- Cathedral of St Mary of the Assumption (Ceuta)
