= Francisco Pérez de Prado y Cuesta =

Spanish bishop and Grand Inquisitor (1677–1755)

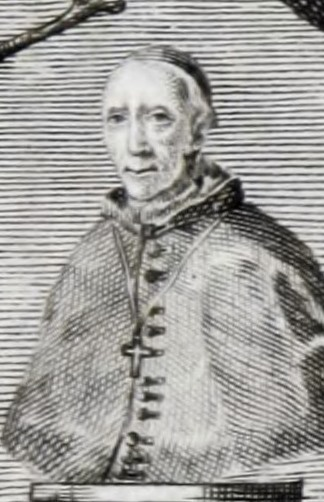
Francisco Perez de Prado. General Inquisitor. In "Portraits of Spaniards" (ca.1831)

Francisco Pérez de Prado y Cuesta (1677–1755) was Bishop of Teruel from 1732 to 1755 and Grand Inquisitor of Spain from 1746 to 1755.

== Biography ==
Francisco Pérez de Prado y Cuesta was born in Aranda de Duero on 8 December 1677. He was appointed Bishop of Teruel on 14 August 1732 and consecrated as a bishop on 7 December 1732. On 26 July 1746 Ferdinand VI of Spain appointed him Grand Inquisitor of Spain (and thus head of the Spanish Inquisition), and he received his commission on 22 August 1746. He died on 9 July 1755.

Catholic Church titles
Preceded by Pedro Felipe Miranda y Ponce de León	Bishop of Teruel; 1732–1755	Succeeded by Francisco Javier Pérez Baroja y Muro
Preceded by Manuel Isidro Orozco Manrique de Lara	Grand Inquisitor of Spain; 1746–1755	Succeeded by Manuel de Quintano y Bonifaz
