= Felipe Beltrán Serrano =

Grand Inquisitor of Spain (1704–1783)

- Bishop of Salamanca
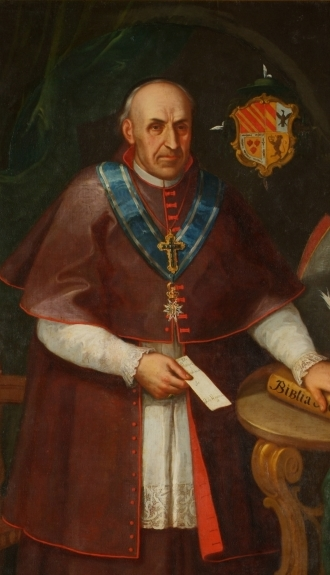
- Church: Catholic Church
- Diocese: Diocese of Salamanca
- In office: 18 July 1763 – 30 November 1783
- Predecessor: José Zorrilla de Sanmartín
- Successor: Andrés José Barco Espinosa

Orders
- Consecration: 25 September 1763 by Andrés Mayoral

Personal details
- Born: 20 October 1704 La Serra d'en Galceran, Kingdom of Valencia, Crown of Aragon
- Died: 30 November 1783 (aged 79) Madrid, Kingdom of Spain

Felipe Beltrán Serrano (1704–1783) was a Spanish churchman who was Bishop of Salamanca from 1763 to 1783 and Grand Inquisitor of Spain from 1775 to 1783.

== Biography ==
Felipe Beltrán Serrano was born in La Serra d'en Galceran on 20 October 1704, the son of poor parents. Through the patronage of Ginés Rabaza Perellós, Marquis of Dos Aquas, he enrolled at the University of Valencia in 1721. In 1724, he began the study of Christian theology at the University of Valencia, receiving a master's degree after three years. He taught Thomistic philosophy from 1728 to 1735. In 1735, he became professor of Thomistic philosophy, holding that chair until it was abolished in 1738.

In 1739, again through the patronage of Ginés Rabaza Perellós, Marquis of Dos Aquas, he was appointed parish priest of Bétera. He became parish priest of Massamagrell in 1752. In 1759, he became a canon of Valencia Cathedral.

He was appointed Bishop of Salamanca on 18 July 1763 and he was consecrated as a bishop on 25 September 1763. He was a supporter of the expulsion of the Jesuits from Spain in 1767.

He was appointed Grand Inquisitor of Spain on 24 December 1774. As Grand Inquisitor, he continued the suppression of Jansenism in Spain. He oversaw the heresy trial of Pablo de Olavide in 1775. He acted as patron of Pedro Estala. José Francisco de Isla wrote satire directed at Beltrán. Beltrán received the Order of Charles III in 1780.

He died in Madrid on 30 November 1783.

== See also ==
- Catholic Church in Spain

Catholic Church titles
Preceded by José Zorrilla Sanmartín	Bishop of Salamanca; 1763–1783	Succeeded by Andrés José Barco Espinosa
Preceded by Manuel de Quintano y Bonifaz	Grand Inquisitor of Spain; 1775–1783	Succeeded by Agustín Rubin de Ceballos
