= Diocese of Albarracín =

Former Roman Catholic diocese in Spain

The Diocese of Albarracín (Latin: Dioecesis Albarracinensis) was a Latin Church diocese of the Catholic Church which existed from 1577 to 1851. It was located in northeastern Spain, in the present-day province of Teruel in the autonomous community of Aragón. In 1851, it was united with the Diocese of Teruel to form the Diocese of Teruel-Albarracín.

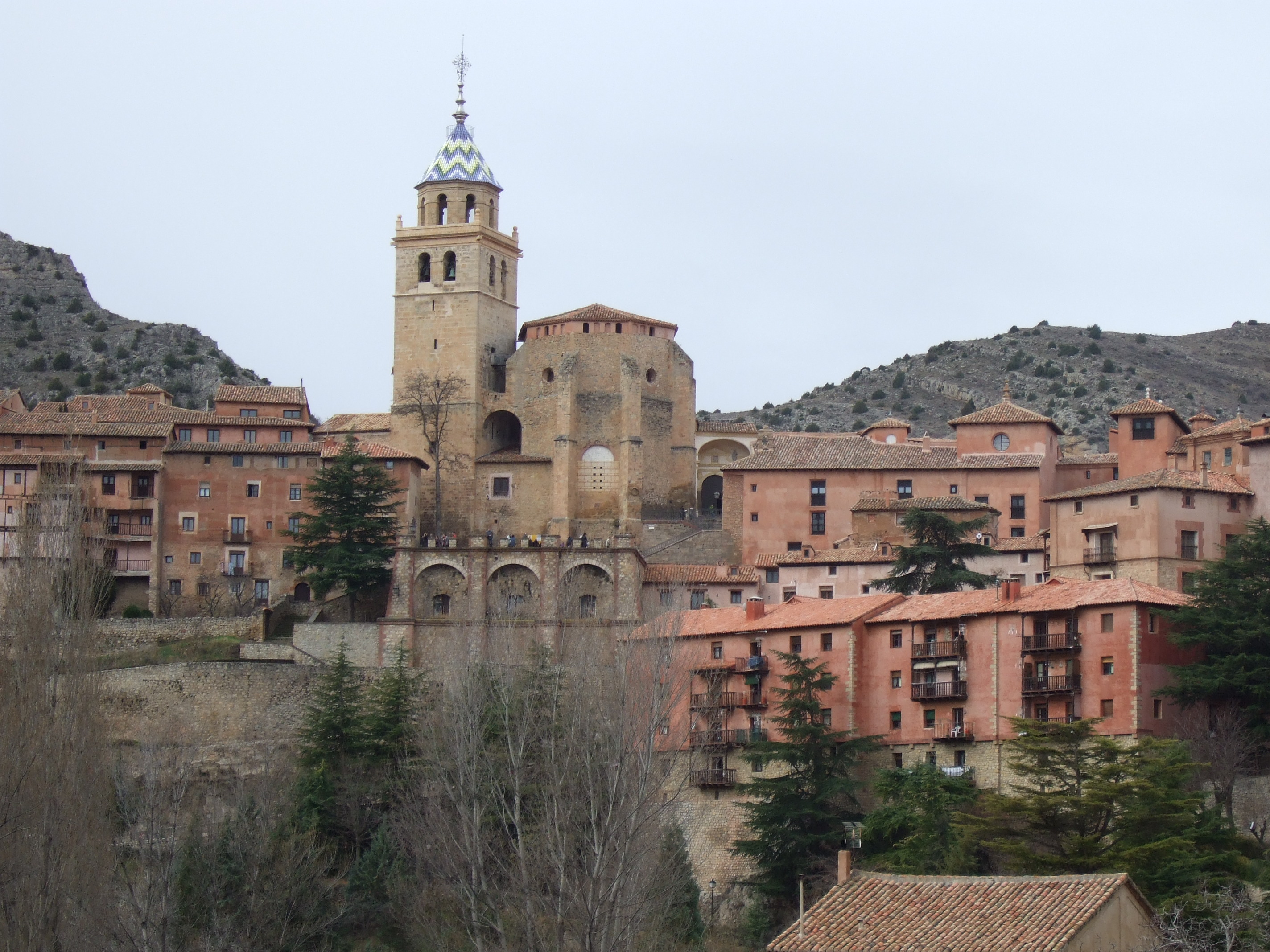
Cathedral of Albarracín

== History ==
=== Diocese of Segorbe (1173 – 1259) ===
In 1172, when Pedro Ruiz de Azagra retook the city of Albarracín during the Reconquista and set up the Lordship of Albarracín, he succeeded in establishing a bishop there (Martín). Martín took the title of Arcabricense, and afterwards that of Segobricense, thinking that Albarracín was nearer to the ancient Segobriga (Segorbe) than to Ercavica or Arcabrica.

Though Albarracín is distant from the town of Segorbe, the choice of name follows the ideology of the Reconquista, according to which the bishops were simply restoring the old Christian entities only temporarily taken over by the Moors. In this way, the city of Albarracín became the seat of the bishops of Segorbe.

=== Diocese of Segorbe-Albarracín (1259 – 1571 or 1576) ===
In 1245, King Jaime I retook Segorbe from the Moors, and purified its church. Jimeno, Bishop of Albarracín, could then take possession of it. The bishops of Valencia opposed this, and Arnau of Peralta, Bishop of Valencia, entered the church of Segorbe by force of arms. The controversy being referred to Rome, the bishops of Segorbe had part of their territory restored to them; but the Schism of the West supervened, and the status quo continued.

=== Diocese of Albarracín (1571 or 1577 – 1852) ===
In 1571 Francisco Soto Salazar being bishop of Segorbe-Albarracín, the Diocese of Albarracín was separated from Segorbe.

== Bishops ==
All names are given in Spanish.

=== Segorbe (1173 – 1259) ===
Bishops of Segorbe with seat in Albarracín.

- 1172–1213: Martín
- 1213–1215: Hispano
- 1216–1222: Juan Gil
- 1223–1234: Domingo
- 1235–1238: Guillermo
- 1245–1246: Jimeno
- 1246–1259: Pedro

=== Segorbe-Albarracín (1260 – 1576) ===
- 1260–1264: Martín Álvarez
- 1265–1272: Pedro Garcés
- 1272–1277: Pedro Jiménez de Segura
- 1284–1288: Miguel Sánchez
- 1288–1301: Aparicio
- 1302–1318: Antonio Muñoz
- 1319–1356: Sancho Dull
- 1356–1362: Elías
- 1362–1369: Juan Martínez de Barcelona
- 1369–1387: Iñigo de Valterra
- 1387–1400: Diego de Heredia
- 1400–1409: Francisco Riquer y Bastero
- 1410–1427: Juan de Tauste
- 1428–1437: Francisco de Aguiló
- 1438–1445: Jaime Gerart
- 1445–1454: Gisberto Pardo de la Casta
- 1455–1459: Luis de Milá y Borja
- 1461–1473: Pedro Baldó
- 1473–1498: Bartolomé Martí
- 1498–1499: Juan Marrades
- 1500–1530: Gilberto Martí
- 1530–1556: Gaspar Jofre de Borja
- 1556–1571: Juan de Muñatones
- 1571–1576: Francisco de Soto Salazar

=== Albarracín (1577 – 1851) ===
- 1577: Juan Trullo
- 1578–1583: Martín de Salvatierra
- 1583–1585: Gaspar Juan de la Figuera
- 1586–1589: Bernardino Gómez Miedes
- 1591–1593: Alfonso Gregorio
- 1593–1596: Martín Terrer Valenzuela
- 1597–1602: Pedro Jaime
- 1603–1604: Andrés Balaguer Salvador
- 1605–1608: Vicente Roca de la Serna
- 1608–1611: Isidro Aliaga
- 1611–1617: Lucas Durán
- 1618–1622: Gabriel Sora Aguerri
- 1622–1624: Jerónimo Bautista Lanuza
- 1625–1633: Pedro Apaloaza Ramírez
- 1633–1635: Juan Cebrián Pedro
- 1635–1644: Vicente Domec
- 1645–1653: Martín de Funes Lafiguera
- 1654–1664: Jerónimo Salas de Esplugas
- 1665–1670: Antonio Agustín Soria
- 1670–1673: Iñigo Roto
- 1673–1682: Pedro Tris Lacal
- 1683–1690: Miguel Jerónimo Fuenbuena
- 1700–1704: Luis Pueyo Abadía
- 1704–1727: Juan Navarro Gilabertí
- 1727–1765: Juan Francisco Navarro Gilabertí
- 1765–1776: José Molina Lario y Navarro
- 1777–1780: Lorenzo Lay y Anzano
- 1782–1790: José Constancio Andino
- 1790–1792: Agustín Benito Torres
- 1792–1800: Manuel María Trujillo Jurado
- 1801–1802: Blas Joaquín Álvarez de Palma
- 1802–1807: Antonio Vila y Campos
- 1808–1815: Joaquín González de Terán
- 1815–1823: Andrés García Palomares
- 1824–1828: Jerónimo Fernández de Castro Delgado
- 1829–1839: José Talayero Royo
- 1839–1851: Capitular vicars (Vicarios capitulares)
- 1851–1984: See Diocese of Teruel-Albarracín.
- 1985–today: See Diocese of Teruel and Albarracín.

== See also ==
- List of Catholic dioceses in Spain

== Sources ==
- Amado, R.R. (1912). "Diocese of Segorbe" . Catholic Encyclopedia. Vol. 13.
