= Manuel Abad y Lasierra =

Spanish bishop, writer and Grand Inquisitor

Manuel Abad y Lasierra (1729–1806) was a Spanish bishop and writer who was Grand Inquisitor of Spain from 1793 to 1794.

== Biography ==
Manuel Abad y Lasierra was born in Estadilla on December 24, 1729. His father, Francisco Abad Navarro, was from Estadilla, and his mother, María Teresa Lasierra, was from Barbuñales. He was educated at the University of Huesca, after which he was ordained as a priest. Shortly thereafter, he became a Benedictine monk at the Monastery of San Juan de la Peña. There, he studied History and Antiquities. He endeared himself to Charles III of Spain by discovering ancient rights of the crown that had been forgotten. He became a member of the Real Academia de la Historia in 1773. He later became the prior of the monastery located in Vilanova de Meià. He traveled to court in Madrid in 1782, seeking patronage to get his academic works published.

On July 18, 1783, he was appointed the first ever Bishop of Ibiza, and he was consecrated as a bishop by Francisco Antonio de Lorenzana on August 17, 1783. He was translated to the See of Astorga on September 28, 1787. He was called to Madrid in 1789 to become preceptor of the children of Charles IV of Spain, although this appointment never ultimately occurred. He resigned as Bishop of Astorga on April 9, 1791. He became Titular Archbishop of Selymbria on April 11, 1792. He became Grand Inquisitor of Spain (and thus head of the Spanish Inquisition) in April 1793, but was forced to resign the next year, probably because he attempted to institute reforms to make the Spanish Inquisition less secretive. He became head of the monastery at Sopetrán, Guadalajara in 1794.

He retired to his native Estadilla in 1798. He died in Zaragoza on January 12, 1806, following an accident. He was buried in the Basilica of Our Lady of the Pillar on January 14, 1806.

Catholic Church titles
Preceded by Agustín Rubin de Ceballos	Grand Inquisitor of Spain; 1793–1794	Succeeded by Francisco Antonio de Lorenzana
