= Pedro Estala =

Spanish hellenist (1757-1815)

Pedro Estala (1757–1815) was a Spanish hellenist, philologist, writer, translator, literary critic, and literary editor.

== Biography ==
His family was originally from Valencia, his mother was born in Alicante and married Hipólito Casiano Antonio Estala on 10 February 1754. The paternal grandfather, Joseph Estala Valero, was also Valencian and married La Mancha Maria Josefa Lozano Ruiz de Valdelomar, who was born in Daimiel and was of noble origin; hence Estala often replaced his second surname to Valdelomar. The couple had nine children, of which Pedro was the third.

Estala was probably educated in a school of Escolapios of Madrid. In 1778 he entered as a professor at the College of San Fernando neighborhood of Lavapiés, where he taught humanities until 1788, when he was appointed professor of rhetoric and Greek in the Council Seminary of San Carlos in Salamanca, during the golden age of Order of the Pious Schools, restored by Bishop Felipe Scio de San Miguel so that the study of classical languages be promoted to replace the expelled Jesuit order in this field. Contrary to the assertions of Marcelino Menéndez Pelayo, claiming there is no evidence that Estala studied philosophy and theology at Salamanca. But it is certain that he often traveled to Salamanca from 1776, to visit his patron Felipe Beltrán Serrano, bishop of Salamanca since 1763 and Inquisitor General since 1774. It was this patron who created the Seminary of San Carlos de Salamanca where Estala became a professor of rhetoric and Greek in 1788. On 21 September 1781, he was ordained a priest.

In 1805, he was appointed a canon of the Cathedral of Toledo, and —months before the Disaster at Trafalgar— he published, with great success, Cartas de un español a un anglómano ("Letters from a Spaniard to an Anglophile"). This work of political propaganda cataloged the various evils and outrages that the English government had perpetrated against France, Spain, and Spain’s overseas territories.
Estala became increasingly interested in political matters. Consequently, when French troops invaded the country in 1808, he enthusiastically supported the reformist measures of King Joseph Bonaparte. He published "El Imparcial" in 1809, a periodical dedicated to reflection and political propaganda, was awarded the Royal Order of Spain, and was appointed director of the government’s official printing office. Between 1810 and 1811, he served on a commission for theaters and on a Board of Public Instruction tasked with educational reforms.

When the pro-Joseph government began its retreat following the Defeat at Arapiles (July 1812), Estala and Moratín, along with other officials, traveled with the French convoy to Valencia. There, they worked on the "Diario de Valencia"* until 30 June 1813. Forced to leave that city, they reached Peñíscola, where they endured a siege while taking refuge in the castle, suffering through nearly a year of hardship. As King Ferdinand failed to honor his own Amnesty Decree (30 May 1814), the group fled further to Barcelona. From there, the playwright wrote to Juan Antonio Melón:

"Damón has left for France by sea an old man, suffering from dropsy and an ulcer on his leg, possessing an insufferable temperament and a volatile temper, no doubt exacerbated by the many hardships he has endured..." 

Estala was housed in the city of Auch, where he died on 29 April 1815, at the age of fifty-seven.

== Work ==
- Solemn funeral held in the holy church of Salamanca and Real Seminario de San Carlos in the translation of the body of Sir Don Felipe Bertran, Bishop of Salamanca, Inquisitor General, bishop knight Grand Crus of the Royal and Distinguished Spanish Order of Carlos III, 1790.
- Journey to Parnassus, published by Maria Elena Cruz Arenas Journal of the Enlightenment and Romanticism, No. 10 (2002).
- The universal traveler or news of old and new world, collected works of the best travelers, translated into Castilian and corrected the original and illustrated with notes by Don Pedro Estala, Madrid, 1795-1801, 43 vols.
- "Discourse on the tragedy" in his translation of Sophocles, Oedipus Tyrannus, 1793.
- "Discourse on the comedy" in his translation of Aristophanes, The Pluto, 1794.
- Preface to Poems by Francisco de Figueroa, called the Divine, 1785.
- Preface to Rimas doctor Bartholomew Leonardo de Argensola, 1786.
- Preface to Rhymes Fernando de Herrera, 1786.
- Preface to Rimas Don Juan de Jauregui, 1786.
- Preface to Rimas Lupercio secretary Leonardo de Argensola, 1786.
- Preface to Poems of Don Luis de Gongora y Argote, 1789.
- Preface to Lope de Vega, Human and divine the lawyer took Burguillos Rhymes, 1792.
- "Prologue" to works Christobal de Castillejo, secretary of Emperor Ferdinand, 1792.
- "Shadow Celenio Inarco Nelson, PA, translated fool to those who know another language this" in Minerva or the Auditor General No.. XXV, 24 December 1805, pp. 217–220.
- El Imparcial or Political Gazette - Literary, Madrid, from March to August 1809.
- Moral tales of Marmontel, translated by Don Pedro Estala, Valencia, Salva, 1813.
- Bello-critical satirical registration for intelligence like the Spanish spelling, Madrid, 1785 (signed with the pseudonym of Claudio Bachelor Rosillo)
- The five books on the opinions of philosophers, Plutarch translated from Greek and illustrated, Madrid, 1793, handwritten translation.
- Letters from a Spanish to a Anglomaniac, Madrid, 1795, reprinted in London 1804, Cadiz and Madrid 1805, 1815; no later reprints.
- Compendium of Natural History of Buffon, translated and illustrated by Don Pedro Estala, priest, Imp. de Villalpando, 1802-1811
- "Letters to Forner" published in the Bulletin of the Academy of History, vol. LVIII, 1814.
