= Vidal Marín Fernández =

Spanish bishop

Most Reverend Vidal Marín Fernández
- Bishop of Ceuta
- Church: Catholic Church
- Diocese: Diocese of Ceuta
- In office: 1694–1709
- Predecessor: Diego Ibáñez de la Madrid y Bustamente
- Successor: Sancho Antonio Belunza Corcuera

Orders
- Consecration: 19 December 1694 by Jaime de Palafox y Cardona

Personal details
- Born: 22 February 1653 Mora, Spain
- Died: 10 March 1709 (aged 56)
- Buried: Madrid, later Ceuta

Vidal Marín Fernández (22 February 1653 – 10 March 1709) was a Spanish bishop who was Bishop of Ceuta from 1694, and later Grand Inquisitor of Spain in 1705, until his death in 1709.

== Biography ==
Vidal Marín del Campo was born in Mora, Spain on 22 February 1653. He served as master of Santo Domingo de la Calzada and then as Inquisitor of Salamanca. On 13 September 1694, he was named the Bishop of Ceuta during the papacy of Pope Innocent XII. He was consecrated as bishop by Jaime de Palafox y Cardona on 19 December 1694. In 1705, Philip V of Spain named him Grand Inquisitor of Spain, the head of the Spanish Inquisition. He died on 10 March 1709, and was initially buried in Madrid. His remains were transferred to Ceuta in 1714.

Catholic Church titles
Preceded by Baltasar de Mendoza y Sandoval	Grand Inquisitor of Spain; 1705—1709	Succeeded by Antonio Ibáñez de Riva Herrera
Preceded by Diego Ibáñez de la Madrid y Bustamente	Bishop of Ceuta; 1694–1709	Succeeded by Sancho Antonio Belunza Corcuera
