= Bechis =

Bechis is an Italian surname. Notable people with the surname include:

- Eleonora Bechis (born 1974), Italian politician
- Marco Bechis (born 1955), Chilean-Italian film screenwriter, and director
- Marta Bechis (born 1989), Italian volleyball player

== See also ==
- Bechi
