= Diego Ibáñez de la Madrid y Bustamente =

17th-century Roman Catholic bishop

Most Reverend Diego Ibáñez de la Madrid y Bustamente
- Bishop of Ceuta
- Church: Catholic Church
- Diocese: Diocese of Ceuta
- In office: 1687–1694
- Predecessor: Antonio Ibáñez de la Riva Herrera
- Successor: Vidal Marín Fernández
- Previous posts: Bishop of Trivento (1679–1684); Bishop of Pozzuoli (1684–1687)

Orders
- Ordination: 17 Feb 1674
- Consecration: 16 Apr 1679 by Carlo Pio di Savoia

Personal details
- Born: 7 Apr 1649 Comillas, Spain
- Died: 5 Apr 1694 (age 44)

Diego Ibáñez de la Madrid y Bustamente (1649–1694) was a Roman Catholic prelate who served as Bishop of Ceuta (1687–1694), Bishop of Pozzuoli (1684–1687), and Bishop of Trivento (1679–1684).

== Biography ==
Diego Ibáñez de la Madrid y Bustamente was born on 7 Apr 1649 in Comillas, Spain and ordained a priest on 17 Feb 1674. On 24 Oct 1678, he was selected as Bishop of Trivento and confirmed by Pope Innocent XI on 10 Apr 1679. On 16 Apr 1679, he was consecrated bishop by Carlo Pio di Savoia, Cardinal-Priest of San Crisogono, with Francesco Casati, Titular Archbishop of Trapezus, and Gregorio Carducci, Bishop of Valva e Sulmona, serving as co-consecrators. On 2 Oct 1684, he was appointed during the papacy of Pope Innocent XI as Bishop of Pozzuoli. On 9 Jun 1687, he was appointed during the papacy of Pope Innocent XI as Bishop of Ceuta. He served as Bishop of Ceuta until his death on 5 Apr 1694.

== External links and additional sources ==
- Cheney, David M. "Diocese of Trivento". Catholic-Hierarchy.org. (for Chronology of Bishops) ^{[self-published]}
- Chow, Gabriel. "Diocese of Trivento (Italy)". GCatholic.org. (for Chronology of Bishops) ^{[self-published]}
- Cheney, David M. "Diocese of Pozzuoli". Catholic-Hierarchy.org. (for Chronology of Bishops) ^{[self-published]}
- Chow, Gabriel. "Diocese of Pozzuoli (Italy)". GCatholic.org. (for Chronology of Bishops) ^{[self-published]}
- Cheney, David M. "Diocese of Ceuta". Catholic-Hierarchy.org. (for Chronology of Bishops) ^{[self-published]}
- Chow, Gabriel. "Diocese of Ceuta (Spain)". GCatholic.org. (for Chronology of Bishops) ^{[self-published]}

Catholic Church titles
Preceded by Ambrogio Maria Piccolomini	Bishop of Trivento; 1679–1684	Succeeded by Antonio Tortorelli
Preceded by Carlo della Palma	Bishop of Pozzuoli; 1684–1687	Succeeded by Domenico Maria Marchese
Preceded by Antonio Ibáñez de la Riva Herrera	Bishop of Ceuta; 1687–1694	Succeeded by Vidal Marín Fernández
