= Grand Inquisitor =

Lead official of the Inquisition

- Inquisitor Generalis
- Appointer: Monarch
- Inaugural holder: Tomás de Torquemada
- Formation: 1483
- Final holder: Jerónimo Castillón y Salas
- Abolished: 1820

Grand Inquisitor (Latin: Inquisitor Generalis, literally Inquisitor General or General Inquisitor) was the highest-ranked official of the Inquisition. The title usually refers to the inquisitor of the Spanish Inquisition, in charge of appeals and cases of aristocratic importance, even after the reunification of the inquisitions. Secretaries-general of the Roman Inquisition were often styled as Grand Inquisitor but the role and functions were different.

The Portuguese Inquisition was headed by a Grand Inquisitor, or General Inquisitor, named by the Pope but selected by the king, always from within the royal family.

The most famous Inquisitor General was the Spanish Dominican Tomás de Torquemada, who spearheaded the Spanish Inquisition.

== List of Spanish Grand Inquisitors ==
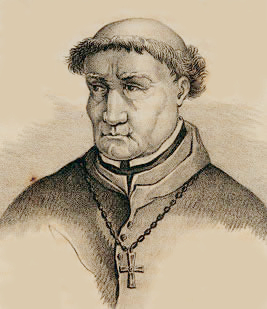
Tomás de Torquemada, Grand Inquisitor of Spain (1483–1498)

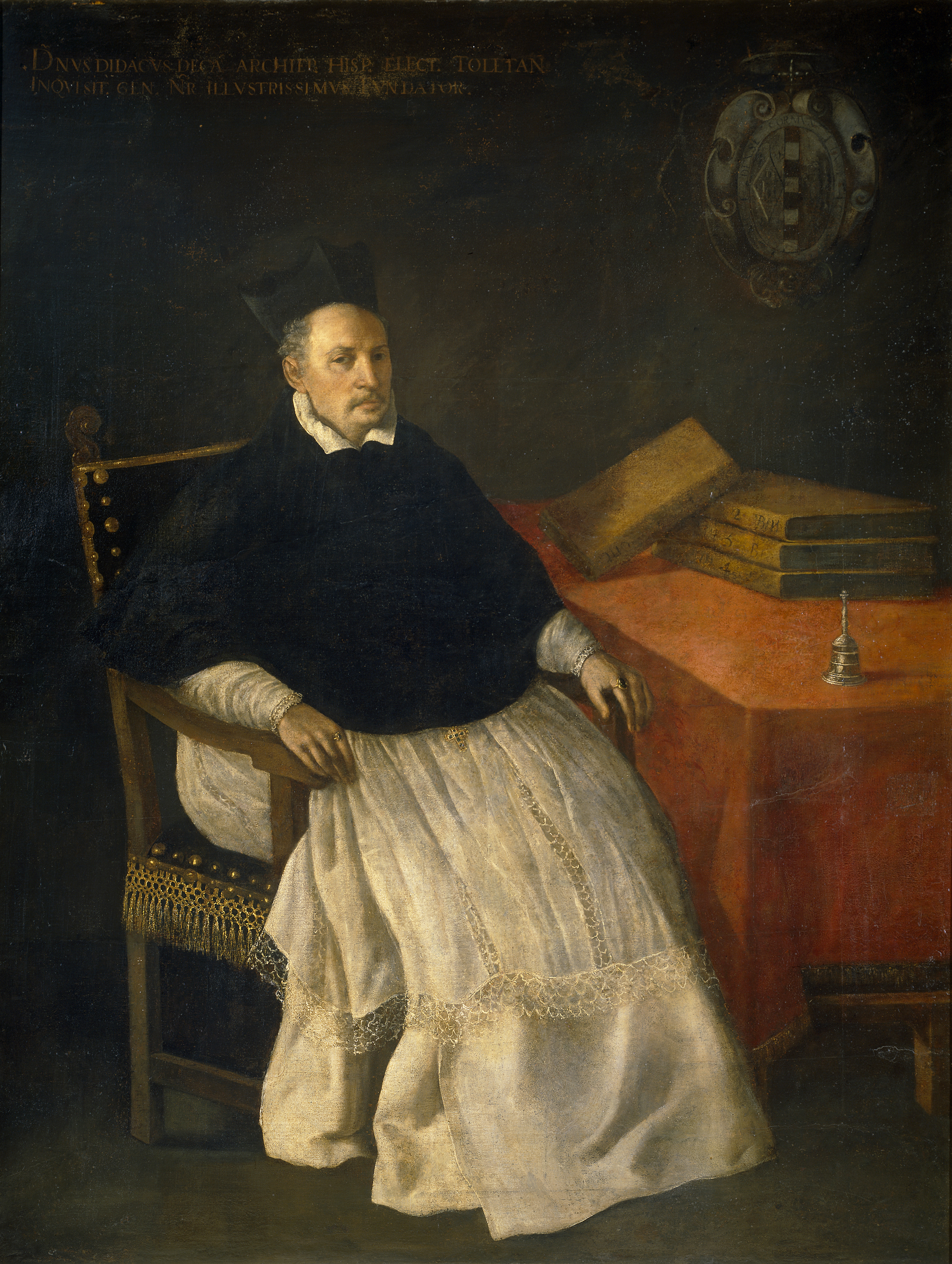
Diego de Deza, Grand Inquisitor of Spain (1498–1507)

From	To	Grand Inquisitor	Other positions held
1483	1498	Tomás de Torquemada	Prior of the Dominican Convent of Santa Cruz, Segovia, 1477–1498
1499	1506	Diego de Deza Tavera	Archbishop of Seville
1506	1507	Diego Ramírez de Guzmán	Bishop of Catania, Bishop of Lugo

=== Separation of Inquisitions of Castile and Aragon ===
==== Castile ====
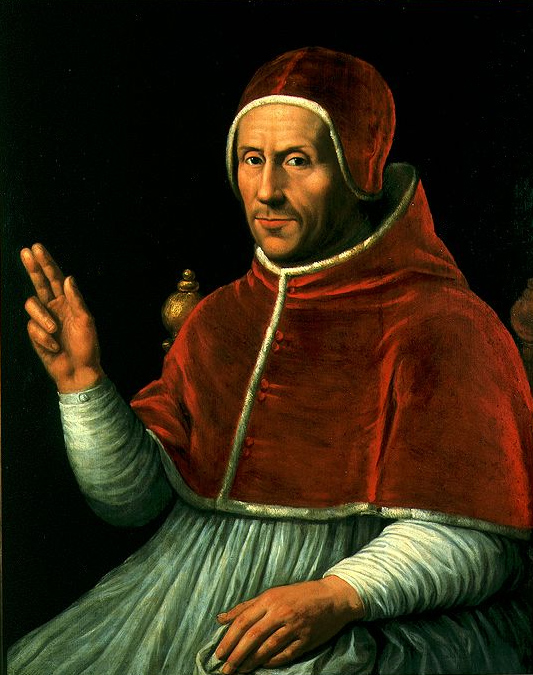
Adrian of Utrecht, Grand Inquisitor of Spain (1518–1522)

From	To	Grand Inquisitor	Other positions held
1507	1517	Francisco Jiménez de Cisneros	Cardinal, Archbishop of Toledo

==== Aragon ====
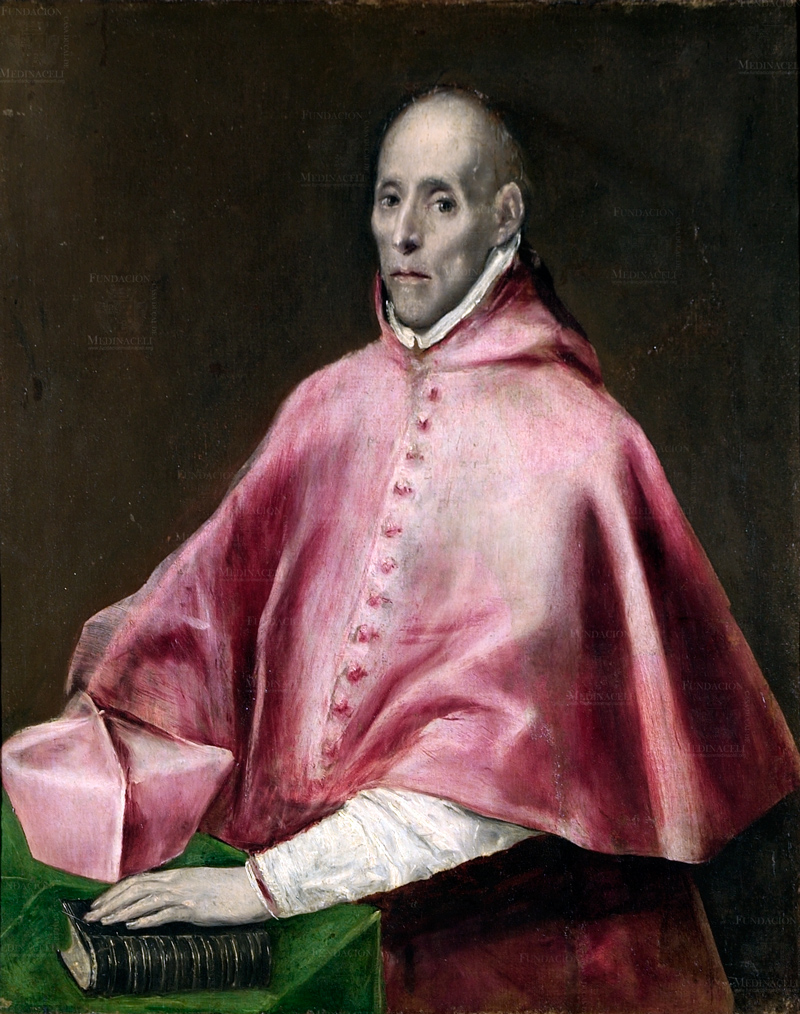
Juan Pardo de Tavera, Grand Inquisitor of Spain (1539–1545)

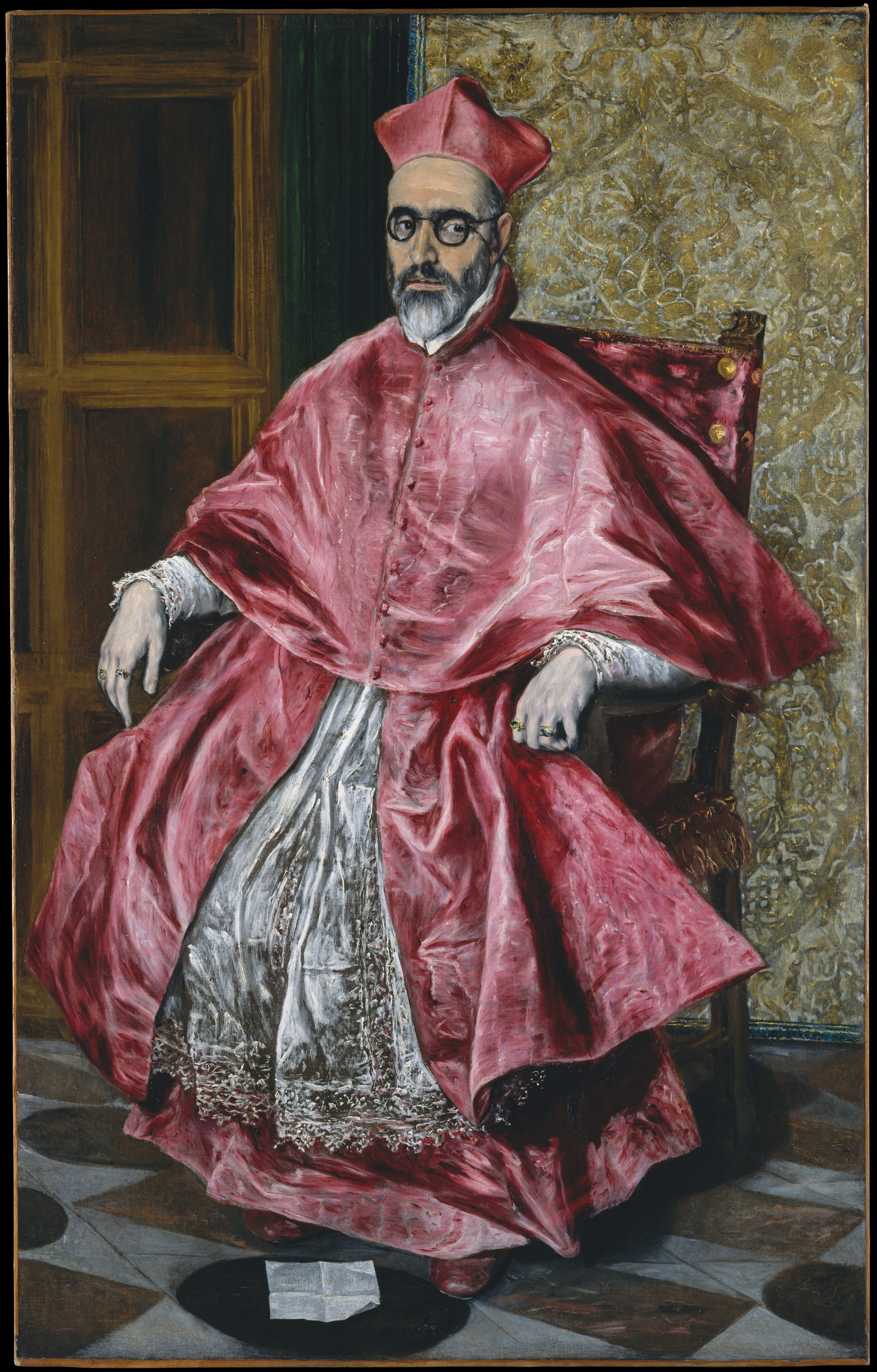
Fernando Niño de Guevara, Grand Inquisitor of Spain (1600–1602)

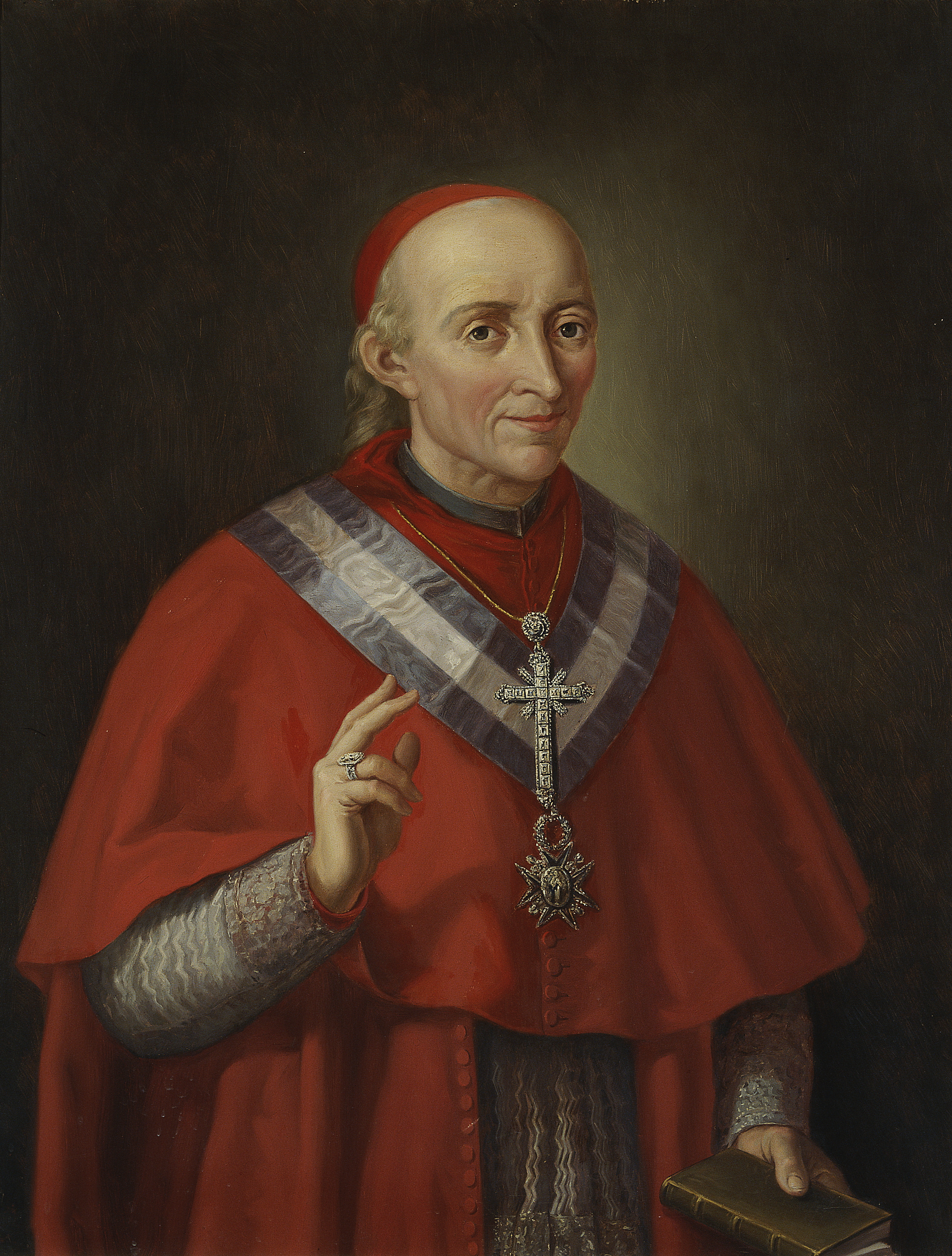
Francisco Antonio de Lorenzana, Grand Inquisitor of Spain (1794–1797)

From	To	Grand Inquisitor	Other positions held
1507	1513	Juan Enguera	Bishop of Vich, Bishop of Lleida, Bishop of Tortosa
1513	1516	Luis Mercader Escolano	Bishop of Tortosa
1516	1517	Adrian of Utrecht	Cardinal priest of Ss. Giovanni e Paolo, Bishop of Tortosa, later Pope

=== Reunification of the Inquisitions ===
From	To	Grand Inquisitor	Other positions held
1518	1522	Adrian of Utrecht	Cardinal priest of Ss. Giovanni e Paolo, Bishop of Tortosa, later Pope
1523	1538	Alonso Manrique de Lara	Bishop of Badajoz, Archbishop of Seville, Cardinal
1539	1545	Juan Pardo de Tavera	Archbishop of Toledo
1546	1546	García de Loaysa	Archbishop of Seville
1547	1566	Fernando de Valdés y Salas	Archbishop of Seville
1566	1572	Diego de Espinosa	Bishop of Sigüenza, Bishop of Cuenca
1572	1572	Pedro Ponce de León	Bishop of Ciudad Rodrigo, Bishop of Plasencia
1573	1594	Gaspar de Quiroga y Vela	Archbishop of Toledo
1595	1595	Jerónimo Manrique de Lara	Bishop of Cartagena, Bishop of Ávila
1596	1599	Pedro de Portocarrero	Bishop of Calahorra, Bishop of Cuenca
1599	1602	Fernando Niño de Guevara	Archbishop of Seville
1602	1602	Juan de Zúñiga Flores	Bishop of Cartagena
1603	1608	Juan Bautista de Acevedo	Bishop of Valladolid, Patriarch of the West Indies
1608	1618	Bernardo de Sandoval y Rojas	Archbishop of Toledo
1619	1621	Luis de Aliaga Martínez	
1622	1626	Andrés Pacheco	Bishop of Cuenca, Patriarch of the West Indies
1627	1632	Antonio de Zapata Cisneros	Archbishop of Burgos
1632	1643	Antonio de Sotomayor	Prior of Santo Domingo
1643	1665	Diego de Arce y Reinoso	Bishop of Tuy, Bishop of Avila, Bishop of Palencia
1665	1665	Pascual de Aragón	Archbishop of Toledo
1666	1669	Juan Everardo Nithard	
1669	1695	Diego Sarmiento de Valladares	Bishop of Oviedo, Bishop of Plasencia
1695	1699	Juan Tomás de Rocaberti	Prior of Santo Domingo, Archbishop of Valencia
1699	1699	Alonso Fernández de Córdoba y Aguilar	Appointed Grand Inquisitor, but died before he could assume this office.
1699	1705	Baltasar de Mendoza y Sandoval	Bishop of Segovia
1705	1709	Vidal Marín del Campo	Archbishop of Burgos
1709	1710	Antonio Ibáñez de Riva Herrera	Archbishop of Zaragoza, Archbishop of Toledo
1711	1716	Francesco del Giudice	Archbishop of Monreale
1715	1715	Felipe Antonio Gil de Taboada	Commissioned as Grand Inquisitor but did not serve.
1717	1717	José de Molines	Proclaimed in Rome, but detained by Austrians and died without serving.
1718	1718	Felipe de Arcemendi	Died without serving.
1720	1720	Diego de Astorga y Céspedes	Archbishop of Toledo
1720	1733	Juan de Camargo y Angulo	Bishop of Pamplona
1733	1740	Andrés de Orbe y Larreategui	Archbishop of Valencia
1742	1746	Manuel Isidro Orozco Manrique de Lara	Archbishop of Santiago
1746	1755	Francisco Pérez de Prado	Bishop of Teruel
1755	1774	Manuel Quintano Bonifaz	Titular Archbishop of Farsala
1775	1783	Felipe Beltrán Serrano	Bishop of Salamanca
1784	1793	Agustín Rubin de Ceballos	Bishop of Jaén
1793	1794	Manuel Abad y Lasierra	Titular Archbishop of Selymbria
1794	1797	Francisco Antonio Lorenzana y Butrón	Archbishop of Toledo
1797	1808	Ramón José de Arce y Rebollar	Archbishop of Burgos
1808	1814	Abolition of the Inquisition	
1814	1818	Francisco Javier Mier Campillo	Bishop of Almería
1818	1818	Cristóbal Bencomo y Rodríguez	Titular Archbishop of Heraclea (position rejected by himself)
1818	1820	Gerónimo Castillón y Salas	Bishop of Tarazona

== List of inquisitors-general of Portugal ==
- D. Diogo da Silva (1536–1539), Archbishop of Braga.
- Cardinal Dom Henrique (1539–1579), Archbishop of Braga, became King of Portugal.
- D. Manuel de Meneses (1578–1578), Bishop of Lamego and Bishop of Coimbra, killed at the Battle of Alcácer Quibir.
- D. Jorge de Almeida (1580–1585), Archbishop of Lisbon.
- Albert VII, Archduke of Austria (1586–1593), Cardinal and Archbishop of Toledo, Viceroy of Portugal.
- D. António de Matos de Noronha (1596–1602), Bishop of Elvas.
- D. Jorge de Ataíde (1602), Bishop of Viseu, refused the position.
- D. Alexandre de Bragança, (1602–1604), Archbishop of Evora.
- D. Pedro de Castilho (1605–1615), Grand Chaplain of King Philip II of Portugal.
- D. Fernando Martins Mascarenhas (1615–1628), Bishop of Algarve and Bishop of Faro.
- D. Francisco de Castro, (1630–1653), Bishop of Guarda.
- D. Sebastião César de Meneses (1663–1668). Appointed by King Afonso VI of Portugal, but not confirmed by Pope Alexander VII due to the lack of recognition of the new Portuguese State by the Holy See.
- D. Pedro de Lencastre (1671–1673), Archbishop of Braga and Duke of Aveiro.
- D. Veríssimo de Lencastre (1676–1692), Archbishop of Braga.
- D. Frei José de Lencastre (1693–1705), Bishop of Bragança-Miranda and Bishop of Leiria.
- D. Nuno da Cunha e Ataíde (1707–1750), Grand Chaplain of King Pedro II of Portugal and John V of Portugal.
- D. José de Bragança (1758–1760), bastard son of John V of Portugal.
- D. João Cosme da Cunha (1770–1783), Archbishop of Evora and minister of Justice.
- Frei Inácio de São Caetano (1787–1788), confessor of Queen Maria I of Portugal.
- D. José Maria de Melo (1790–1818), Bishop of Algarve, Bishop of Faro and confessor of Queen Maria I of Portugal.
- D. José Joaquim da Cunha Azeredo Coutinho (1818–1821), Bishop of Elvas.
