= Alaejos =

Coordinates: 41°19′N 5°13′W

Alaejos, Spain
- Flag Coat of arms

- Country: Spain
- Autonomous community: Castile and León
- Province: Valladolid
- Municipality: Alaejos

Government
  - Major: Carlos Mangas Nieto

Area
  - Total: 102 km^{2} (39 sq mi)
- Elevation: 754 m (2,474 ft)

Population (2025-01-01)
  - Total: 1,427
  - Density: 14.0/km^{2} (36.2/sq mi)
- Time zone: UTC+1 (CET)
  - Summer (DST): UTC+2 (CEST)

Alaejos is a municipality located in the province of Valladolid, Castile and León, Spain. According to the 2011 census (INE), the municipality has a population of 1,467 inhabitants.

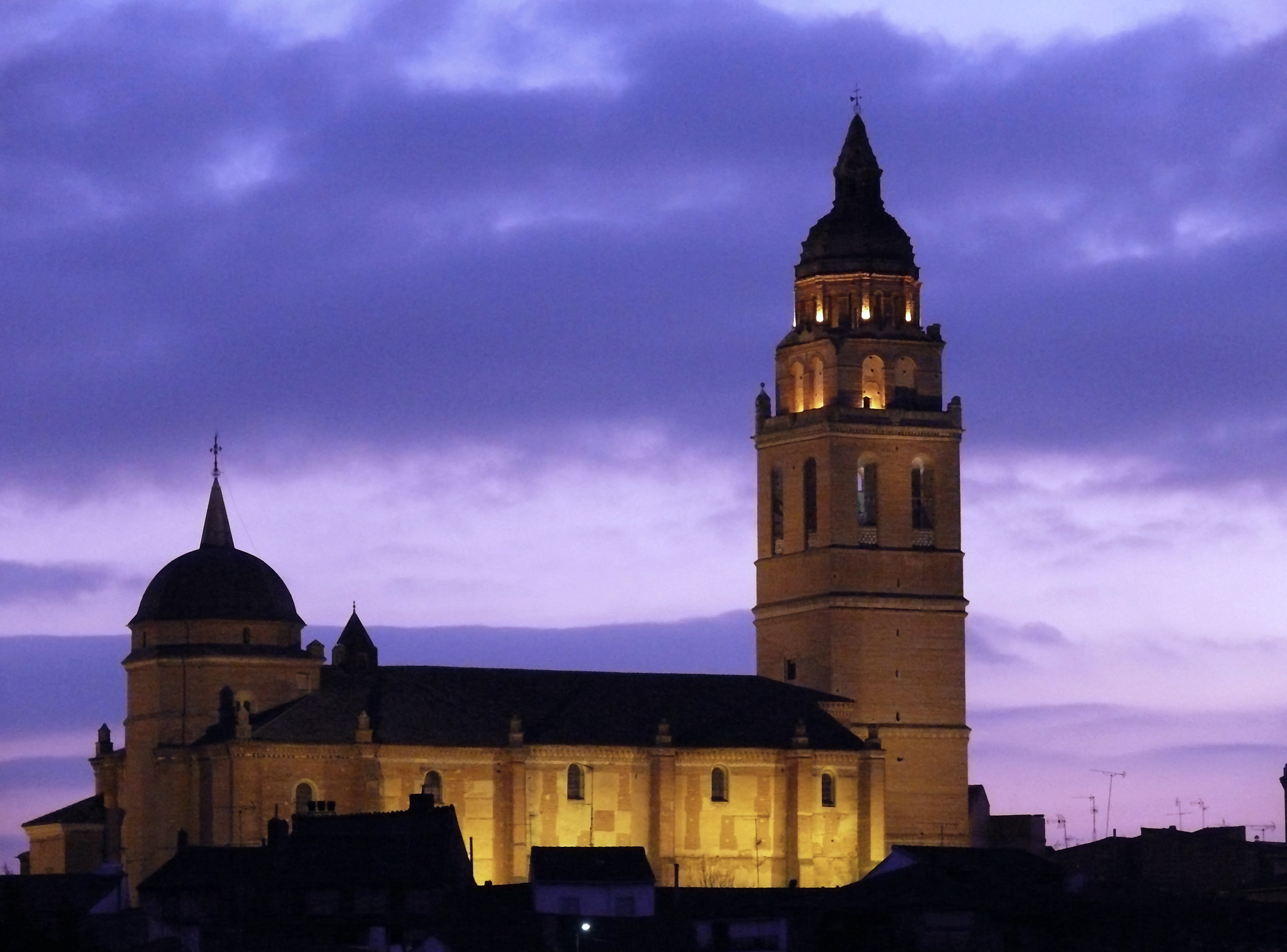
Alaejos

== History ==
Even though the origins of the town remain uncertain, it is known that it was part of the old province of Toro. Its name around the 12th and 13th century was Falafeios. One theory says that it might have been founded by the Castilian monarchs as a hamlet in the reconquered territories during the Reconquista.

By the mid-14th century, the village had been sold to Medina del Campo by Diego Fernández de Medina. It was a jurisdictional dominion by the Bishop of Ávila, Alfonso de Fonseca, until the 19th century.

During the 15th century, Doña Juana de Portugal (Enrique IV's wife) was imprisoned in the castle of Alaejos. In 1520, the comuneros destroyed a large part of the town. In 1595 it joined Valladolid's Bishopric, even though it kept being part of the Province of Segovia.

By year 1785, the Royal Economical Society of Charity (Real Sociedad Caritativo Económica) was founded in the town as a part of the spirit of the Age of Enlightenment, which promoted several very advanced economic, social and educational activities for the childhood and the youth of the town.

The town was declared Conjunto Histórico-Artístico (the equivalent to Heritage Preservation) in 1980.

== Trivia ==
Alaejos is the antipode of Wellington, the capital of New Zealand.

== See also ==
- Cuisine of the province of Valladolid
