= Bechi =

Bechi is an Italian surname. Notable people with the surname include:

- Gino Bechi (1913–1993), Italian operatic baritone
- Luigi Bechi (1830–1919), Italian painter
- Luca Bechi (born 1970), Italian basketball coach

== See also ==
- Bechis
