= José de Solís y Valderrábano =

Spanish nobleman and statesman

José de Solís y Valderrábano (Salamanca, 15 April 1643 - 1 November 1713) was a Spanish nobleman and statesman who held various important positions during the reigns of Charles II and Philip V.

== Biography ==
He was the son of Alonso de Solís y Valderrábano, Count of Villanueva de Cañedo, and Antonia de Solís y Luzón, Lady of Peralejos. He inherited from his father the Adelantado Mayor of Yucatán, which was obtained by the family's ancestor Francisco de Montejo, conqueror of that province in 1546.

During the reign of Charles II he was named Count of Montellano, occupying the positions of Assistant (Mayor) of Seville (1687–91), president of the Casa de Contratación, president of the Council of the Indies (1695) and Viceroy of Sardinia (1696-99).

After the death of the King Charles II, he supported his French successor Philip V, serving as governor of the household of Queen Maria Luisa Gabriella of Savoy. He became a member of the Council of State, President of the Council of the Military Orders (1702–03) and President of the Council of Castile (1703–05).
In 1702 he was admitted as a Knight in the Order of Santiago.
In 1705 his noble title of Count of Montellano was elevated to Duke of Montellano and he became also Grandee of Spain.
