= Manuel Quintano Bonifaz =

Spanish cleric

Manuel Quintano Bonifaz (c. 1699 – 18 December 1774) was a Spanish cleric who was Grand Inquisitor of Spain from 1755 to 1774.

== Biography ==
Manuel Quintano Bonifaz was born in Salas de los Infantes in around 1699. He was appointed Auxiliary Bishop of Toledo on 20 January 1749, becoming Titular Bishop of Farsala at the same time. He was consecrated as a bishop by Cardinal Enrico Enríquez on 16 March 1749. He became Grand Inquisitor of Spain in 1755 and would hold this post until 1774. He also became Apostolic Administrator of Toledo at this time. He was also Director of the Biblioteca Nacional de España from 1755 to 1761. He died on 18 December 1774.

Catholic Church titles
Preceded by Francisco Pérez de Prado y Cuesta	Grand Inquisitor of Spain; 1755–1774	Succeeded by Felipe Beltrán Serrano
