= Duke of Montellano =

Dukedom of Spain

Dukedom of Montellano
- Creation date: 4 February 1705
- Created by: Philip V
- Peerage: Peerage of Spain
- First holder: José de Solís y Valderrábano, 1st Duke of Montellano
- Present holder: Carla Pía Falcó y Medina, 10th Duchess of Montellano

Duke of Montellano (Spanish: Duque de Montellano) is a hereditary title in the Peerage of Spain, accompanied by the dignity of Grandee and granted in 1705 by Philip V to José de Solís, Count of Montellano, Adelantado of Yucatán and descendant of Francisco de Montejo. It makes reference to the town of Montellano in Seville.

The present holder of the title is since 5 May 1979 Carla Falcó y Medina (b. 1957). She married Jaime Matossian y Osorio (b. 1955) in 1981, with whom she has two sons and two daughters, of whom the sons succeeded her in the following titles:

- Don Felipe Matossian y Falcó, since 25 January 2011: 12th Marquess of Pons b. (1982)
- Don Santiago Matessian y Falcó, since 14 March 2013: 5th Count of Santa Isabel, GE (b. 1984)

== Dukes of Montellano (1705) ==
- José de Solís y Valderrábano, 1st Duke of Montellano, (1705-1713)
- Alfonso de Solís y Osorio, 2nd Duke of Montellano, (1714-1717)
- José Ignacio de Solís y Gand-Vilain, 3rd Duke of Montellano, (1717-1765)
- Alonso Vicente de Solís y Folch de Cardona, 4th Duke of Montellan, (1765-1780)
- Álvaro de Solis y Wignacourt, 5th Duke of Montellano, (1780-1806)
- María Vicenta de Solís y Lasso de la Vega, 6th Duchess of Montellano, (1806-1840)
- María del Pilar Ossorio y Gutiérrez de los Ríos, 7th Duchess of Montellano, (1848-1921)
- Felipe Falcó y Ossorio, 8th Duke of Montellano, (1922-1931)
- Manuel Falcó y Escandón, 9th Duke of Montellano, (1934-1975)
- Carla Pía Falcó y Medina, 10th Duchess of Montellano, (1979-)

== See also ==
- List of dukes in the peerage of Spain
- List of current grandees of Spain
