= Baltasar de Mendoza y Sandoval =

Spanish bishop who headed the Spanish Inquisition

Baltasar de Mendoza y Sandoval (1653–1727) was a Spanish bishop who headed the Spanish Inquisition from 1699 to 1704.

== Biography ==
Baltasar de Mendoza y Sandoval was born in Madrid in 1653. In 1673, he became chaplain of the Colegio de San Bartolomé at the University of Salamanca. He became an oidor in Granada in 1679. In 1681, Charles II of Spain awarded him the Order of Calatrava and appointed him to the Consejo de Órdenes.

Mendoza became Bishop of Segovia in 1699, also becoming Grand Inquisitor of Spain at the same time. Following the death of Charles II in November 1700, he served on the board that governed Spain. In 1701, Philip V of Spain relieved him of the post of Grand Inquisitor, but because of a jurisdictional dispute between Madrid and the Holy See, and the absence of Philip V because of the War of the Spanish Succession, he continued to hold office until 1704.

In 1706, he was charged with treason for siding with the Austrian faction during the war. He fled to exile in Avignon, where he remained until 1713, when he was allowed to return to Spain to resume his duties as Bishop of Segovia. He died in Segovia on 4 November 1727.

== External links and additional sources ==
- Cheney, David M. "Diocese of Segovia". Catholic-Hierarchy.org. (for Chronology of Bishops) ^{[self-published]}
- Chow, Gabriel. "Diocese of Segovia (Spain)". GCatholic.org. (for Chronology of Bishops) ^{[self-published]}

Catholic Church titles
Preceded by Bartolomé de Ocampo y Mata	Bishop of Segovia; 1699–1727	Succeeded by Domingo Valentín Guerra Arteaga y Leiba
Preceded by Alonso Fernández de Córdoba y Aguilar	Grand Inquisitor of Spain; 1699–1704	Succeeded by Vidal Marín del Campo
