= Alfonso Enríquez de Santo Tomás =

Alfonso Enríquez
- Bishop of Osma, Bishop of Malaga
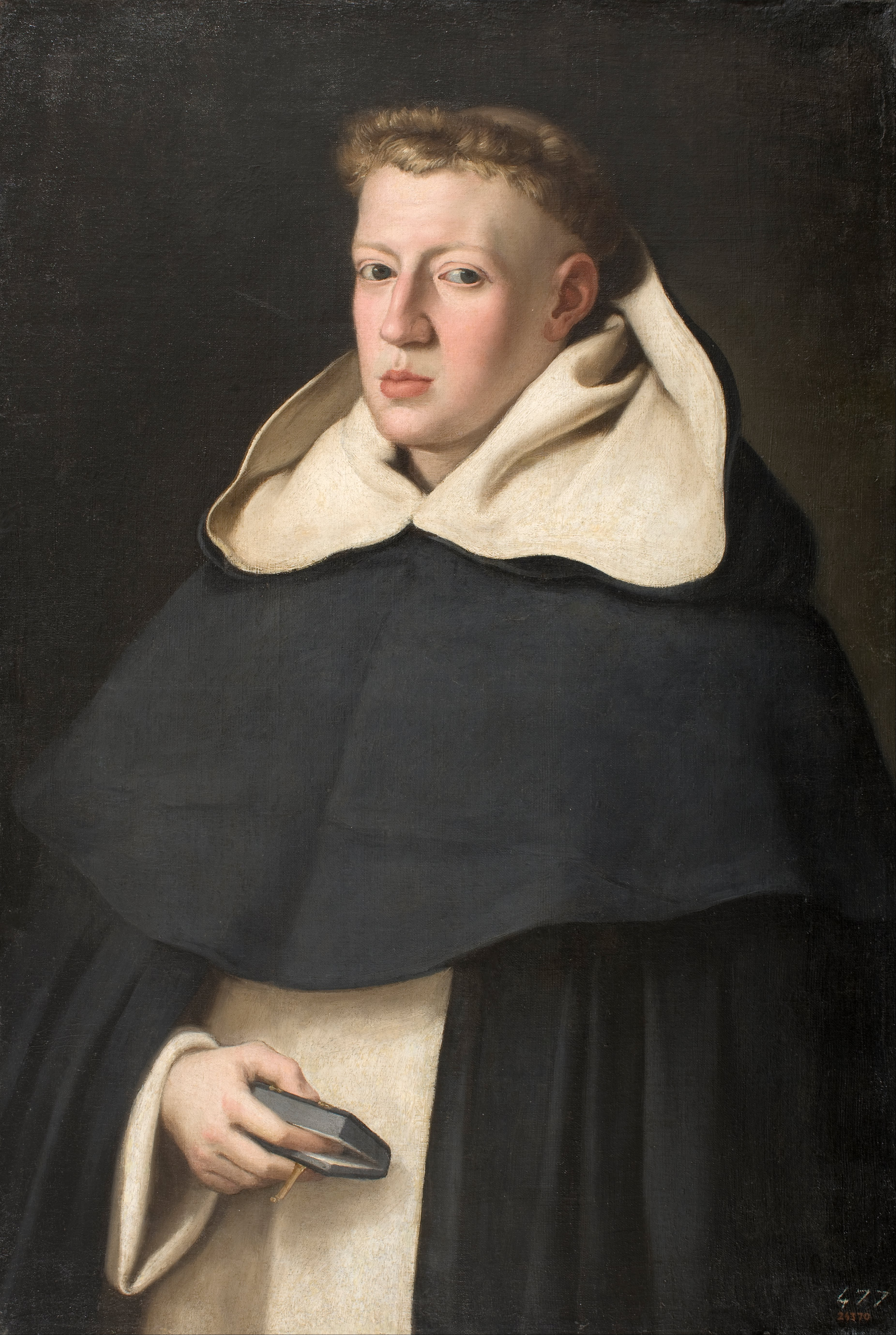
- Fray Alonso de Santo Tomás around 1648–1649 by Juan Bautista Maíno
- Born: 9 June 1631; Vélez-Málaga, Spain
- Died: 30 July 1692 (aged 61); Málaga, Spain
- House: Habsburgs of Spain (illegitimate)
- Father: Philip IV of Spain
- Mother: Constanza de Ribera y Orozco
- Religion: Roman Catholicism

Alfonso Enríquez de Santo Tomás (9 June 1631 – 30 July 1692) was a Catholic prelate who served as Bishop of Osma (1661–1663), Bishop of Plasencia (1664–1664) and Bishop of Malaga (1664–1692). He was an illegitimate son of King Felipe IV of Spain.

He was officially the "legitimate and natural son" of José Enríquez de Guzmán y de Porres, gentleman of the King's chambers, and Constanza de Ribera y Orozco, lady-in-waiting to Queen Elisabeth of Bourbon. The reality was very different: the child was the fruit of a love affair of King Felipe IV of Spain with the aforementioned lady. His legal father was forced to marry Constance in a hurry, for which he was rewarded by the monarch.

At seventeen, the young aristocrat decided to embrace Dominican religious life and renounce his noble titles. He first became Bishop of Osma and Bishop of Plasencia, before being appointed Bishop of Malaga, a position he would hold for 28 years until his death.

== Sources ==
- Real Academia de la Historia
- Catholic Hierarchy
