= Diocese of Teruel and Albarracín =

Roman Catholic diocese in Spain

Coordinates: 42.3408°N 3.7045°W

Diocese of Teruel and Albarracín Dioecesis Terulensis et Albarracinensis Diócesis de Teruel y Albarracín

Catholic
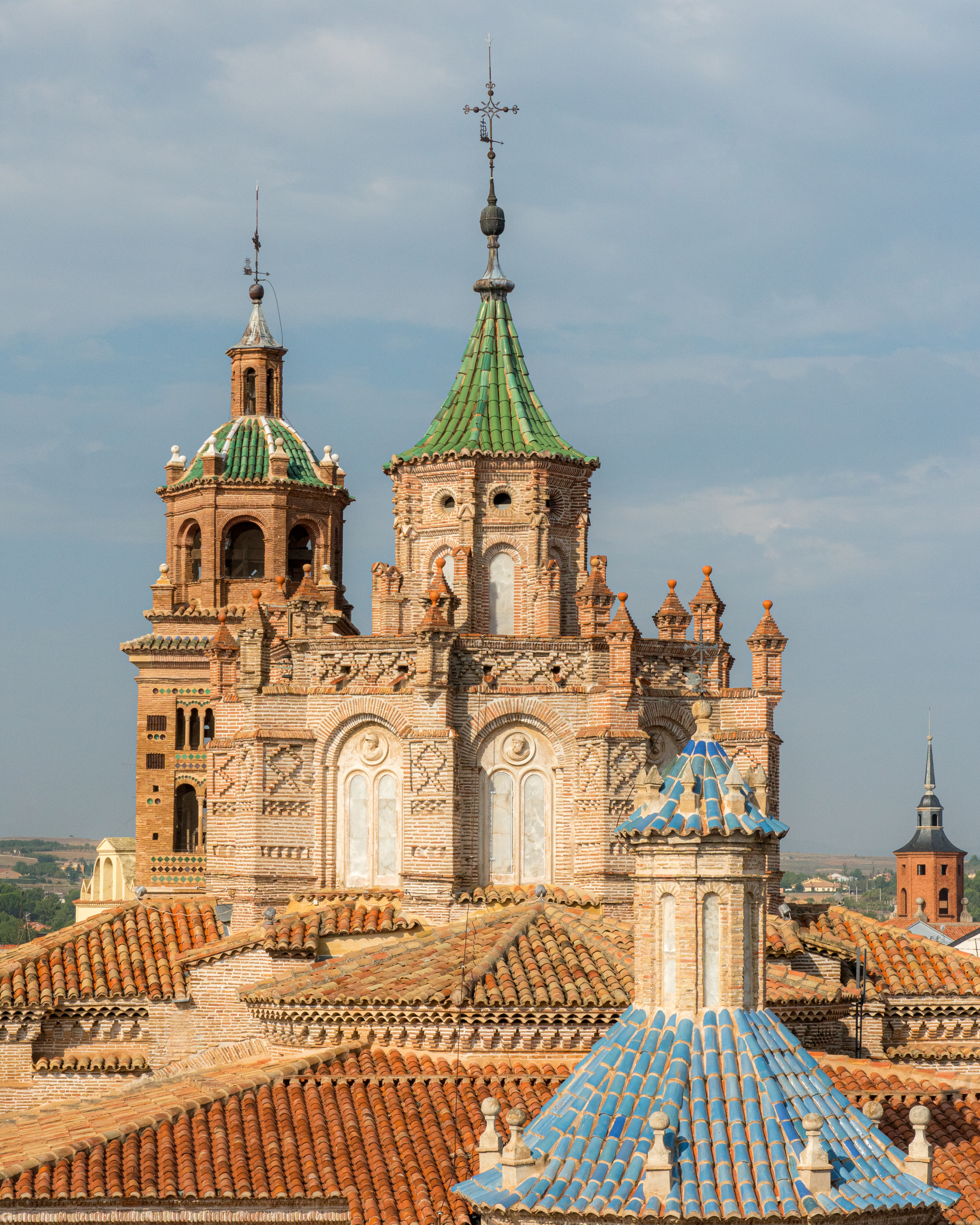
- Roof of the Teruel Cathedral

Location
- Country: Spain
- Ecclesiastical province: Zaragoza
- Metropolitan: Zaragoza

Statistics
- Area: 11,867 km^{2} (4,582 sq mi)
- Population: Total; Catholics: (as of 2010); 93,600; 89,750 (95.9%)

Information
- Denomination: Catholic
- Sui iuris church: Latin Church
- Rite: Roman Rite
- Established: 31 July 1577 (As Diocese of Teruel); 7 September 1851 (As Diocese of Teruel-Albarracín); 11 August 1984 (As Diocese of Teruel y Albarracín)
- Cathedral: Cathedral of St Peter in Teruel; Cathedral of Our Lady and St James in Albarracín

Current leadership
- Pope: Leo XIV
- Bishop: Vacant
- Metropolitan Archbishop: Carlos Manuel Escribano Subías

Map

Website
- diocesisdeteruel.org

The Diocese of Teruel and Albarracín (Latin: Terulensis et Albarracinensis) is a Latin diocese of the Catholic Church located in north-eastern Spain, in the province of Teruel, part of the autonomous community of Aragón. The diocese forms part of the ecclesiastical province of Zaragoza, thus suffragan to the Archdiocese of Zaragoza. In 1912, the diocese of Teruel comprised the civil province of the same name, excepting the town of Bechi (Castellón).

All the churches of Teruel are contemporary with its foundation (1176), as the founders built nine churches, one, Santa Maria de Mediavilla, in the centre, and the remaining eight in a circle following the circuit of the walls. The central church was made a collegiate church in 1423 and named the cathedral in 1577. It was originally built of brick and rubblework, but since the restoration in the seventeenth century it has lost its primitive character. The Doric choir stalls were the gift of Martín Terrer de Valenzuela, Bishop of Teruel, and later of Tarazona.

== History ==
=== Roman period ===
It is believed by some that Teruel and the ancient Turba are the same. Turba was the city whose disputes with the Saguntines gave Hannibal an excuse for attacking Saguntum and beginning the Second Punic War. According to the annals of Teruel it appears that Turba was not situated on the site of the present city of Teruel, but at its boundary line.

=== Middle Ages (1176–1577) ===
Teruel was founded in 1176 by Sancho Sánchez Muñoz and Blasco Garcés Marcilla. It formed a separate community and was governed by the Fuero de Sepúlveda.

King Jaime I received its support in the Conquest of Valencia (1238), and the standards of Teruel were the first to wave in the gateway of Serranos. In 1271 it joined in the war against Castile, invaded Huete and Cuenca. Teruel sided with king Pedro IV in his war against the "Union". In recognition of this the king visited the city in 1348 and conferred upon it the title of exenta (exempt).

Ferdinand and Isabella visited Teruel in 1482, took the oath in the cathedral, and received the freedom of the city. The founding of the Inquisition in 1484 produced serious changes because the converts were numerous and powerful. The inquisitor, Juan de Solivellia, was forced to leave. Property to the amount of 133,000 sueldos was confiscated and turned over to the city.

=== Diocese of Teruel (1577–1851) ===
Pope Gregory XIII at the earnest solicitations of king Philip II created the diocese in 1577. The first bishop, Juan Pérez de Artieda, was elected but not consecrated; the first bishop installed was Andrés Santos de Sampedro, who was transferred to Saragossa in 1579. In 1598, the inhabitants of Teruel abjured the Fuero de Sepúlveda before the courts of Aragon to come under the Government of Aragon.

The seminary, dedicated to St. Toribio de Mogrovejo, was founded by the bishop Francisco José Rodríguez Chico, who after the expulsion of the Jesuits in 1769 was granted the use of their magnificent college by king Charles III. During the wars of independence and the civil wars that followed, the building was taken over for military quarters and shortly afterwards the seminary was suppressed. It was re-established in 1849 by Don Antonio Lao y Cuevas, who gave his own palace for the purpose. The Jesuit college has since been restored to the order.

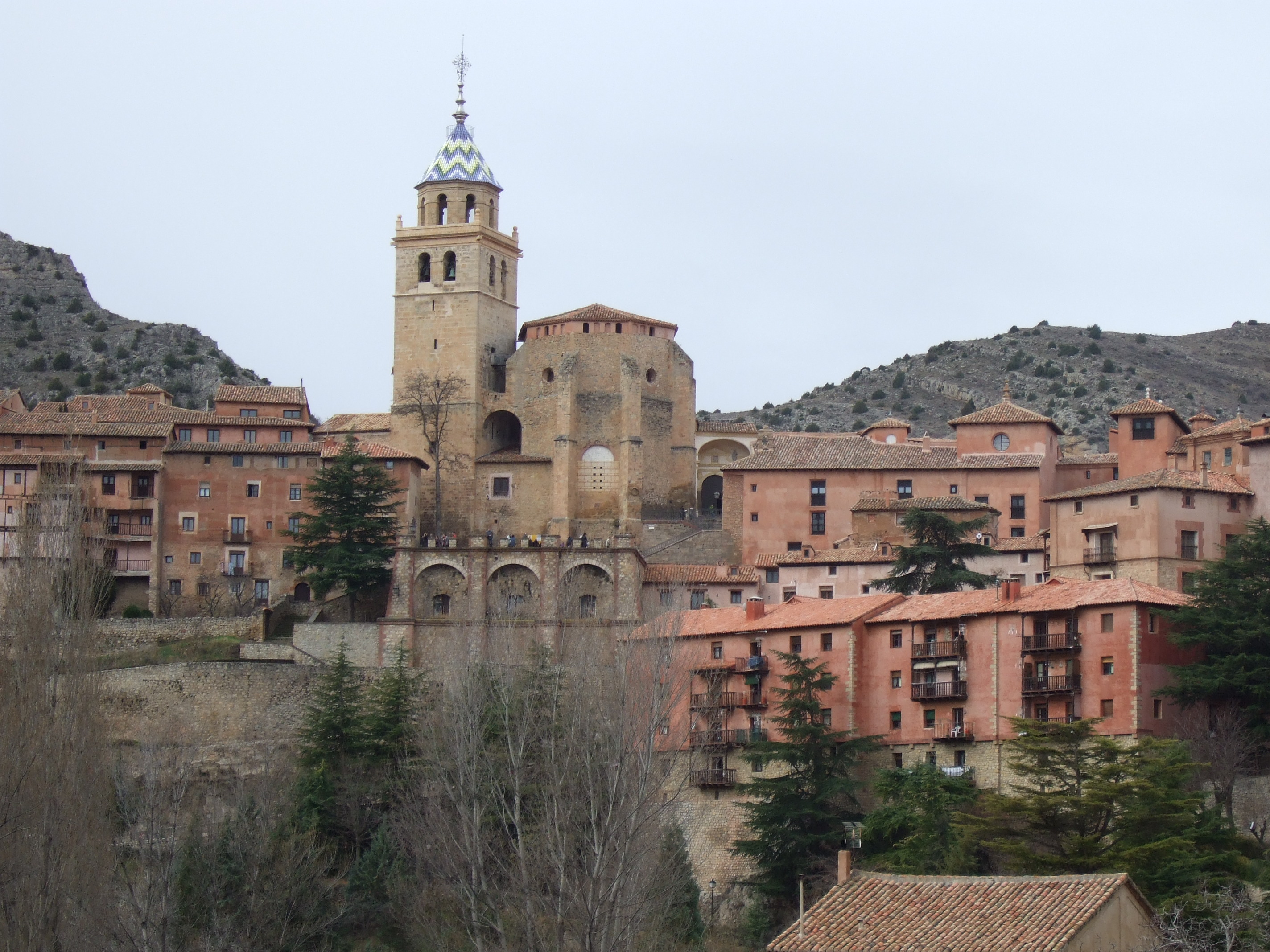
Cathedral of Albarracín

Among the distinguished citizens of Teruel must be mentioned:

- Jerónimo Ripalda, S.J.
- the jurisconsult Gaspar de Castellot.
- Miguel Jerónimo de Castellot, judge of the courts of Aragon, 1665.
- Fray Juan Cebrián de Perales, Bishop of Albarracín.
- Juan Martínez Salafranca, Viceroy of Aragon, founder of the Academy of History.

=== Diocese of Teruel-Albarracín (1852–1984) ===
In 1851 or 1852 the see became Diocese of Teruel-Albarracín (probably as a consequence of the Concordat of 1851 suppressing the Diocese of Albarracín).

=== Diocese of Teruel and Albarracín (since 1985) ===
In 1985, the see became Diocese of Teruel and Albarracín.

== Bishops ==
=== Teruel (1577 to 1851) ===
. . . . . 1577–1578: Juan Pérez de Artieda — (Elected)

1. 1578–1579: Andrés Santos de Sampedro
2. 1580–1594: Jaime Jimeno de Lobera
3. 1596–1611: Martín Terrer de Valenzuela
4. 1614–1624: Tomás Cortés de Sangüesa
5. 1625–1633: Fernando de Valdés y Llanos
6. 1633–1635: Pedro Apaolaza Ramírez
7. 1635–1644: Juan Cebrián Pedro
8. 1644–1647: Domingo Abad Herta
9. 1647–1672: Diego Chueca
10. --------–1673: Diego Francés de Urritigoyti y Lerma
11. 1674–1682: Andrés Aznar Navés
12. 1683–1700: Jerónimo Zolivera
13. 1701–1717: Lamberto Manuel López
14. 1720–1731: Pedro Felipe Miranda y Ponce de León
15. 1732–1755: Francisco Pérez de Prado y Cuesta
16. 1755–1757: Francisco Javier Pérez Baroja y Muro
17. 1757–1780: Francisco José Rodríguez Chico
18. 1780–1794: Roque Martín Merino
19. 1795–1799: Félix Rico
20. 1800–1802: Francisco Javier de Lizana y Beaumont
21. 1802–1814: Blas Joaquín Álvarez de Palma
22. 1815–1825: Felipe Montoya Díez
23. 1825–1827: Jacinto Rodríguez Rico
24. 1827–1831: Diego Martínez Carlón y Teruel
25. 1831–1833: José Asensio Ocón y Toledo
26. 1847–1850: Antonio Lao y Cuevas
27. 1850–1851: Jaime José Soler Roquer

=== Teruel-Albarracín (1852 to 1984) ===
1. 1852–1861: Francisco Landeira Sevilla
2. 1861–1869: Francisco de Paula Jiménez Muñoz
3. 1874–1876: Victoriano Guisasola Rodríguez
4. 1876–1880: Francisco de Paula Moreno y Andreu
5. 1880–1890: Antonio Ibáñez Galiano
6. 1891–1894: Maximiliano Fernández del Rincón y Soto Dávila
7. 1894–1896: Antonio Estalella y Sivilla
8. 1896–1905: Juan Comes Vidal
9. 1905–1934: Juan Antón de la Fuente
10. 1935–1939: Anselmo Polanco y Fontecha
11. 1944–1968: León Villuendas Polo
12. 1968–1972: Juan Ricote Alonso
13. 1974–1984: Damián Iguacén Borau

=== Bishops of Teruel and Albarracín (1985 to present) ===
1. 1985–2003: Antonio Ángel Algora Hernando
2. 2004–2009: José Manuel Lorca Planes
3. 2010–2016: Carlos Manuel Escribano Subias
4. 2016–2021: Antonio Gómez Cantero
5. 2021–2025: José Antonio Satué Huerto

== See also ==
- List of the Roman Catholic dioceses of Spain.
