= Abolition of the Spanish Inquisition =

Historical process of suppressing the Spanish Inquisition between 1808 and 1834

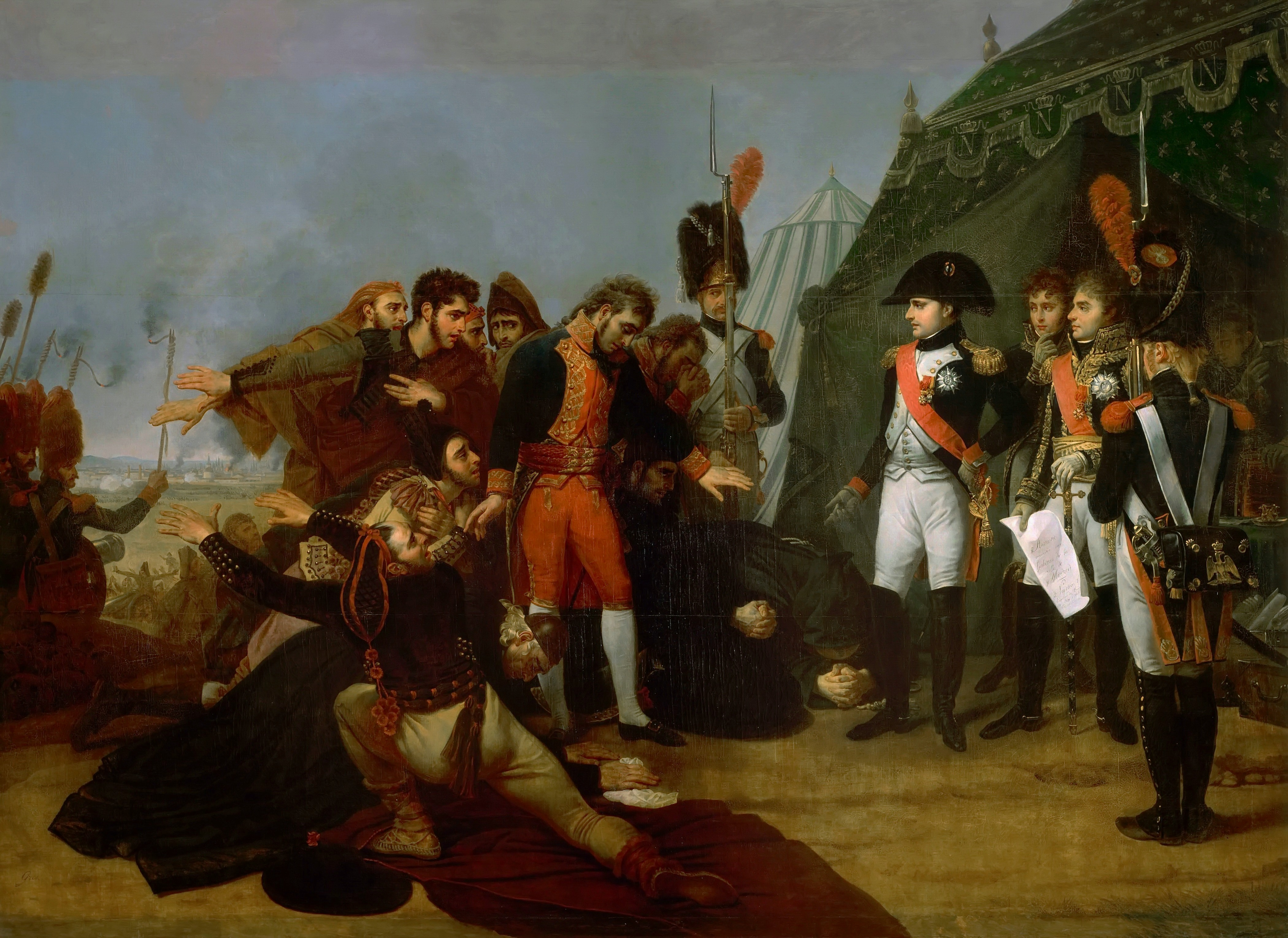
Napoleon Accepts the Surrender of Madrid, 4 December 1808 (1810), oil on canvas by Antoine-Jean Gros

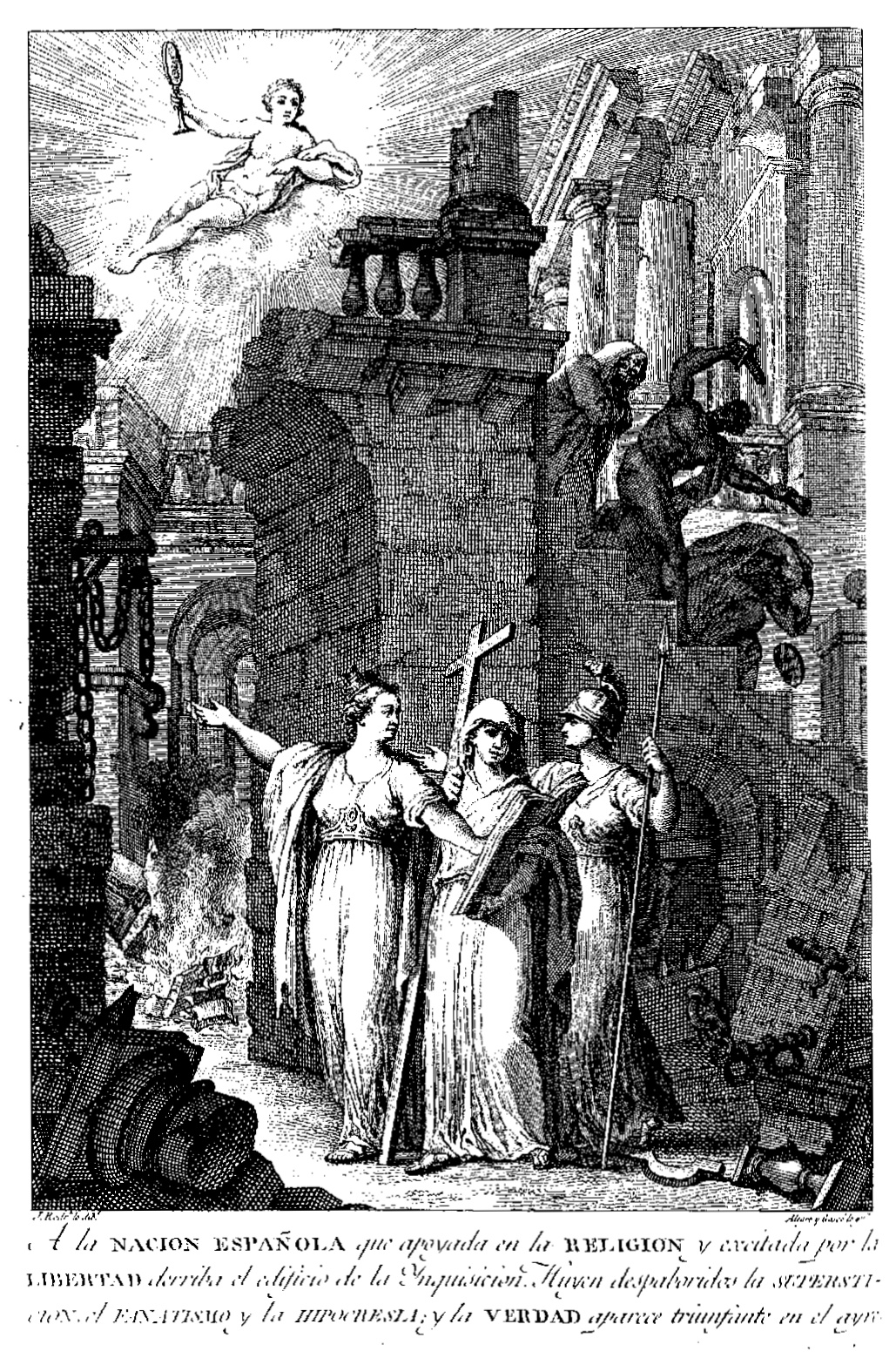
Allegory of the abolition of the Inquisition by the Cortes of Cádiz. Engraving by Manuel Alegre and Pedro Nolasco Gascó from a drawing by Antonio Rodríguez Onofre used to illustrate the printed text of Discusión del proyecto de decreto sobre el Tribunal de la Inquisición, National Press, Cádiz, 1813. Inscription: “To the SPANISH NATION which, supported by RELIGION and stirred by LIBERTY, tears down the edifice of the Inquisition. SUPERSTITION, FANATICISM, and HYPOCRISY flee in terror; and TRUTH appears triumphant in the air.” Biblioteca Nacional de España.

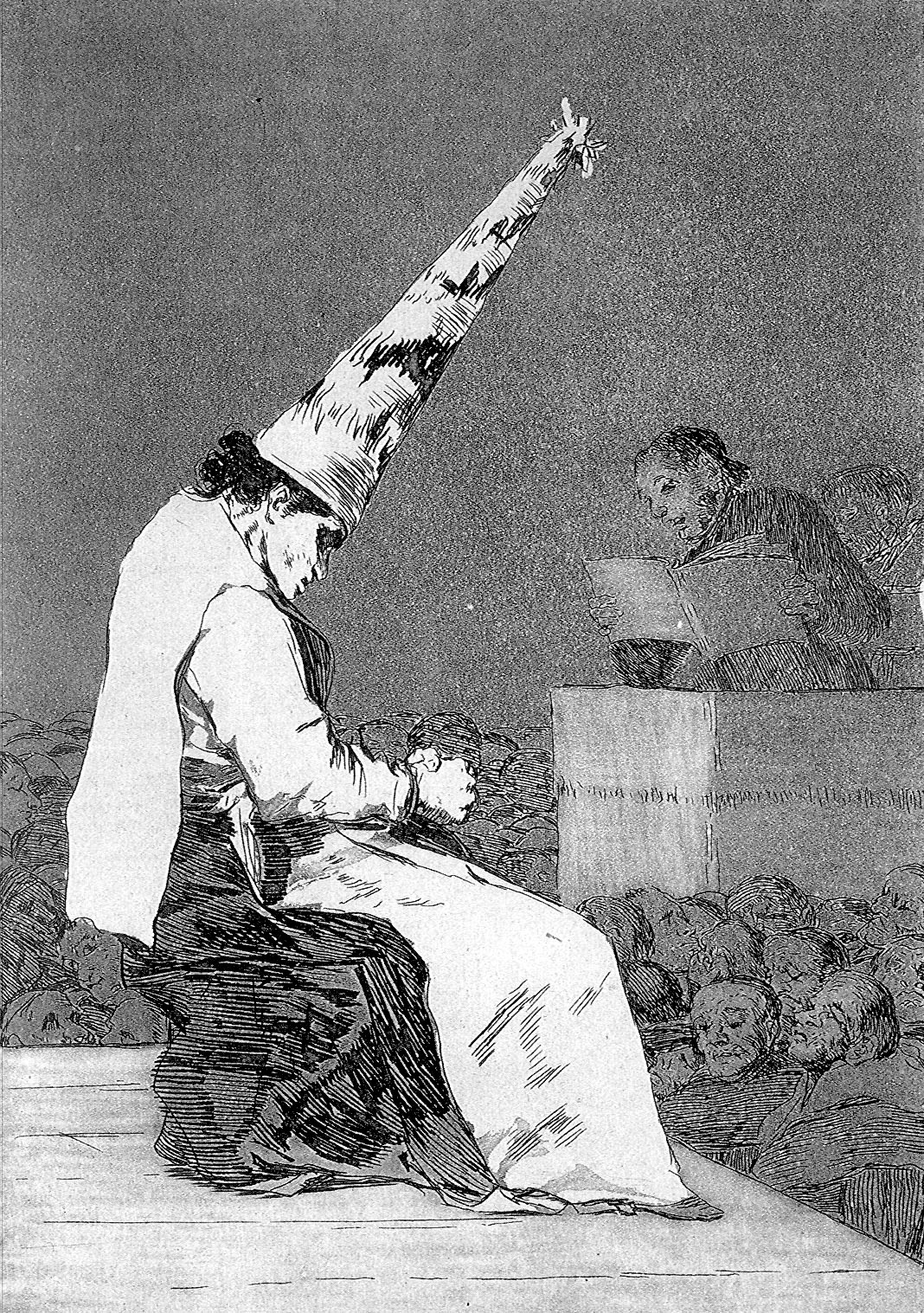
Prisoner of the Spanish Inquisition, wearing a coroza and sanbenito during an auto-da-fé while an inquisitor reads the sentence. Plate no. 23 from Goya’s series Los Caprichos.

The abolition of the Spanish Inquisition occurred in four stages. In December 1808 the Spanish Inquisition was suppressed by Napoleon Bonaparte through the Decrees of Chamartín, which were applied in “afrancesado” Spain. In “patriotic” Spain, however, abolition occurred several years later, when the Cortes of Cádiz decreed its suppression on 28 February 1813. In July 1814 the Inquisition was restored by King Ferdinand VII together with the entire Ancien Régime, ordering that all decrees of the Cortes be “removed from the course of time.” Yet on 9 March 1820, compelled by the triumph of the Riego uprising, which reinstated the Spanish Constitution of 1812, the king again abolished it. After the restoration of his absolute powers in October 1823—thanks to the intervention of the Hundred Thousand Sons of Saint Louis ending the Trienio Liberal—Ferdinand VII did not re-establish the Inquisition; instead, certain dioceses created Juntas de Fe. In July 1834, at the beginning of the regency of Maria Christina of Bourbon, the moderate liberal government of Francisco Martínez de la Rosa issued a decree whose first article declared: “The Tribunal of the Inquisition is definitively suppressed.” This was the fourth and final abolition of the Inquisition in Spain.

== Background: the Spanish Inquisition in the 18th century ==
=== Decline of the Inquisition? ===
There are discrepancies among historians when assessing the activity of the Inquisition in the 18th century AD. While some speak of a “decline” of the Holy Office, especially in its second half, others prefer to use terms such as ‘accommodation’ and “restructuring.” Certainly, in the 18th century AD, there was a decline in the activity of the Inquisition, and the privileges of the inquisitors were questioned and some were abolished, such as exemption from paying taxes or housing troops.

However, the Inquisition remained remarkably active throughout the 18th century, and it was not until 1780 that there was a significant drop in the number of cases, although between that date and 1820 some 50,000 people were reported to the Inquisition.

What historians who have researched the subject more recently do agree on is that in the 18th century AD, especially in the second half, there was a change in the crimes dealt with by the Inquisition. As the “heretics” who had been its main target—Judaizers, Protestants, and Moriscos—had almost disappeared, the Holy Office now focused on the defenders of new enlightened ideas and on crimes considered “minor,” such as blasphemy, pious women, superstitions, witchcraft, bigamy, and other practices contrary to Catholic morality, especially “solicitation.” Thus, “in the 18th century AD, the Inquisition became the guardian of Catholic morality and the enemy of new ideas”—precisely in the second half of the 18th century AD, the most frequent crime was that of propositions: “statements, sayings, or expressions that could be interpreted in a non-Catholic or heterodox sense.”

Clergy and lay people who were branded as Jansenists by their opponents were subject to special surveillance by the Inquisition. These individuals advocated an “enlightened” reform of religion based on a more internal experience of faith, making it more rational by eliminating superstitious practices and the external pomp of worship. They also advocated changes in the organization of the Church, in accordance with the episcopalist approaches that were widespread in Europe at the time, which called into question the very existence of the Inquisition, since it was considered that it was the bishops who should deal with moral and faith issues.

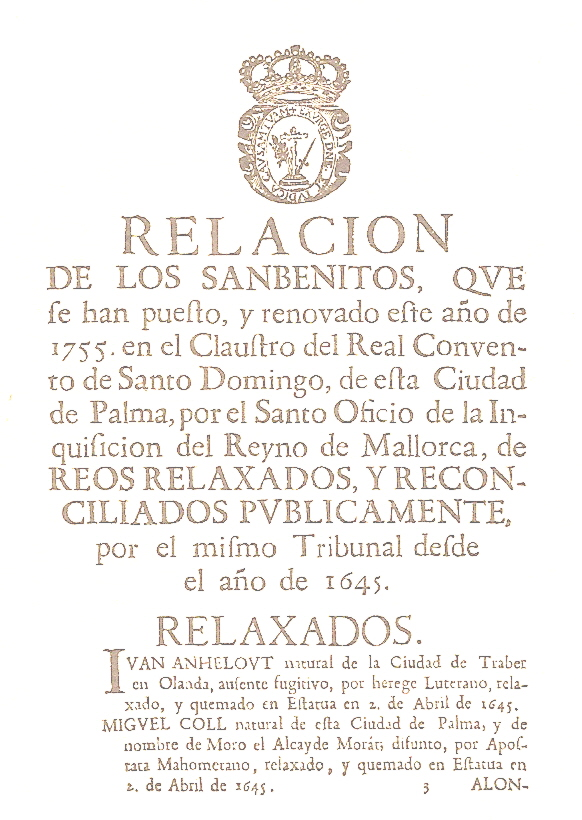
First page of the “Report of the sanbenitos placed and renewed this year 1755 in the Cloister of the Royal Convent of Santo Domingo of the City of Palma, by the Holy Office of the Inquisition of the Kingdom of Mallorca, of prisoners relaxed and publicly reconciled by the same tribunal since 1645.”

As a consequence, many writers, politicians, soldiers, and clergy were accused and imprisoned by the Inquisition, though most were never sentenced. For some, imprisonment caused irreversible harm. The Augustinian Pedro Centeno went insane and spent the rest of his life confined to a convent. “The problem,” write La Parra and Casado, “lay less in receiving a guilty verdict than in enduring a perpetual state of uncertainty.”

Proof of this was the trial of Pablo de Olavide, an enlightened figure and official under Charles III of Spain, who was sentenced in 1778 to eight years' imprisonment in a convent, although he escaped after two years, for being a “heretic, infamous and rotten member of the religion,” which fueled the discrediting of the Inquisition in Spain and the rest of Europe

The Inquisition “softened” its methods somewhat, attempting to adapt to the new times. In 1748, it abolished the penalty of galley slavery, and around the same time, the custom of hanging the sambenitos (penitential robes) of the condemned in churches to perpetuate the infamy of their sin on their descendants was abandoned. The treatment of prisoners in secret prisons also became less rigorous, although the use of torture to obtain confessions was not abandoned.

The first reason for introducing these changes was the advance of Enlightenment ideas, which inevitably affected the Inquisition—some inquisitors, such as Felipe Bertrán, Grand Inquisitor between 1775 and 1783, shared the new ideas, although most opposed them. The second reason was the regalist policy of the Bourbon monarchy, which sought to reform the Inquisition, leading to considerable conflict between the Holy Office and the Crown, although its abolition was never considered. The monarchy's objective was summarized by the Count of Floridablanca, minister of Charles III, in his well-known Confidential Instruction of 1787: "The king’s first obligation is to protect the Catholic religion throughout this vast monarchy… while combining due respect for the Holy See with the defense of royal preeminence and authority."

=== Bourbon policy toward the Inquisition ===
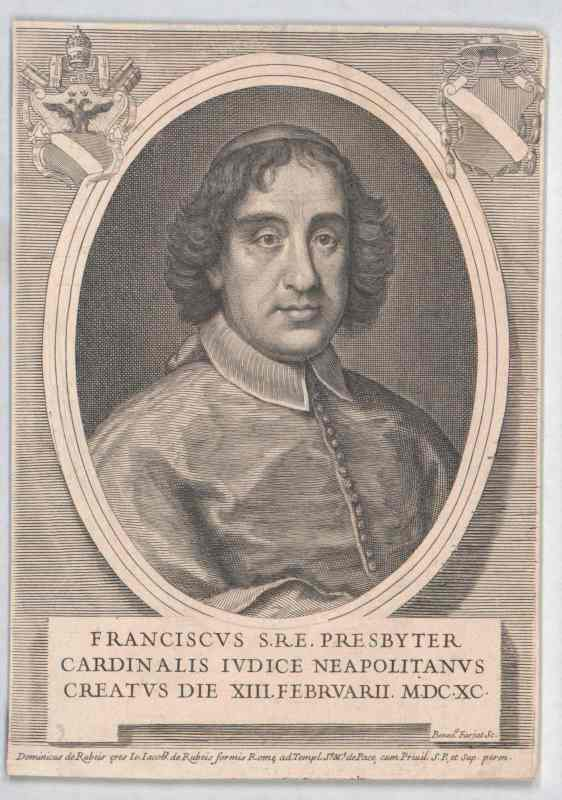
Francesco del Giudice, inquisitor general under Philip V of Spain.

Philip V received the full support of the Inquisition during the War of the Spanish Succession, but after the conflict he instructed Melchor de Macanaz, fiscal of the Council of Castile, to draft a report reinforcing royal authority over the Holy Office. The request stemmed from the opposition of the inquisitor general, Francesco del Giudice, to Macanaz’s December 1713 memorandum, which proposed limiting papal influence in the Spanish Church. Philip V dismissed del Giudice and commissioned Macanaz’s report.

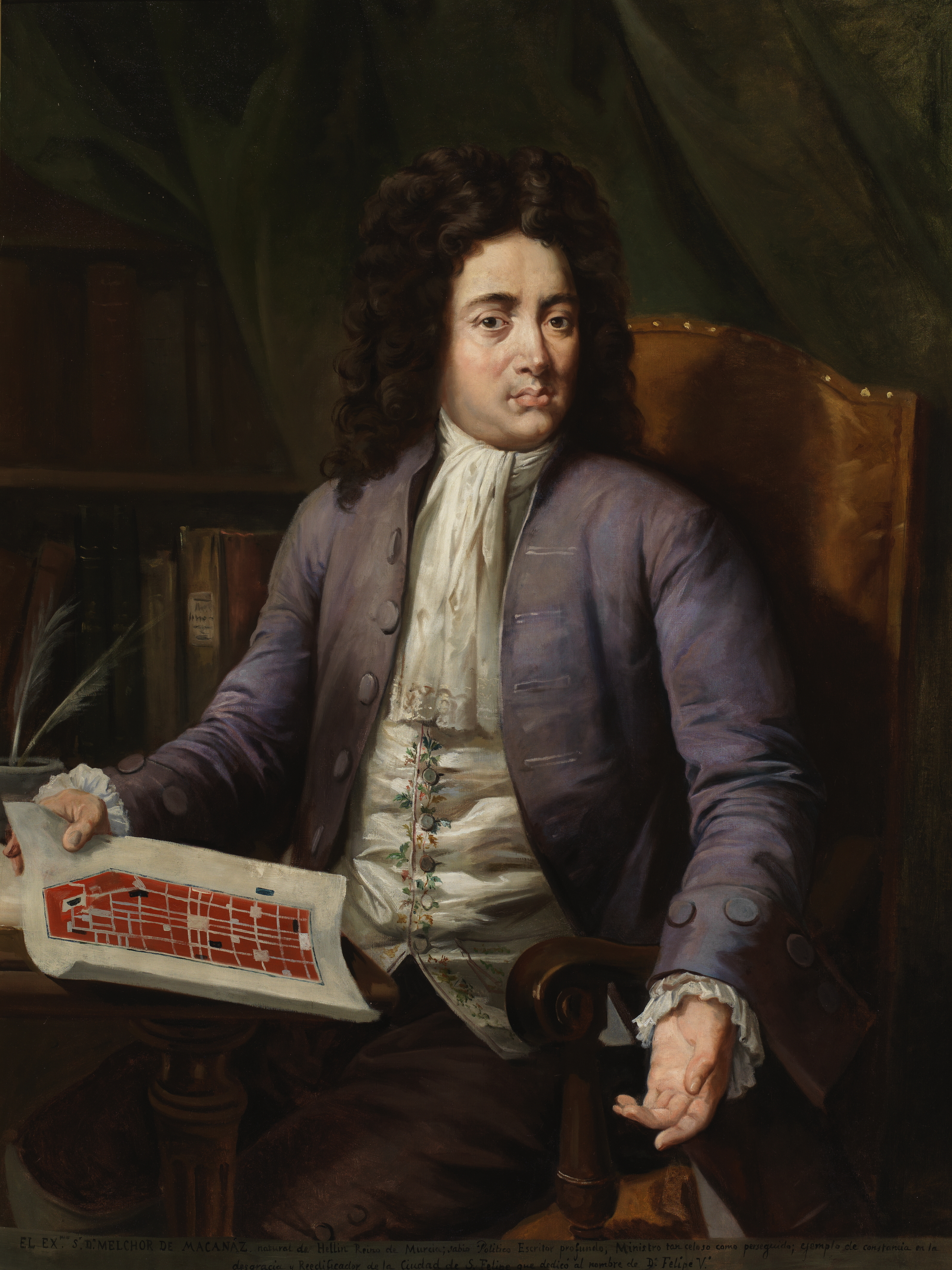
Melchor Rafael de Macanaz.

In his report on the Inquisition, Macanaz warned the king that the Holy Office had encroached on the prerogatives of the Crown and had acquired a degree of autonomy and immunity that was difficult for an absolute monarch to tolerate. What Macanaz proposed was not to abolish the institution but to reinforce the monarch's authority over it, reducing its scope of competence to strictly spiritual matters and subordinating it to the royal courts when it came to classifying crimes, all within the context of a clearly regalist policy.

However, Macanaz's proposal did not go ahead because the opinion of Philip V's advisors was divided on the issue of the Inquisition and because Macanaz ended up falling into disgrace at court and was banished from the kingdom in 1715—he was not allowed to return until two years after Philip V's death in 1746, remaining in prison until his death in 1760.

From then on, the attitude of the Bourbon ministers towards the Inquisition can be described as ambiguous, as it was asked to continue defending Catholic orthodoxy while at the same time helping to eradicate certain “superstitious” practices that hindered the progress of enlightenment. Thus, enlightened prelates were appointed to the position of Grand Inquisitor, such as Felipe Bertrán, Bishop of Salamanca, appointed in 1764, while the lower ranks of the institution continued to be made up of “ignorant clergy clinging to their meager livelihoods and privileges.”

At the same time, what Henry Kamen has called “disillusionment” with the Inquisition was spreading, caused, among other reasons, by contact with the outside world. A pharmacist arrested in 1707 by the Inquisition in La Laguna (Tenerife) declared: "that in France one could live freely because there was neither the strictness nor the constraints found in Spain and Portugal; in France no one sought to know who each person was or what religion he professed, and thus anyone who lived honorably could be whatever he wished."

The first effective measures to bind the Inquisition more closely to the Crown were taken during the reign of Charles III. The opportunity arose when the Grand Inquisitor Manuel Quintano Bonifaz banned the circulation of the French work Exposición de la doctrina cristiana (Exposition of Christian Doctrine) by Mesenguy, considering it Jansenist—as it had been declared in a papal brief—despite the fact that the book had obtained royal license. When the king ordered him to lift the ban, the Grand Inquisitor refused and was banished from court. Shortly thereafter, the king issued a royal decree in 1768 limiting the Inquisition's powers to censor books. When the inquisitor reacted against this measure, the prosecutors of the Council of Castile, Pedro Rodríguez de Campomanes and José Moñino, future Count of Floridablanca, reminded him that his authority came from the king and hinted that the Inquisition could be abolished “if the public interest so required.” Two years later, another royal decree of 1770 reduced the Inquisition's jurisdiction to crimes of contumacious heresy and apostasy, with the rest being transferred to the royal courts, although blasphemy, sodomy, and bigamy remained divided between the two. In 1784, inquisitors were prohibited from prosecuting nobles, ministers of the Crown, magistrates, and army officers without the express permission of the king.

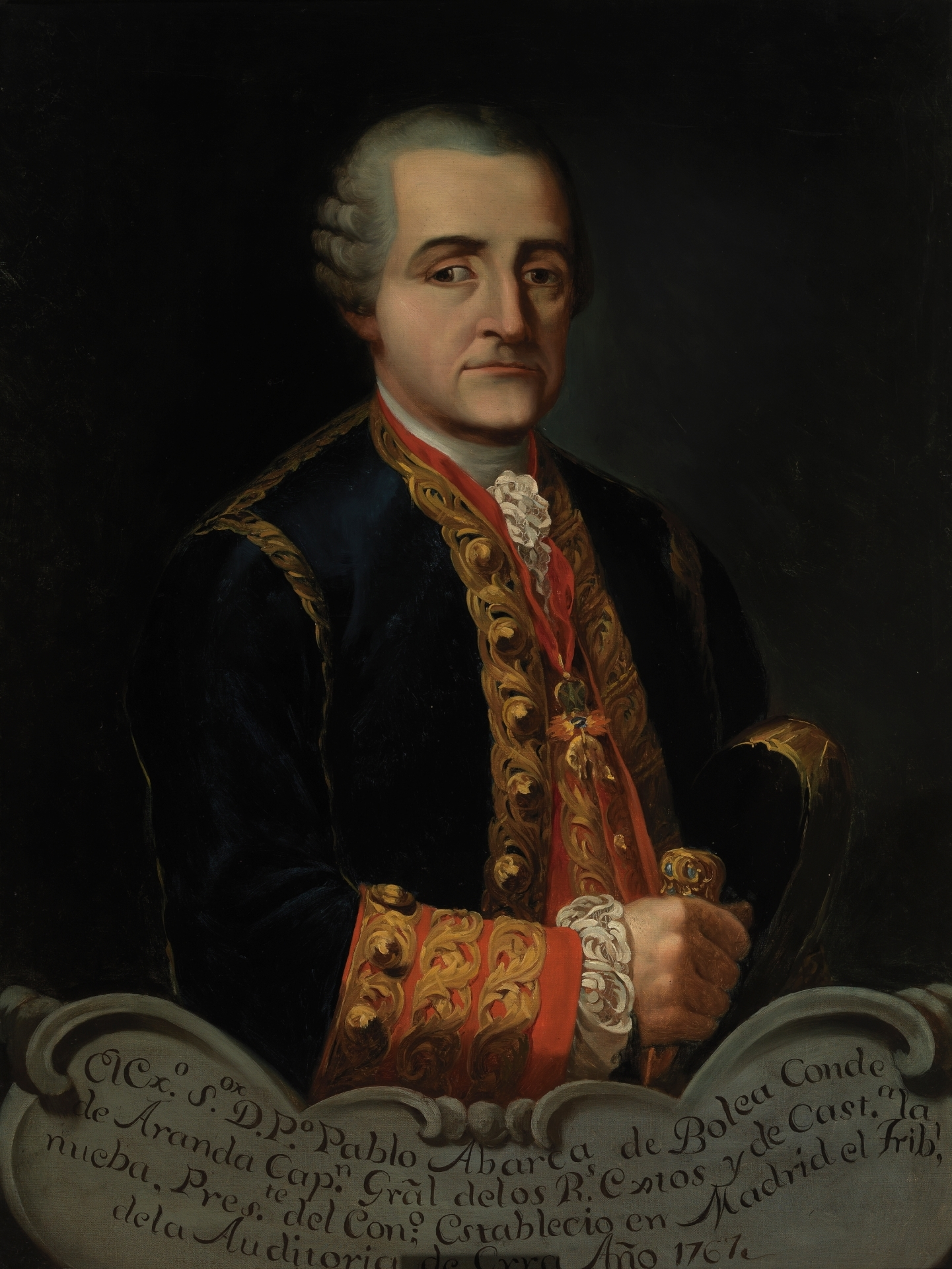
Portrait of the Count of Aranda by Francisco Jover y Casanova.

One of the first to speak out in favor of abolishing the Inquisition was the Count of Aranda, who in 1761 wrote a letter to Minister Ricardo Wall from Warsaw, where he was serving as ambassador, saying that “the Inquisition is unnecessary; it is enough to follow the Supreme Pontiff in his beliefs, and that is all that a prince and people who are children of his church can do.” In the letter, he referred to the rejection that the Holy Office aroused throughout Europe, and that it only served “the clergy and friars” to intimidate the laity and “prohibit anything that might open their eyes.” Aranda earned a reputation as an enemy of the Inquisition and was congratulated for this by Voltaire.

Criticism intensified, both inside and outside Spain, during the trial of the enlightened royal official Pablo de Olavide, who was arrested in 1776 and sentenced by the Inquisition in 1778 to eight years' imprisonment in a convent for “heresy”—although he managed to escape after two years and went into exile in France. Even King Frederick II of Prussia was enraged by what had happened and in a letter sent to the French philosopher D'Alembert, one of the two editors of L'Encyclopédie, he said

"One shudders with indignation at seeing the Inquisition reestablished in Spain."

Yet Charles III never contemplated abolishing the Holy Office. In the Instrucción reservada of 1787, Floridablanca explicitly supported “favoring and protecting” the Inquisition as long as it remained focused on pursuing heresy, apostasy, and superstition. During the period of heightened fear following the French Revolution—the so-called “Floridablanca panic”—the Inquisition’s role was strengthened to block revolutionary ideas, and between 1789 and 1792 it enjoyed a final moment of prominence.

=== Godoy’s attempted reform ===
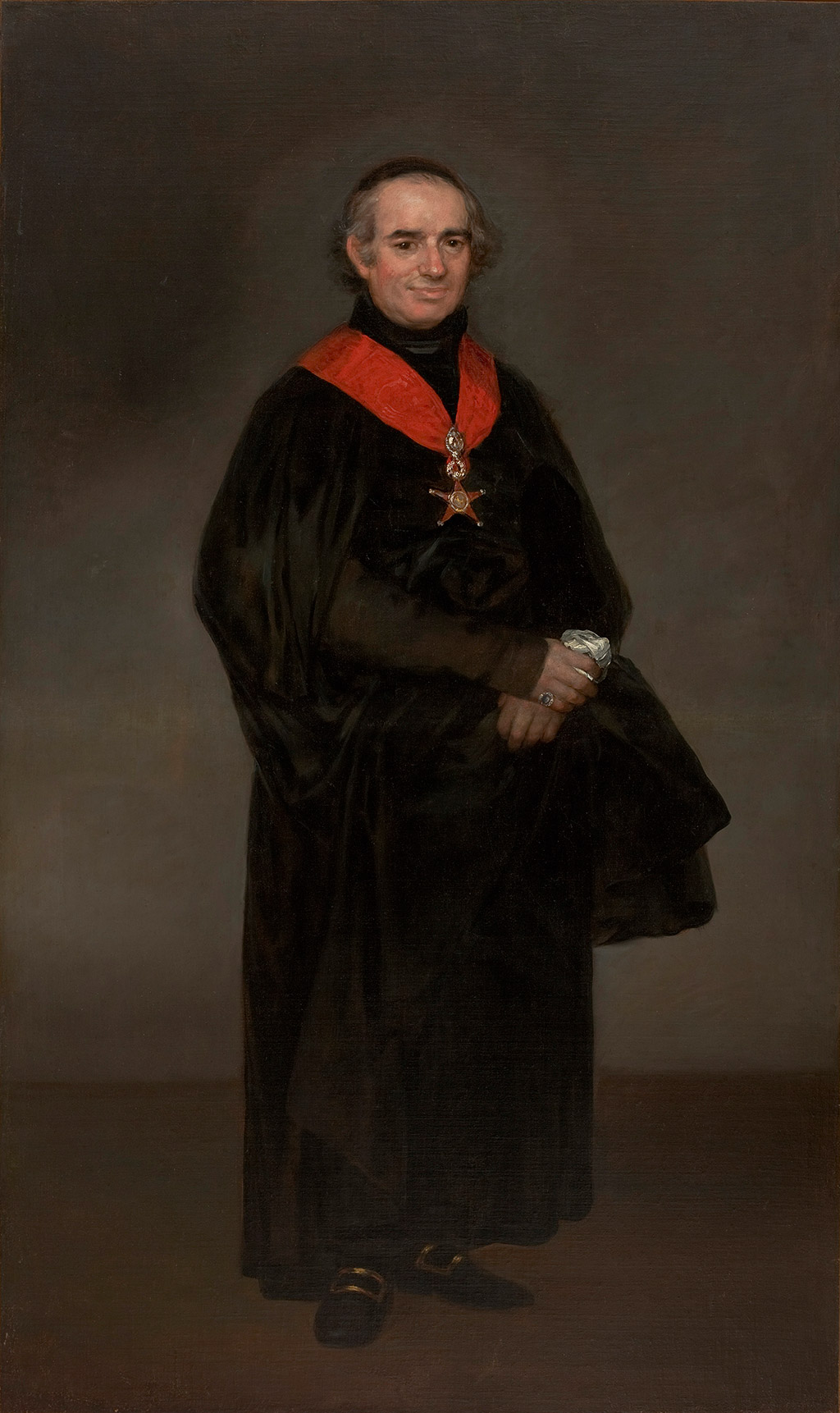
Portrait of Juan Antonio Llorente by Francisco de Goya (1810–1811), showing the cross of Commander of the Royal Order of Spain.

A few months after being appointed Secretary of State and of the Office by Charles IV in November 1792, Manuel Godoy persuaded the king to appoint Manuel Abad y Lasierra as the new Grand Inquisitor. Abad y Lasierra was a friar with progressive religious ideas who was branded a Jansenist by conservative sectors, and his appointment was therefore not well received by the inquisitors. Shortly thereafter, in July 1793, Godoy asked him for a report on the Inquisition with “any observations he deemed appropriate to make.” Abad y Lasierra, with the help of the secretary of the Court of the Inquisition (the Madrid court), Juan Antonio Llorente, presented a few weeks later a plan to reform the Holy Office in terms of the appointment and exercise of qualifiers, accompanied by a letter suggesting the abolition of the Inquisition. However, the proposal was ignored, among other reasons, because at that time the monarchy of Charles IV was in the midst of the War of the Convention against the First French Republic, which some anti-Enlightenment preachers such as Fray Diego de Cádiz had declared a “war of religion against impious France.”

Conservative ecclesiastical sectors and the Supreme Council of the Spanish Inquisition pressured the king to remove Abad y Lasierra, succeeding in June 1794. He was replaced by the Archbishop of Toledo, Francisco Antonio de Lorenzana, known as an enlightened cleric but loyal defender of the Inquisition. Godoy instructed him to combat “the damage caused by the reading of prohibited books, by study of the rights of man, by disrespect toward supreme authorities, and by the insolence of modern writers.”

The monarchy’s difficulty in controlling the Inquisition became evident in the case of Ramón de Salas y Cortés, a professor at the University of Salamanca, who in January 1792 was denounced for immoral conduct and reading prohibited books, later charged with “offensive and injurious propositions” and doctrines contrary to Catholic dogma. After fifteen months of secret imprisonment in Madrid, he was acquitted, but political maneuvering led to a second trial. In late 1796 the Madrid tribunal sentenced him only to a minor penalty—abjuration de levi and four years’ exile—but his health, honor, and career were irreparably damaged. “The Salas case,” historians note, “made clear that even when the final sentence was mild, the physical and moral suffering inflicted by the Inquisition remained immense.”

King Charles IV and Godoy still refused to confront defenders of the Inquisition despite Godoy’s private criticism of its abuses. He wrote to Eugenio Llaguno y Amirola: "The Inquisition proceeds violently and without acknowledging any authority; this is harmful, and the kingdom’s laws are gravely altered by this confusion… Even the most cautious servant of the king may be slandered by the whims of someone with influence at this tribunal. The king does not know the cases it initiates or the penalties it imposes; he insists that this harmful custom must end, and that weekly reports be given of the tribunal’s actions."

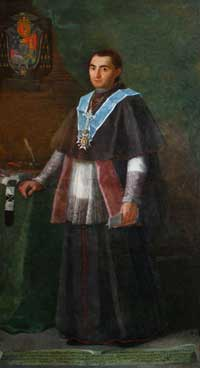
Ramón José de Arce, inquisitor general.

In 1796, when the trial against Ramón de Salas was about to conclude, Manuel Godoy himself was denounced to the Inquisition by three friars for leading a licentious life and for being suspected of atheism, thus fulfilling his assertion that “even the most cautious servant of the king is liable to be caught and defamed.” The complaint was unsuccessful despite pressure from the Archbishop of Seville, Antonio Despuig y Dameto, and the queen's confessor, Rafael de Múzquiz. Godoy's reaction was to send these clergymen to Rome along with the Grand Inquisitor, whose position was filled by Ramón José de Arce, a man who was willing to obey the Secretary of State. Godoy also revived the idea of reforming the Inquisition.

Godoy once again turned to Juan Antonio Llorente, who presented a report entitled Discursos sobre el orden de procesar en los tribunales de la Inquisición (Discourses on the Order of Prosecution in the Courts of the Inquisition), in which he proposed a thorough reform of the institution and, in addition to limiting its powers to matters of faith and cases of heresy in the strict sense, transferring the rest to royal or episcopal jurisdiction. According to Llorente, in line with the episcopalism and regalism defended by most Spanish enlightened thinkers, bishops were better prepared to deal with matters of faith than ignorant monks who introduced “slavery of the spirit to the misfortune of humanity” and were also appointed by the political powers, which was not the case with the inquisitors. But Godoy did not carry out the project, despite the radical opposition of the Spanish enlightened elite to the Inquisition and external pressure for its abolition, especially from the French Republic, a new ally of the monarchy of Charles IV since the signing of the Treaty of San Ildefonso (1796). “Did [Godoy] lack courage or strength? Perhaps both,” say La Parra and Casado José Nicolás de Azara, ambassador to Rome, wrote to Godoy in the summer of 1797:

Why does Your Excellency not put an end to a tribunal that dishonors us in the eyes of all nations, and restore its jurisdiction to the bishops, since, after all, they are inquisitors established by Jesus Christ, and ours by the Pope? - La Parra López y Casado (2009, p. 53)

Around the same time, the Reasoned Notice to the Religion and Clergy by French constitutional abbot Henri Grégoire, one of the main European promoters of the renewal of the Church, circulated in Spain. In it, he invited Godoy to abolish the Inquisition, a proposal he reiterated in February of the following year with the Letter from Citizen Grégoire, bishop of Blois, to Ramón José de Arce, archbishop of Burgos and Grand Inquisitor of Spain. The letter was immediately banned by the Holy Office, and in it Grégoire argued that the existence of the Inquisition constituted “a habitual slander against the Catholic Church,” which should practice charity instead of violence. “When I see Christians persecuting others, I feel that they have not read the Gospel,” Grégoire stated in the Letter.

The “Letter” was refuted, among others, by the canon and consultant to the Holy Office Joaquín Lorenzo Villanueva, despite the fact that he was considered a Jansenist and a supporter of Church reform.

=== Reform attempts by Jovellanos and Urquijo ===
The new Secretary of State for Grace and Justice, the well-known Enlightenment figure Gaspar Melchor de Jovellanos, appointed by Charles IV in November 1797, attempted to reform the Inquisition. He seized the opportunity offered by a dispute that had arisen in Granada between the dean of the cathedral and the city’s Inquisition tribunal. The conflict originated when the Inquisition ordered the closure of a confessional in one of the city’s monasteries without notifying the dean. The matter reached the royal court, and Jovellanos requested the opinions of five bishops. All sided with the dean; one of them, Antonio Tavira, then bishop of Burgo de Osma, launched a severe critique of the Inquisition. Among other things, Tavira asserted that the Inquisition had stripped the sacrament of penance of its true meaning by compelling confessors to ask penitents whether they had held opinions contrary to religion or possessed prohibited books. He proposed several changes, including stripping the Inquisition of its censorship of books, bringing inquisitorial procedure into line with common law, allowing the condemned to appeal to the king, and abolishing torture. In carefully veiled terms, he also expressed his desire that the institution itself be suppressed.

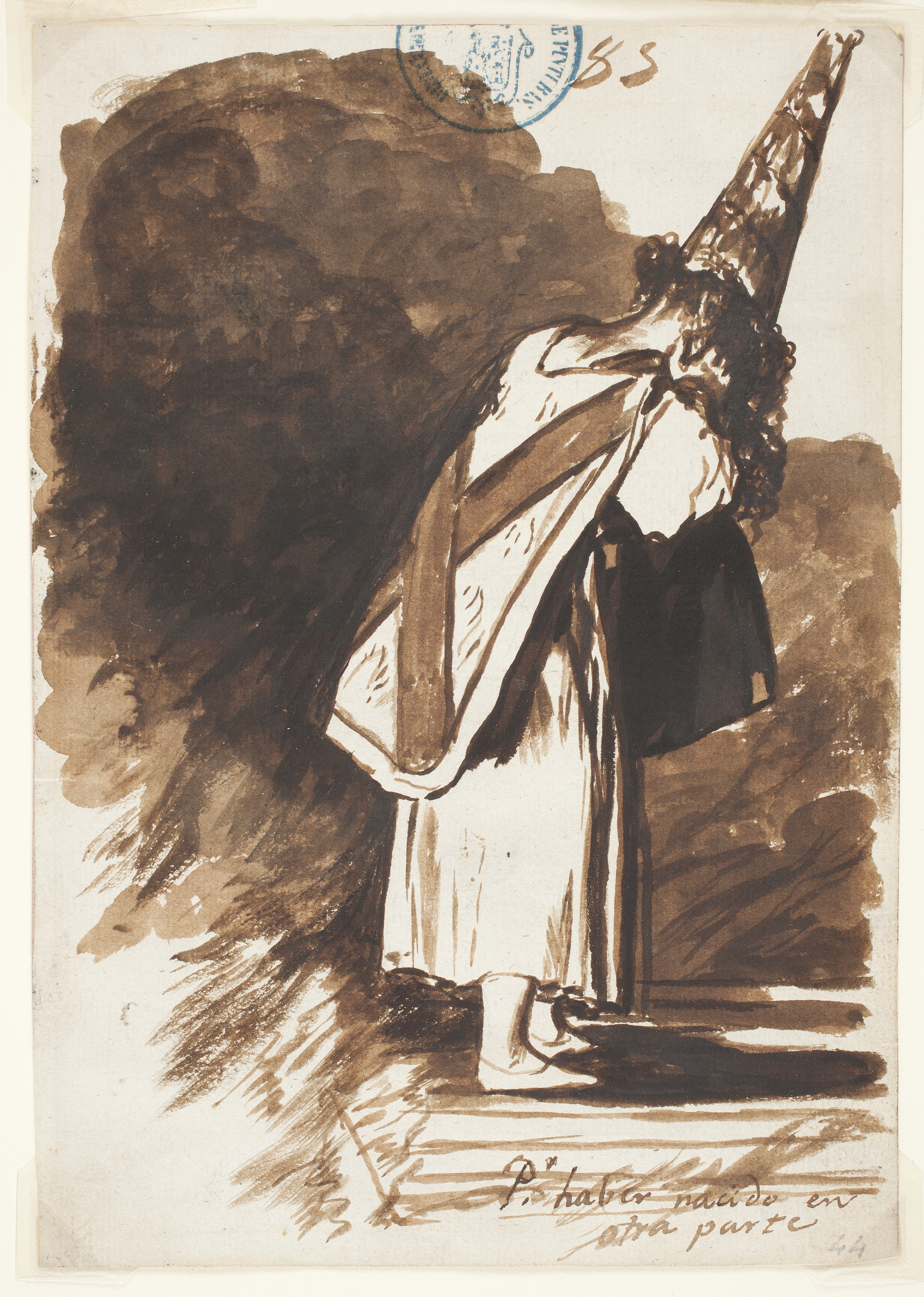
Prisoner condemned by the Inquisition wearing a sanbenito with the Cross of Saint Andrew (Goya).

In 1798, Jovellanos submitted to the king a Memorial on the Nature of the Tribunal of the Inquisition, in whose drafting he made extensive use of Tavira’s text. In it he argued for the urgent need to limit the jurisdiction of the Inquisition and to restore to the bishops their competences in matters of faith and heresy, in line with the episcopalist doctrine championed by Spanish Enlightenment thinkers.

In the Representación, the first reproach Jovellanos levelled at the Inquisition concerned the way it had treated the conversos and its close relationship with the statutes of blood purity):

"From this arose the infamy that cloaked the descendants of these conversos, who were publicly regarded as dishonoured. The laws confirmed this disgrace by approving the estatutos de limpieza de sangre (statutes of blood purity), which excluded so many innocent people not only from positions of honour and trust, but even from entering churches, colleges, monasteries, and even the religious brotherhoods and craft guilds of artisans. From this stemmed the perpetuation of hatred—not only against the Inquisition, but against religion itself."

However, Jovellanos was unable to carry out his project: he was dismissed from office in August 1798 and subsequently confined by royal order in Bellver Castle in Mallorca.

Nevertheless, Mariano Luis de Urquijo, who succeeded Godoy as Secretary of State, revived Jovellanos’s reformist plan and went much further, attempting to impose upon the Spanish Church the model of the constitutional French Church. Indeed, several French bishops led by Abbé Grégoire published a pamphlet entitled Observations on the Reservations of the Church of Spain, in which they called on Spanish bishops to claim “with boldness” their rights against papal reservations and also demanded the abolition of the Inquisition, “a tribunal that dishonours Spain and afflicts its Church”. Urquijo’s first measure was aimed at curtailing papal “reservations” by a decree of 5 September 1799—later known as the Schism of Urquijo—which authorised Spanish bishops to grant matrimonial dispensations that until then could only be issued by the Holy See. His second measure struck directly at the Inquisition. Taking advantage of a dispute caused by the Barcelona tribunal, which had refused permission for the Muslim consul of Morocco and his Jewish secretary to disembark, Urquijo sent a sharply worded letter ordering the tribunal to obey the king’s commands and immediately dismissed all its members.

Urquijo’s reformist project, however, came to nothing: he was removed from office in December 1800 by Charles IV. The king’s decision was heavily influenced by a letter he received from the newly elected Pope Pius VII—quoted by Godoy in his Memoirs in which the pontiff advised him to “close his ears to those who, under the pretext of defending the royal prerogatives, sought only to excite that spirit of independence which, beginning by resisting the gentle yoke of the Church, ends by throwing off every restraint of obedience and submission to temporal governments”. Godoy himself replaced Urquijo at the head of Charles IV’s government with the title of Generalísimo. With regard to the Inquisition, he abandoned the reformist projects of both Jovellanos and Urquijo, although in 1805 he created the Press Tribunal), placing it above the Holy Office in matters of censorship and staffing it with radical Enlightenment figures who were staunchly opposed to the Inquisition.

According to Emilio La Parra and María Ángeles Casado, the reform projects for the Inquisition—and for the Spanish Church in general—ultimately failed primarily because “Charles IV was never willing to confront the Church, still less Rome”, and because the most influential Spanish bishops “were firm supporters of the Holy See and, when the critical moment came, were always prepared to defend the prerogatives of the Roman pontiff above the rights that belonged to them by virtue of their episcopal office”.

== The first abolition: the “Chamartín Decrees” of Napoleon Bonaparte (1808) ==
=== The Inquisition and the “Bayonne Constitution” ===
Napoleon in His Study at the Tuileries Palace, by Jacques-Louis David, 1812.

By virtue of the abdications of Bayonne, the rights of the Spanish Crown passed to Napoleon Bonaparte, who in turn ceded them to his brother Joseph I Bonaparte, but the change of dynasty was not accepted by a large part of the Spanish population. The anti-French revolt that began in Madrid on May 2, 1808, spread throughout the country, with juntas forming that assumed power in the name of the legitimate king, Ferdinand VII, and declared war on the Empire. Meanwhile, Napoleon summoned 150 “notables” to Bayonne to approve the “Constitution” of the new Bonapartist monarchy. Among those who attended was Raimundo Ettenhard y Salinas, senior inquisitor of the Council of the Supreme Inquisition, who had already rendered a first and valuable service to Napoleon by condemning the anti-French revolt in a circular sent to all courts on May 6, 1808, in which he described what had happened on May 2 in Madrid as “scandalous riot by the lower classes” and revolutionary disorder carried out “under the guise of patriotism.” (this statement in favor of the French occupation was of great value because at that time the Council of the Supreme Inquisition was the highest authority of the Inquisition, since the Grand Inquisitor, Ramón José de Arce, had resigned on March 22 and Ferdinand VII had not proposed a replacement because the pope had been unable to accept Arce's resignation as he was outside Rome, a prisoner of Napoleon).

The preliminary draft of the “Constitution of Bayonne” included an article ordered by Napoleon that stated: “The Inquisition is abolished.” However, most of the “notables” willing to support the new Bonapartist monarchy opposed the dissolution of the Inquisition being included in the constitutional text. It was not until Joseph I took the throne and reached an agreement with the ecclesiastical hierarchy, even though all of them were opposed to the Inquisition, such as Mariano Luis de Urquijo, who had also gone to Bayonne. Only the senior inquisitor Ettenhard defended it, arguing that the Inquisition of that time had little to do with the traditional one in terms of procedural guarantees for detainees—he claimed that torture had been abandoned—and in terms of the “lenient” penalties now imposed on them.

Finally, Napoleon decided to accept the suggestion of the notables, and the article referring to the abolition of the Inquisition was deleted. However, Article 98 stated the following:

Justice shall be administered in the name of the king by courts and tribunals established by him. Therefore, courts with special powers and all courts of abbots, orders, and lordships are abolished.

Finally, Napoleon decided to accept the suggestion of the notables, and the article referring to the abolition of the Inquisition was deleted. However, Article 98 stated the following:

"Justice shall be administered in the name of the king by courts and tribunals established by him. Therefore, courts with special powers and all courts of abbots, orders, and lordships are abolished."

Some experts have interpreted this article as implicitly eliminating the Inquisition, since it was not mentioned, but others have denied this because the Inquisition, being a mixed royal and papal court, would not be included in “courts that have special powers.”

=== The Chamartín Decrees ===
However, in the following months Napoleon changed his mind and abolished the Inquisition through the decrees of Chamartín in December 1808. The reason for this was the offensive launched by Spanish “patriots” who did not recognize the abdications of Bayonne and who had inflicted a severe defeat on French troops at the Battle of Bailén (July 19, 1808), forcing King Joseph I Bonaparte to abandon Madrid, where he had arrived just one day after the battle. Napoleon therefore decided to intervene personally in Spain and, at the head of a powerful army, crossed the border in November, occupying Madrid the following month. On December 4, he promulgated the “Chamartín decrees,” which put an end to the Old Regime in Spain with a stroke of the pen. One of these decrees abolished the Inquisition “as an attack on sovereignty and civil authority,” and its assets were transferred to “the Crown of Spain to serve as collateral for the Vales and any other effects of the Monarchy's debt.” According to Emilio La Parra and María Ángeles Casado, the emperor decided to abolish the Inquisition for propaganda reasons—thus presenting himself to the French and all of Europe as the liberator of peoples oppressed by religious fanaticism—and because it no longer served his purposes. “Now that war was a reality... the Inquisition was useless. Its function had ceased to be effective; it was more symbolic (representing the ideal of Catholicism under the Old Regime), but it did not serve to keep the population subjugated to the established sovereign, who, according to Napoleon, could only be his brother Joseph I.”

According to Joseph Pérez, “these radical measures that brought an end to the Old Regime in Spain caught Spanish minorities off guard, as they never imagined things would go so far.”

Immediately after the publication of the decree of abolition in the Gazeta de Madrid on December 11, 1811, all members and staff of the Council of the Supreme Inquisition and other inquisitors were arrested in the capital and forced to hand over all the documents in their possession, especially those relating to the institution's properties. Those who did so were released from prison, while those who did not were sent as prisoners to Bayonne. The courts in the territories under French control were also closed.

On December 16, La Gaceta de Madrid reproduced in French and Spanish the speech Napoleon had addressed to the senior guilds of Madrid, who had presented him with their respects and obedience:

"I have abolished the Tribunal against which the century and Europe were protesting. Priests must guide consciences, but they must not exercise any external and corporal jurisdiction over citizens."

In March 1809, King Joseph I ordered Juan Antonio Llorente, who had participated in attempts to reform the Inquisition during the reign of Charles IV, to gather all the documentation obtained, thanks to which he published in 1812 Memoria histórica sobre qual ha sido la opinión nacional de España acerca del Tribunal de la Inquisición (Historical Memoir on the National Opinion of Spain Regarding the Tribunal of the Inquisition), in which he attempted to demonstrate that the Spanish people had always been opposed to the Inquisition and that the Inquisition had not been founded in accordance with the fundamental laws of the Crown of Castile and the Crown of Aragon. He also published the first volume of Anales de la Inquisición de España (Annals of the Inquisition of Spain), the second volume of which appeared in 1813. Four years later, in exile in Paris, Llorente would publish his seminal work on the Inquisition, which would have an enormous impact: Histoire critique de l'Inquisition d'Espagne. Other works joined Llorente's critical writings. The most widely read was the novel Cornelia Bororquia o La víctima de la Inquisición (Cornelia Bororquia or The Victim of the Inquisition) by Luis Gutiérrez, first published anonymously in Paris in 1801. It stated that “all intolerant religions are false religions.” According to Gérard Dufour, this work “had more influence than Llorente's in the development of popular anticlericalism, of which it would be a constant reference throughout the 19th century.”

However, Llorente's Memoria histórica would be used by liberals during the long debate in the Cortes of Cadiz on the abolition of the Inquisition, although the author's name was never mentioned.

In conclusion, according to La Parra and Casado, “the measures adopted in French-influenced Spain dealt a severe blow to the Inquisition, from which it would never recover. The suppression decreed by the Cortes of Cadiz finished the job.”

== The second abolition: the decree of 28 February 1813 by the Cortes of Cádiz ==
During the Spanish War of Independence in “patriotic” Spain, the courts of the Inquisition continued to function, albeit only in a symbolic capacity, due to the "discredit of the institution because of its obscure role in the uprising against Napoleon, the defection of the former Grand Inquisitor Arce swore allegiance to Joseph I Bonaparte and the condemnation of the uprising by senior officials of the Tribunal." To this must be added “the financial problems created by the difficulty of collecting revenues in wartime, ... the sudden reduction in personnel and the confusion caused by the suppression decreed by Napoleon. Furthermore, the serious problem arising from the absence of the Grand Inquisitor had not been resolved.”

=== Proclamation of “freedom of the press” ===
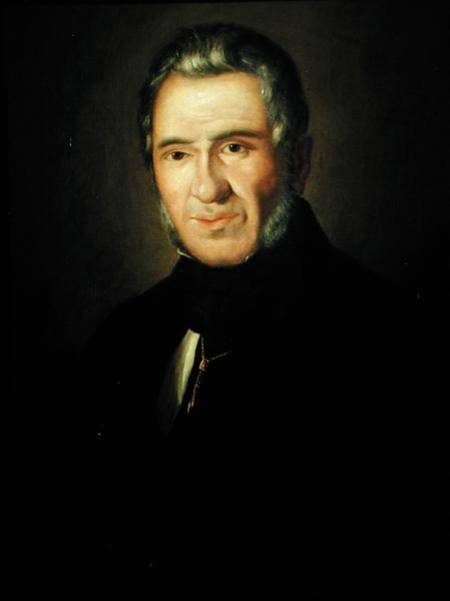
Agustín Argüelles, portrait by Federico Jiménez.

The first “death blow” dealt to the Inquisition was the approval by the Cortes of Cádiz—a few weeks after it had been inaugurated with the declaration that national sovereignty resided therein—of the law on freedom of the press of November 10, 1810. The liberal deputies who proposed it understood that freedom of the press should precede the “reforms proposed by the Cortes” because, as Agustín Argüelles said, “a representative body without the support and guidance of public opinion would soon find itself isolated, soon reduced to its own insights.” Diego Muñoz Torrero understood it as a consequence of the proclamation of national sovereignty, since “the right to scrutinize the acts of government is an inalienable right that no nation should cede without ceasing to be a nation.”

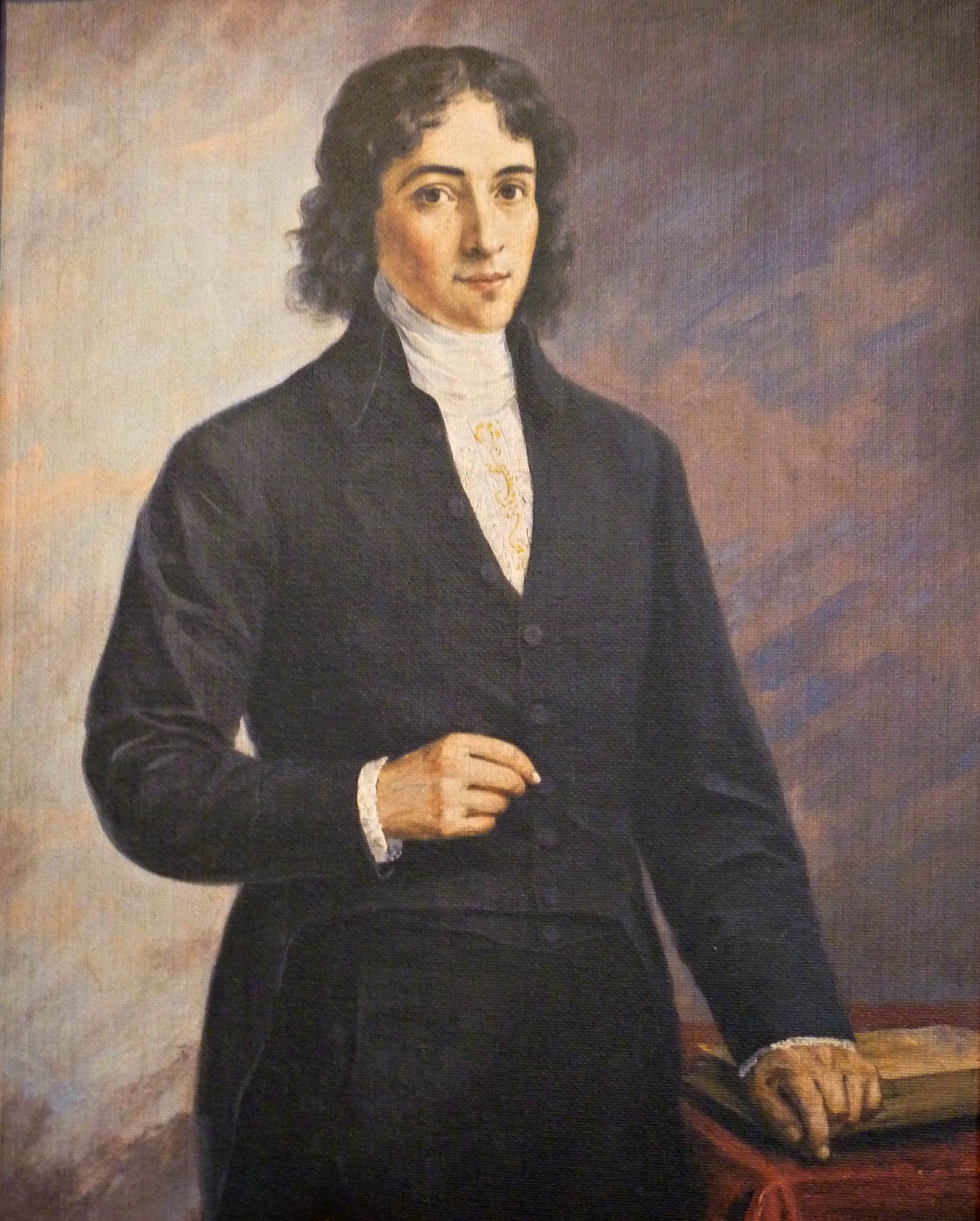
Portrait of José Mejía Lequerica. Unknown artist (18th century AD). Quito DM.

Article 1 declared that all Spaniards “have the freedom to write, print, and publish their political ideas without prior license, revision, or approval.” Since the Inquisition’s primary function had become moral and ideological censorship, this deprived it of its central instrument. Religious writings alone required prior review, under episcopal jurisdiction (Article 6).

The law also created a Censorship Board, displacing the Inquisition from this sphere.

Article 6 has been debated; La Parra and Casado argue that liberals intended it to apply only to writings about Catholic doctrine, not politics or ecclesiastical affairs.

In November 1811, Spanish bishops complained to the Cortes about the wave of “anti-religious” publications that were spreading under the protection of freedom of the press and called for the reinstatement of the Inquisition. In March of the following year, the month in which the Constitution was approved, they again requested that “the scandalous torrent of pernicious opinions that is so widespread in our days be stopped by the most prompt and effective means.” The eight bishops who had taken refuge in Palma de Mallorca—the archbishop of Tarragona and the bishops of Lleida, Tortosa, Barcelona, Urgel, Teruel, Pamplona, and Cartagena—expressed similar sentiments in the representation they sent to the Cortes Generales y Extraordinarias (General and Extraordinary Courts), in which they called for the reinstatement of the Holy Tribunal of the Inquisition in the exercise of its functions. The liberal newspaper Diario Mercantil responded:

"The vote of one, two, three, or three hundred bishops on matters not essential to religion is worth no more than that of sacristans."

=== The decree abolishing the Inquisition ===
"Goya presents the scene of an autillo. Those condemned to death, identified as such by the crowns with upward-pointing flames they wear, listen to the sentence read by a friar from a platform or pulpit. The architecture of the room evokes a building from centuries past, perhaps the seat of an inquisitorial court. The large space is occupied by religious figures from different orders (most notably Franciscans and Dominicans) and a large group of people whose gender and social status are unknown, except for a group of women wearing mantillas seated in a box. In the center, an inquisitor dressed in black and adorned with a cross points to the condemned without looking at them, implying his deep contempt for them."

Once the Constitution of 1812 had been approved, proclaiming Catholicism as the “only true religion” and prohibiting the practice of any other religion, the question arose as to whether the Inquisition had a place within it. To resolve the issue, the Constitutional Commission, chaired by the liberal clergyman Diego Muñoz Torrero, was asked to issue a ruling, which it presented to the Cortes on December 8, 1812. To prepare it, the commission used copious documentation from the Inquisition tribunals of Mallorca and the Canary Islands, the only ones that had not been affected by Napoleon's decree of abolition, as well as the Memoir of Juan Antonio Llorente, although without mentioning him as he was a French sympathizer. The Commission's proposal was that the Inquisition should be abolished and replaced by “Tribunals for the Protection of the Faith” under the authority of the bishops.

This sparked one of the most heated and lengthy debates in the Cortes, with the “liberal” deputies supporting the Commission's ruling on one side and the “servile” deputies—as they were called by their opponents—defending the maintenance of the Holy Office on the other. The debate, which not only discussed the Inquisition but also the political, social, and religious organization of the future and had a major impact on public opinion, involved the most prominent figures from the two groups that had been taking shape in the Cortes since its inception. Among those known as “liberals” were the clergymen Diego Muñoz Torrero, José Espiga, Antonio Oliveros, Antonio José Ruiz de Padrón, Francisco Serra, and Joaquín Lorenzo Villanueva; and the laymen Agustín Argüelles, José Mejía Lequerica, the Count of Toreno, and José María Calatrava. Among the so-called “serviles” were Francisco Javier Borrull, the only layman, and the clergymen Pedro Inguanzo, Simón López García, Alonso Cañedo Vigil (a member of the Commission who did not sign the ruling), Jaime Creus, Blas Ostolaza, Ramón Lázaro Dou, and Francisco Riesco.

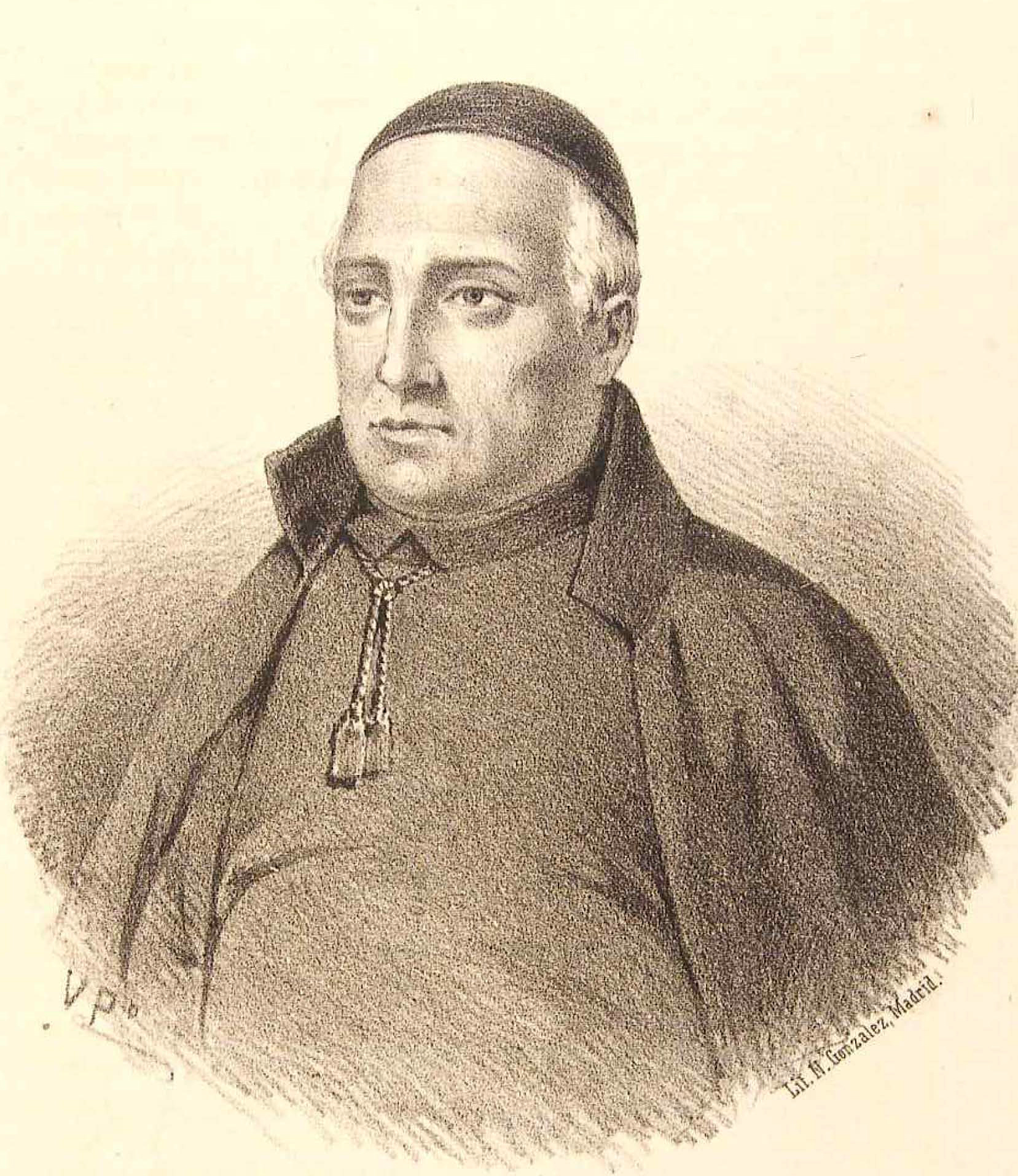
Diego Muñoz Torrero, priest and liberal congressman.

The liberal deputies focused their speeches on demonstrating the incompatibility of the Inquisition with the recently approved Constitution, as it violated three of its fundamental principles: national sovereignty, the separation of powers, and individual rights. To this end, they constructed a historical narrative according to which the Holy Office had exceeded the scope for which it was created (to combat heresy) and had arrogated to itself —particularly the Grand Inquisitor, “Sovereign in the midst of a sovereign nation”— powers and privileges in the service of the ‘despotism’ of the monarchy and the papacy, usurping them from the bishops and violating the spirit of the Gospel, which advocates “unity, peace, gentleness, and charity,” according to Ruiz de Padrón. He had also established procedures contrary to civil and ecclesiastical laws, basic rules of justice, and human rights, among which the following stood out: “denunciations and their consequences (slander, defamation, shame), secrecy, the inability of the accused to defend themselves, the denial of the right to appeal against the court's sentence, the practice of torture, the confiscation of property, the extension of the crime to relatives and even friends of the condemned person...” As Deputy Agustín Argüelles said, in the Inquisition's regulations “all the rules of universal justice are violated.” Manuel García Herreros, for his part, accused the Holy Office of undermining individual security, which is “one of the main objectives of society” and which, for no reason, “however sacred it may be,” can be ignored.

In their defense of the Inquisition, the “servile” deputies, for their part, resorted to the argument that the Cortes were not competent, since it was an ecclesiastical court, whose abolition or continuation was a matter for the pope, and therefore if the Cortes abolished it, they would cause a ‘schism’ by removing “the Church of Spain from the center of unity.” They also claimed that the Inquisition was more necessary than ever at that time due to the spread of “impious” ideas caused by the French occupation and the “pernicious effects” of freedom of the press, which encouraged the dissemination of “philosophical” ideas—that is, ideas contrary to religion— which was also denounced in a pastoral instruction made public on December 12, 1812, by a group of bishops who had taken refuge in Mallorca. Finally, they presented a benevolent view of the Inquisition's procedures, which, according to them, were comparable to those of other courts, such as the use of torture, and ultimately, even if there had been excesses, the defense of religion justified everything As Representative Borrull said:

"The matter is very clear: our main goal must be the preservation of religion, to which all human respects and interests yield."

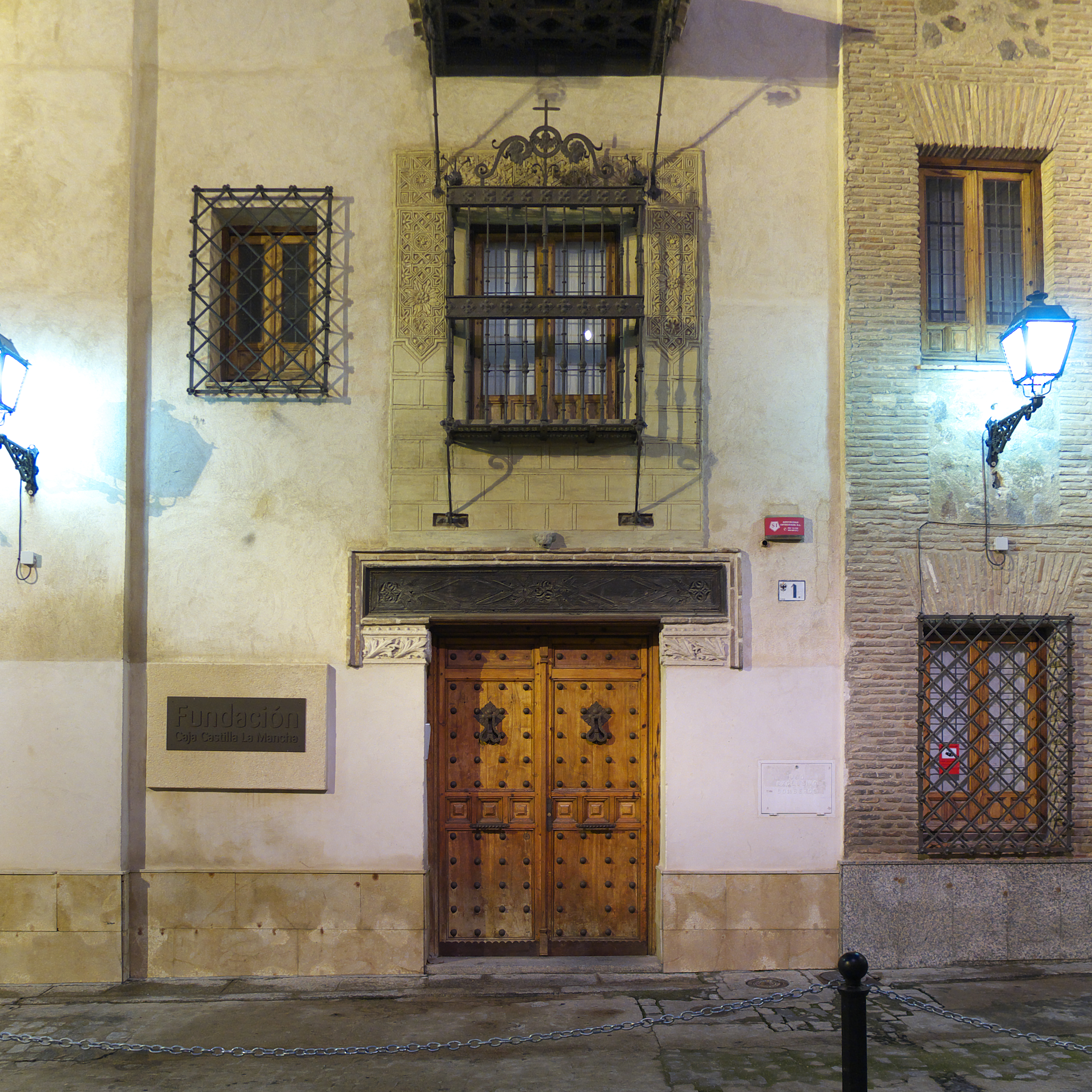
Possible seat of the Inquisition Tribunal of Toledo.

The final vote on the Commission's ruling was summarized in the proposal “The Court of the Inquisition is incompatible with the Constitution,” which was approved on January 22, 1813, by 90 votes in favor and 60 against. A month later, on February 22, Decree No. 223 of the Cortes was published on the abolition of the Inquisition and the establishment of the courts protecting the Faith, which was accompanied by a Manifesto setting out the reasons for the abolition of the Holy Office and which was to be read in all the parishes of the Monarchy during three consecutive Sundays at High Mass. Two other decrees relating to the Inquisition were approved on the same day. One ordered the removal and destruction of “all pictures, paintings, or inscriptions recording the punishments and penalties imposed that exist in churches, cloisters, convents, or any public place.” The other declared the property of the Holy Office to be the property of the nation.

According to Joseph Pérez, the decree abolishing the Inquisition approved by the Cortes of Cádiz “is full of ambiguities” since the Inquisition "is declared outlawed, but the crime of heresy remains and is punished by law; censorship is also maintained. The only difference is that from that moment on, the bishops assumed powers that had previously belonged to the inquisitors. It must be acknowledged that the Chamartín decree [promulgated by Napoleon in December 1808] had a very different meaning."

On the contrary, Emilio La Parra and María Ángeles Casado consider that the decree left texts on politics, including ecclesiastical politics, outside the control of the bishops, since their sphere of competence was reduced to writings “on religion” and their task was limited to “knowing the causes of faith,” that is, exclusively Catholic dogma. Furthermore, the courts protecting the faith “were very different from the defunct Inquisition,” as the inquisitorial prisons and the secrecy of the process disappeared, and the accused was granted “the right to communicate with their relatives, freely appoint a defense attorney, appeal the sentence, and file appeals.” However, these same authors acknowledge that an important element of the Holy Office was retained—anonymous denunciations—which “contradicts liberal ideology.”

=== Reaction to the decree ===
The impact of the abolition of the Inquisition was enormous. Some sectors applauded the measure, as evidenced by the congratulations sent to the Cortes by various organizations and institutions, and as reflected in the following verses, which were widely circulated at the time:

"Here lies forever, travelers,
the black Inquisition, with which, mercilessly,
they burned millions of innocents,
millions of inhuman gluttonous friars."

Others lamented this, as evidenced by numerous articles in the conservative press, and as reflected in this reply to the previous verse:

"Because she knew how to humiliate the “schemers” by issuing very “prudent” decrees, by helping all “believers,” she was banished by fierce “ignoramuses.”

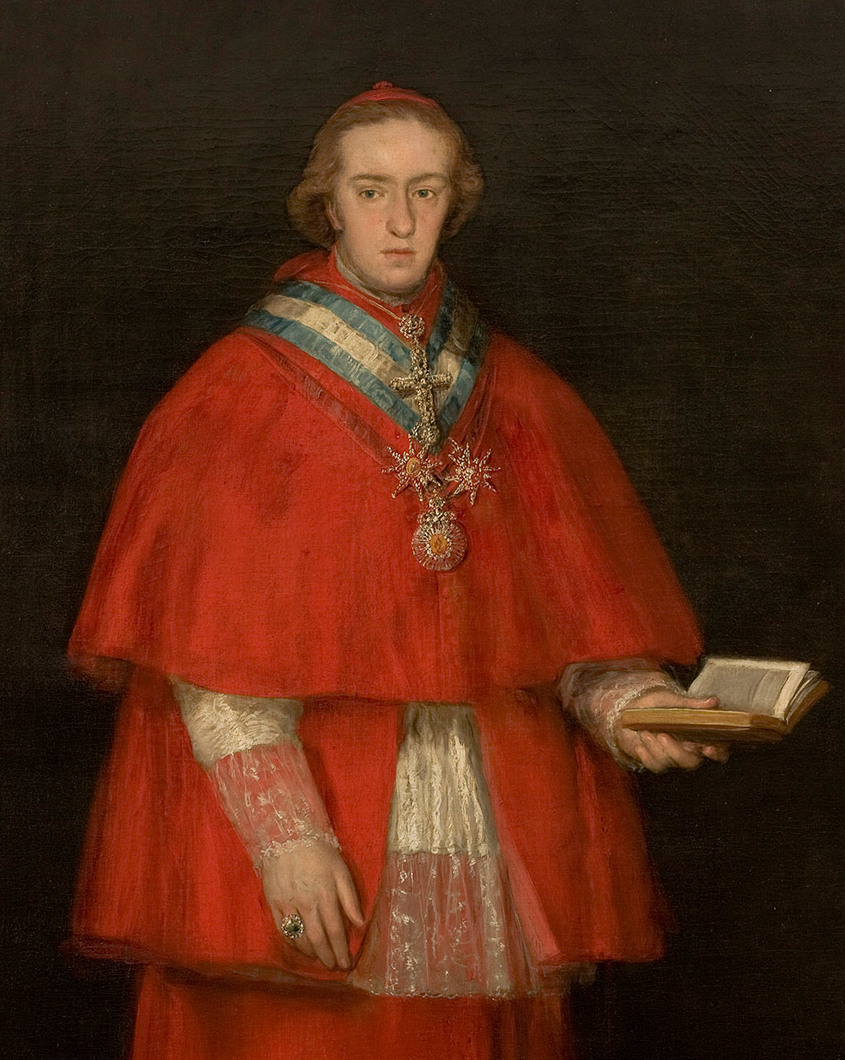
Luis María de Borbón y Vallabriga, Archbishop of Toledo and Regent.

In 1813, the ecclesiastical hierarchy, led by the Holy See's nuncio Pietro Gravina, organized a campaign against the Cortes that revolved around the suppression of the Inquisition but was in fact directed against all the changes approved by the Cortes that had put an end to the Old Regime in Spain. It began immediately after the decree was approved, as on March 5 the nuncio called on parish priests to disobey the order to read the Memoria justifying the abolition of the Inquisition during High Mass on three consecutive Sundays. Because of this proclamation, the nuncio was forced to leave Spain, although he continued to lead the reactionary campaign from Portugal, claiming in the letters he sent to the bishops that a “schism” had occurred in Spain. Proof of the campaign's effectiveness was the fact that in March 1814 there were still dioceses where the decrees had not been published and the Memorandum had not been read, as reported to the Cortes meeting in Madrid by García Herreros, Secretary of State for Grace and Justice. Among the prelates who most strongly supported the pro-Inquisition campaign were the eight bishops who had taken refuge in Palma de Mallorca and the bishops of the north, six of whom—those of Santiago, Orense, Santander, Oviedo, Astorga, and Burgos—fled to Portugal to avoid arrest for refusing to allow the reading in the parishes of their dioceses of the Memoir justifying the abolition of the Inquisition.

A more conciliatory stance was taken by the Archbishop of Toledo and Cardinal Primate Luis María de Borbón y Vallabriga, who was also president of the Regency. In a pastoral letter dated January 3, 1813, a month and a half before the decree of abolition was promulgated, he called for obedience to the government, which “has corroborated in the most solemn manner and with the greatest firmness the existence and prestige of the Catholic religion in Spain.” In June 1813, after sending the pro-Inquisition campaign initiated by the nuncio, Cardinal Borbón sent a letter to all the bishops to try to get them to comply with the rules dictated by the Cortes of Cádiz, although without trying to convince them of the advisability of abolishing the Inquisition. Only 24 of the 59 bishops then in Spain responded, “which did not imply contempt for the cardinal, but rather that a large number of the bishops found themselves in an anomalous situation because of the war, either because their incumbents had fled or because it was not easy for them to reply from an occupied area.” Only two bishops—Manuel Verdugo y Albiturría of the Canary Islands and the bishop of Barbastro—were in favor of abolition, while twelve accepted the decree without enthusiasm or expressed reservations, and ten rejected it more or less openly.

The bishops who opposed the abolition of the Inquisition argued that “the intimate rights of the Church and ecclesiastical freedom” had been violated and lamented “the civil and religious dissensions that unfortunately threaten our homeland.” The bishop of Badajoz called for the “prompt restoration of the Inquisition to the exercise of its functions” in order to contain the “furious flood” of those who want to “live with more freedom and debauchery.” The bishop of Menorca complained that “journalists from Cadiz and elsewhere” had “the power to slander and defame bishops, authorities, and other persons of high dignity, and these do not have the power to defend themselves and to refute and confound them.” The bishop of Salamanca expressed his “discomfort at reading miserable pamphlets in which even the divinity itself is not forgiven, grace is ridiculed, which, if denied, I do not know what the cross of the Lord was for...” distrusting the courts of faith that were to replace the Inquisition, because he considered that they would not be effective “in eradicating the abominable impiety that has spread so widely in recent times.” He concluded: “In a nation that is Catholic by fundamental law, which closes the door to the practice of any other religion, is it reasonable to be lenient with those who seem to boast of having none?” The Bishop of Orihuela said that what distressed him most was “seeing how evil spreads and seeing no remedy applied to stop such damage.”

The bishop of León asked Cardinal Borbón to use his “powerful authority to ensure that matters of religion and its ministers are treated with the decorum they deserve, punishing those who contravene this, for otherwise it is inevitable that religion will die out, as has happened in other kingdoms...” The bishop of Cuenca blamed the French for "the discord and bad seed they have sown... in the space of six years [that the prelate had been absent from his diocese] with their depraved customs and pernicious doctrine and worse examples,“ and asked the Cardinal for ”effective measures to contain the impetuous torrent of evil doctrines and enforce the holy law of God and the precepts of his Church, protecting the authority of the bishops and communicating the strictest orders to the secular authorities and the generals“ so that ”they may enforce and comply with the laws of the Nation and the wise ordinances given to the army in matters of religion and good morals, severely punishing the rebellious, scandalous, and libertines..." The bishop of Sigüenza also asked the cardinal to intervene “so that just as God commands us to work for the good of the State, He also wants us not to touch His anointed ones or slander His prophets.”

For their part, the only two bishops who strongly supported the abolition of the Inquisition justified it by following the episcopal doctrine of the Spanish Enlightenment. Their letters were read publicly in the Cortes and included in the Journal of Sessions. The bishop of the Canary Islands, Manuel Verdugo y Albiturría, wrote that by “annihilating” the Holy Office, the Cortes of Cadiz had done “nothing more than restore to the episcopal dignity its former brilliance and [sic] splendor as natural judges of the faith of their flock,” He then went on to give “the most heartfelt thanks on behalf of my church for having strengthened the ties that bind it to its shepherd and its center and unity, for having dispelled and broken the chains with which ignorance had imprisoned the arts and sciences, and, most importantly, the solid principles of the religion of our Savior.” The bishop of Barbastro, Agustín Abad y Lasierra, went even further in his support for abolition, writing that he found “no reason or solid basis” for the “opposition expressed to the decrees issued by the Cortes” by the nuncio and the bishops who had defended the “preservation” of the Inquisition He then wrote:

"This mixed tribunal, civil and ecclesiastical, requested by the King and approved by the Pope, was considered useful and appropriate when it was established. Today it has been judged unnecessary and incompatible with our new Constitution, and the government has extinguished it, substituting such means as it has deemed suitable for preserving the Catholic religion in its purity. [...]
To act otherwise [by disobeying the decrees of the Cortes] is to worsen our situation, disturb the public order of our society and place ourselves among the factionalists and the disobedient to legitimate authorities, contrary to the precept of the Gospel. [...]
Neither in the regulations nor in the orders issued by the august Congress do I find anything that opposes or impedes the free exercise of our holy religion, of its divine precepts and praiseworthy customs. On the contrary, I am persuaded that all its decrees are, perhaps in the present circumstances, the most suitable for restoring religion to its former glory, for uniting the people with the bonds of Christian charity and for rekindling in our brothers the zeal of the first bishops of the Church, so that, restoring religion in its purity according to the spirit of Jesus Christ, concord and peace among the faithful, they may thereby attain the Christian virtues and beliefs of the pure faith, which is what is to save us."

=== Interpretation of the abolition of the Inquisition by anti-liberal historiography ===
From the Church’s opposition to the abolition of the Inquisition there arose a pro-Inquisition current in historiography—“servile”, as one historian has called it— whose leading representative was Marcelino Menéndez Pelayo in the last third of the 19th century, and which had continuators in the 20th century, especially during the Francoist dictatorship. At present its central thesis, that the abolition was an anti-religious measure, is no longer sustainable, as the most recent research has shown. In 1982 the historian Antonio Álvarez de Morales was already expressing his perplexity at the fact that some authors continued to insist upon it:

"If it is understandable that anti-liberal historiography should have used the abolition of the Inquisition as one more weapon in the political struggle waged against the liberal regime, the persistence of later historiography in this interpretation is not easy to explain, since it ought to have approached the subject with a minimum of objectivity and long since abandoned easy recourse to the alleged Voltaireanism of the liberal deputies, or their Masonic affiliation, or to any other Manichaean explanation. Fortunately, research into many figures from the last third of the 18th century to the Cortes of Cádiz increasingly makes clear their Catholic orthodoxy and the ideological manipulation of which they have been the object; a paradigmatic case is that of the Count of Aranda, branded a Mason by this historiographical current.[...]

The sincere religiosity of the Cádiz deputies is beyond doubt in their concern that the Catholic religion should remain protected by tribunals of faith and by the persecution of anti-religious books. It will not do, as some defenders of the Inquisition have said, to claim that these norms were a dead letter and never put into practice, because these provisions shared the fate of the others approved by the Cortes, namely their repeal by the absolutist reaction. It was precisely those who defended the Inquisition in the Cortes debates who made it impossible to put into practice what had been agreed there. Probably the relatively most recent book to return to the pro-Inquisition thesis—with abundant quotations from Menéndez Pelayo—is the one published in 1975 by the professor of Church history at the University of Navarra, Francisco Martí Gilabert, entitled La abolición de la Inquisición en España.

In the conclusion to the book, after disqualifying those he calls the “enlightened of the 19th century” for “yearning for the ‘freedom’ [quotation marks in the original] of those who went astray with Luther, a sterile freedom of thought detached from what gives even freedom its fruitfulness: its adherence to the truth”, Martí Gilabert asserts that “in the Cortes of Cádiz there appears for the first time in the history of Spain anticlericalism”, whose objective was “to subject religion to the secular tutelage of the state, under the pretext of safeguarding the faith”. He then adds: “And in order to reassure the people, who considered the Inquisition indispensable for safeguarding it, the abolitionists proposed civil courts ‘protecting’ [quotation marks in the original] religion, a presumed source of state interference in the Church.”

A few pages later he writes: “For anti-Christian Enlightenment thinkers the Inquisition was outdated and useless. The idea of heresy as a social evil had in substance been replaced by the state’s religious indifference, even though appearances were still preserved.” As for Freemasonry, Martí Gilabert says that “if at times the influence of Freemasonry has been exaggerated, I do not believe that it can be altogether dismissed either”. Martí Gilabert goes on to maintain that the Cádiz liberals were motivated by a “complex of inferiority”, “the fruit of mimicry of French figures and intellectual currents”, from which there “arose a contempt for Spain’s past, which they deemed irrational, extending even to popular customs”—he gives as an example “their aversion to bullfighting”. “In the correspondence of Spanish intellectuals with foreigners,” he continues, “one frequently observes that they are very much concerned with the praise and criticism coming from beyond our borders.” The book concludes with the following defence of the Inquisition and the subsequent condemnation, “from the canonical point of view”, of the abolition decreed by the Cortes of Cádiz, while at the same time playing down the weight the institution then had:

"The Inquisition, like all institutions, must be judged according to the mentality of the period in which it was born and developed; otherwise it becomes incomprehensible. In short, it was the fruit of a social reality: a profound faith and the consideration of heresy as a public evil. [...] For this reason everyone then agreed that treason against religion should be punished as an enormous crime. No one was surprised by such a procedure. If it is accepted today that those who, by adulterating food or medicines, conspire against public health should be punished, then in those days everyone accepted the punishment of adulterators who conspired against the health and salvation of souls.[...]

From the canonical point of view, what was done in Cádiz—unilaterally abolishing the Holy Office—was a usurpation by a civil tribunal of a matter that was ecclesiastical or mixed. By the decree of 22 February 1813 the death of an institution was officially sanctioned, which, for various reasons, was no longer fulfilling its objectives and which, in a certain sense, was already dead by the end of the 18th century, after having carried out its mission for three centuries.

== Re-establishment of the Inquisition and the third abolition (1814–1820) ==
=== The last years of activity of the Inquisition ===
After his return to Spain in March 1814, Ferdinand VII promulgated a decree dated in Valencia on 4 May 1814 in which he put an end to the liberal revolution of the Cortes of Cádiz. In it he declared the Constitution of 1812 and all the decrees of the Cortes “null, of no value or effect…, as though such acts had never taken place and were removed from the course of time”. Two and a half months after “this display of almost divine power (the king declared what had already occurred to be non-existent)” and in which “it was impossible to express more forcefully the desire for a return to absolute monarchy”, Ferdinand VII signed a decree restoring “the Council of the Inquisition and the other tribunals of the Holy Office to the exercise of their jurisdiction, observing the usages and ordinances according to which it was governed in the year 1808”. The re-establishment of the Inquisition was justified in the decree as follows:

"The Inquisition is the most effective means of preserving my subjects from internal divisions and ensuring that they live in peace and tranquillity; consequently, I deem it most opportune, in the present circumstances, to restore its jurisdiction to the tribunal of the Holy Office.|

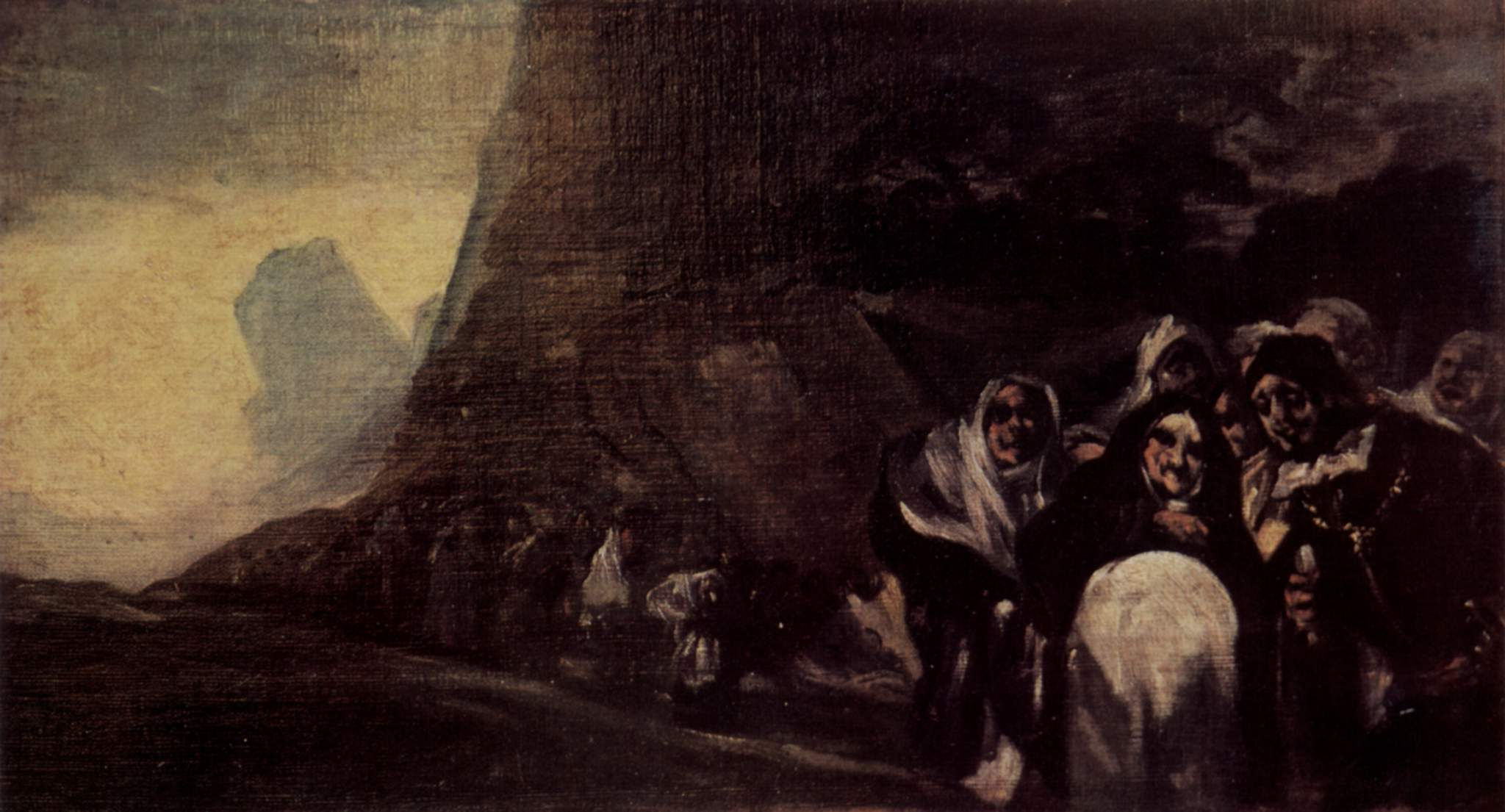
“Procession of the Holy Office”, one of the Black Paintings by Francisco de Goya.

The re-establishment of the Inquisition was completed in September 1814 with the appointment of Francisco Javier de Mier y Campillo, bishop of Almería, as new inquisitor general, a clergyman loyal both to Rome and to the king. Mier published an edict of faith on 5 April 1815 in which he affirmed that he was not going to begin his task “with fire and sword” and promised free absolution for persons who, before the end of the year, denounced themselves and informed on others who had fallen into the same error. “Everything seems to indicate that the Inquisition did not now act with the severity of former times. Almost all those who accused themselves of some offence, even when it involved propositions that had once been classified as injurious to religion, were acquitted or simply admonished or required to perform relatively mild spiritual penances. In many cases no sentence was pronounced… because it was considered necessary to gather further evidence, or because the informer was viewed as suspect or given little credibility.” For example, “in 1817 Lorenzo Ayllón was tried in Seville for insulting a priest while he was saying mass and attempting to snatch the Host from him. In earlier times this individual would have gone to the stake, but now he was acquitted ad cautelam and sentenced to two years’ imprisonment, followed by six months of banishment.” Nevertheless, “the Inquisition continued to be an object of fear for a large part of the population. Proof of this is that denunciations and voluntary statements of self-accusation did not cease in those years” and “the provincial tribunals maintained their activity”.

However, the Inquisition did not show the same moderation when it came to punishing Freemasons. One of Mier y Campillo’s obsessions was Freemasonry, which he condemned in two edicts published at the beginning of 1815, following the Holy See’s directives. He accused Freemasons of conspiring “not only against thrones, but even more against religion” and urged the population to denounce them, guaranteeing secrecy. Many denunciations were made, some of them false, as well as self-accusations, which led to the closure of lodges and to confiscation of their property. Foreign Freemasons were expelled from Spain, and Spaniards were obliged to perform spiritual exercises. There were, however, Freemasons who did not receive such lenient treatment, as happened to the liberal officer Juan van Halen, who in 1817 was tortured for two days after being arrested by the Inquisition. Van Halen himself recounted his experience ten years later, and Pío Baroja dealt with his case in Juan van Halen, el oficial aventurero (“Juan van Halen, the adventurous officer”).

Nor did the Inquisition show leniency towards liberals. In 1817 the liberal scientist Casiano de Prado was arrested by the Spanish Inquisition, accused of “propositions” (expressing ideas contrary to the Catholic religion) and of frequently reading prohibited books. He spent 400 days confined and held incommunicado in the secret prisons of the Inquisition in Santiago de Compostela. He was not even allowed to contact his mother, nor was he permitted to read books on the natural sciences, “and if I requested any favour in that regard, I was treated as a criminal”, as he himself declared in an article published three years later during the Trienio Liberal Francisco de Goya had to appear before the Inquisition tribunal in March 1815 to confirm that he was the author of the paintings La maja vestida and La maja desnuda and to state with what intention he had painted them.

On 20 May 1818 the inquisitor general Mier y Campillo died and was replaced in the post by the bishop of Tarazona, Jerónimo Castillón y Salas, who would be the last inquisitor general, because after the success of the Riego uprising and the restoration of the Constitution of 1812 in March 1820, the Inquisition was abolished and would never be restored.

=== The abolition of the Inquisition ===
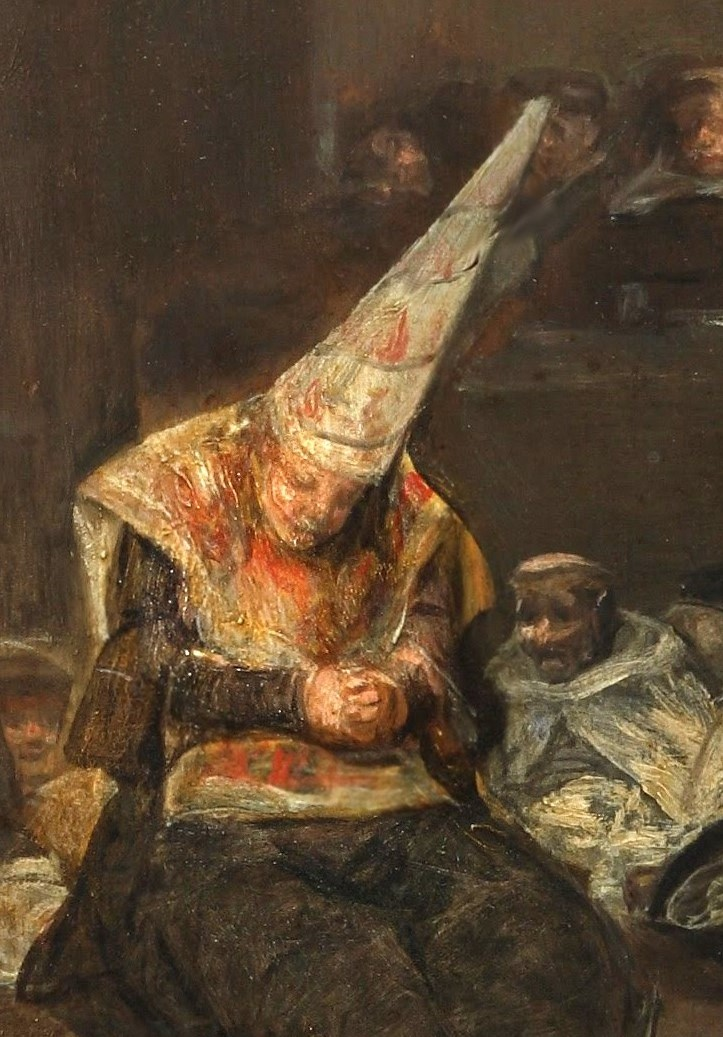
A man condemned by the Spanish Inquisition wearing a sambenito and a coroza at an auto-da-fé (Goya).

On 8 March 1820 the decree restoring the Constitution of 1812 was published in the Gaceta de Madrid—“I have decided to swear the Constitution promulgated by the general and extraordinary Cortes in the year 1812”, declared the king—together with the order that “all those who are imprisoned or detained anywhere in the realm for political opinions” be released. Groups of people immediately hastened to free them, but they did not head for the royal prisons, only for those of the Inquisition. In Madrid, according to one newspaper, “seven individuals who had groaned in those gloomy dungeons saw the light of day and breathed the air of liberty”. Mesonero Romanos, less solemnly, describes with a certain irony the meagre outcome obtained by those who set out to free the prisoners whom they supposed to be undergoing torment in the inquisitorial prison in Madrid, finding there “not a living soul nor a dying body”, except for the French priest Luis Ducós, rector of the Hospital of Saint Louis of the French, an ardent absolutist and author of works such as Historia cierta de la secta de los franc-masones and Historia del judío errante, dedicated to Infante Carlos María Isidro de Borbón.

Only one day later, on 9 March 1820, the king promulgated the decree suppressing the Inquisition and the Supreme Council that governed it, transferring cases of heresy to the jurisdiction of the bishops, as had been done by the decree of the Cortes of Cádiz in 1813, although without establishing any “Tribunals for the protection of the faith”. Thus the last act performed by the Suprema was the confirmation, on 10 February 1820, of the sentence of fifteen days of spiritual exercises in a convent, imposed by the Tribunal of Toledo on the parish priest of Torrejón del Rey, accused of “offences of propositions and of spreading religious doctrines contrary to the views of the Church.”

On 10 March mobs stormed the Inquisition palaces in Valencia, Seville, Barcelona and Palma de Mallorca (in the last of these cities it was bishop Pedro González Vallejo himself who went, together with a captain and a judge, to close the Inquisition tribunal; the files and prohibited books were passed from hand to hand in the cafés and salons of Palma). The same had occurred the day before in Zaragoza, and the only prisoner in the inquisitorial prison was freed by order of the Junta of Aragon. According to Francisco Javier Ramón Solans, the storming of the Inquisition prisons played the same symbolic role in the annihilation of despotism as the Storming of the Bastille in the French Revolution, for, like the royal prison in Paris, “the Inquisition embodied the intolerance, arbitrariness and violence of the Ancien Régime”. In many places the assaults were followed by “masquerades and processions with donkeys dressed in black representing inquisitors”. Plays were also staged, such as La Inquisición, in which Rafael del Riego himself, the “hero of Las Cabezas de San Juan”, appeared freeing a prisoner from the Holy Office’s jail.

Those who stormed the seats of the Inquisition tribunals, with the tolerance of the authorities, did not limit themselves to freeing the prisoners but entered the archives, where they seized documents and prohibited books, though without any violence against persons. According to Emilio La Parra and María Ángeles Casado, “given the secrecy surrounding the Inquisition and the stain it cast on the honour of the families of the condemned, it was to be expected that the population would be eager to know what the terrible tribunal kept.” “These acts were also an outburst of resentment accumulated over so long against a tribunal hated by many and feared by all. Nor can we rule out a certain dose of desacralising reaction… The population, at last, could burst into the very heart of the repressive institution, into a space that had for centuries been closed to it, a sacred place.”

The 1820 decree, unlike that of the Cortes of Cádiz in 1813, was generally well received. This was perceived by the apostolic nuncio Giacomo Giustiniani, who did not oppose the measure—“to insist on embarking upon” a defence of the Inquisition would have resulted in “loss of prestige for the Holy See and, therefore, for religion”, he wrote—, although for two reasons that were more important to him. First, the Inquisition restored in 1814 had neglected its fundamental objective by devoting itself above all to persecution of political dissidents—becoming, in his own words, a “political Inquisition of the state”—and second, it had acted without following the Pope’s guidelines, for example by “censoring or accusing as heretical works that were perfectly orthodox”.

In his dispatch of 17 March 1820 to Rome, Giustiniani wrote:

"On the other hand, I, having had the opportunity to get to know at close hand the organisation and system of this tribunal in Spain, must briefly admit that neither one nor the other was particularly admirable, and that in our days it had become nothing more than a political Inquisition of the state, very different from what it ought to have been… In fact, some time ago I made certain observations to the Grand Inquisitor, pointing out to him how necessary it was to moderate certain external formalities in keeping with the passage of time and, above all, that he should completely abstain from political activity. Giustiniani concluded: “The abolition of the Holy Office therefore does not, at least apparently, for the moment compromise the purity of the Catholic faith.” The nuncio did not oppose the decree of 20 March 1820 either, which declared the assets of the Holy Office to be the property of the nation and earmarked them for payment of the public debt.

Rome approved the nuncio’s policy and a commission set up for the purpose determined that “there is no cause to regret the non-existence of the Inquisition in Spain, because it had greatly degenerated from its purpose, serving above all political ends and showing itself on every occasion to be opposed to the Holy See”. In keeping with this position, the Spanish bishops did not lodge any protest against the decree abolishing the Inquisition, reacting in a very different way from that of 1813. Nor did the inquisitor general himself, Jerónimo Castillón y Salas, oppose it; he left Madrid and returned with his subordinates to his episcopal see, Tarazona.

According to Francisco Javier Ramón Solans, the bishops did not protest because the order came from the king and had been endorsed by the Pope, but also because abolishing the Inquisition strengthened their power by removing an ecclesiastical jurisdiction from their dioceses, and because they themselves assumed the Holy Office’s function of censoring religious writings under the press law approved by the Cortes of Cádiz. In fact, some prelates hastened to issue edicts renewing the prohibitions on books condemned by the Inquisition and by the Holy See.

The cardinal archbishop of Toledo, Luis María de Borbón y Vallabriga, was called upon by the liberals to preside over the Provisional Consultative Junta on ecclesiastical affairs, and, as in 1813, he sent a letter to all the bishops concerning the formation of diocesan censorship boards that were to deal with matters of faith, seeking to reconcile “the interests of religion with freedom of the press and the personal freedom of citizens”. Over the course of January 1821, 40 of the 59 bishops in Spain replied. Most accepted the measures with greater or lesser resignation, a minority supported them—the bishop of Sigüenza praised the “rules established to preserve in the Christian people the purity of dogmas, the sanctity of customs and the uniformity of ecclesiastical discipline”—and a somewhat larger minority rejected them—four bishops, those of León, Valencia, Orihuela and Oviedo, were expelled by order of the government; two others, those of Lérida and Zaragoza, were exiled or confined; and one, the bishop of Pamplona, who requested that the Inquisition be restored “even if its name were changed”, went voluntarily into exile in France—or, while accepting them, acted rigorously in the censorship they exercised on their own initiative, in order to “oppose the flood of evils that threaten our beloved Spain”, as the bishop of Ceuta wrote, and complaining, as did the bishop of Teruel, that “any citizen, whatever his class or station, enjoys more personal consideration than any ecclesiastic”, and warning, like the bishop of Lugo, of “the spiritual harm that ignorance or malice might cause [the faithful] owing to the absence of the tribunal that formerly dealt with cases of faith”—the bishop of Osma acted as though the Inquisition had not been suppressed, renewing “the same prohibitions under the same spiritual penalties”, and congratulated himself that in his diocese “no periodical has been published”.

Acceptance of the abolition of the Inquisition did not mean that the papacy, the nuncio and the Spanish bishops embraced the principles of liberalism, such as freedom of the press, for, as the bishop of Segovia said, “notwithstanding the prohibition of the Holy Office of the Inquisition… the bans on reading and keeping books whose unsound doctrine emanated from that tribunal remain in full force and effect”.

== The “Juntas de Fe” and the fourth and final abolition (1823–1834) ==
=== The decision not to restore the Inquisition ===
On 1 October 1823 King Ferdinand VII was “liberated” by the army of the Hundred Thousand Sons of Saint Louis sent by the Holy Alliance to restore absolute monarchy in Spain for the second time. As the king himself recorded in his diary, on that day “I recovered my freedom and regained the plenitude of my rights which had been usurped by a faction.” But when on that same day he promulgated the decrees annulling all the provisions and acts of the Liberal Triennium, he made no mention of restoring the Inquisition, nor were any orders issued for the inquisitor general to come to court, nor was the Council of the Supreme Inquisition reconstituted.

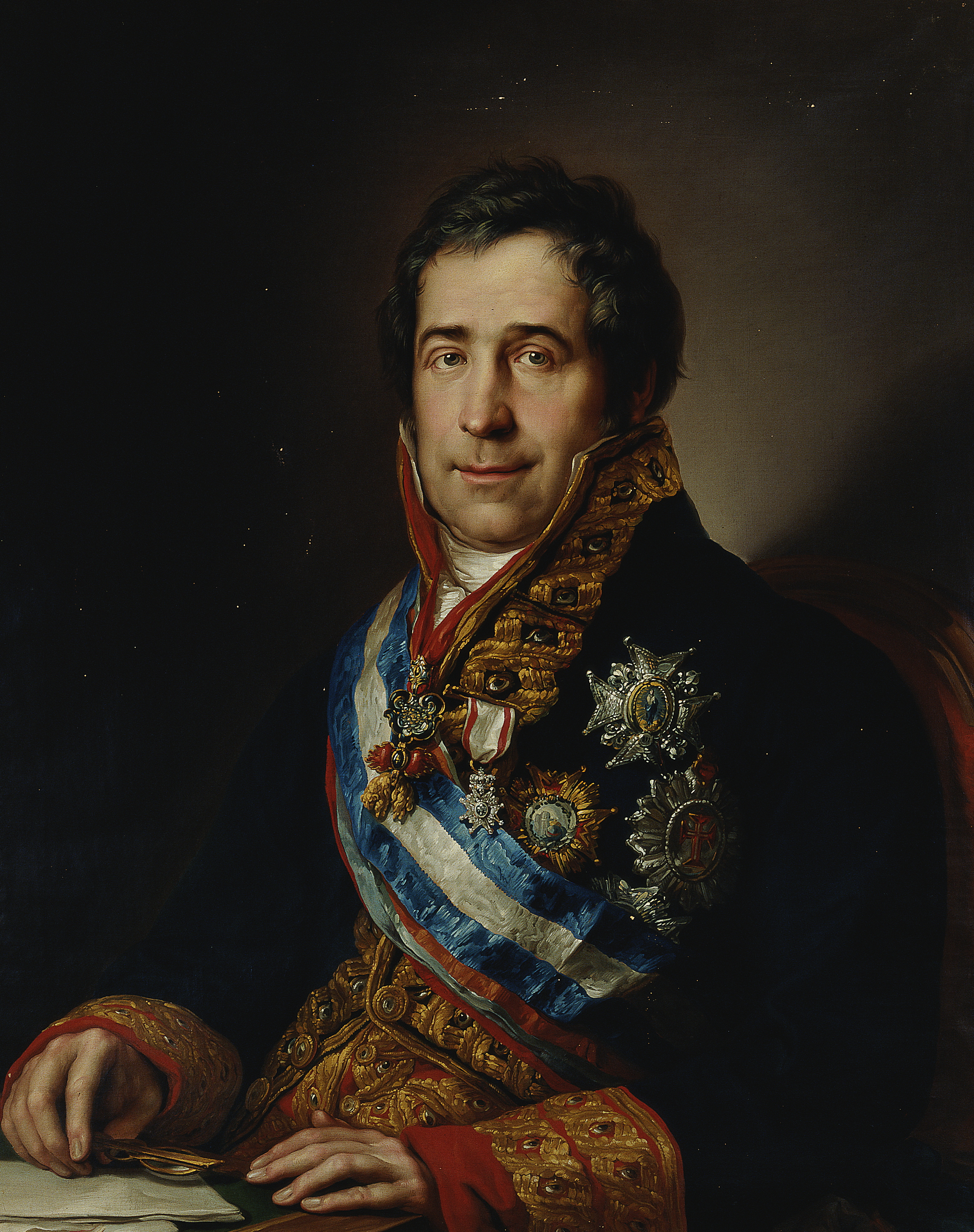
Portrait of Francisco Tadeo Calomarde, by Luis de la Cruz y Ríos (after Vicente López), Secretary of State for Grace and Justice under Ferdinand VII.

Ferdinand VII’s decision not to restore the Inquisition was due to two factors. The first was pressure from the powers of the Holy Alliance. The Duke of Angoulême, commander-in-chief of the Hundred Thousand Sons of Saint Louis, had received explicit instructions from the government of Louis XVIII to prevent the return of the Inquisition, for, as the French foreign minister Chateaubriand wrote in a letter to the French ambassador in Saint Petersburg, “we shall not allow our victories to be stained by proscriptions, nor the bonfires of the Inquisition to be the altars raised to our triumphs”. The Holy Alliance, which had “rescued” Ferdinand VII, was not prepared to see the return of a tribunal that represented religious intolerance and was completely discredited in European public opinion.

The second factor was Ferdinand VII’s plan to reinforce his personal power by surrounding himself with a bloc of unconditional supporters—“moderate royalists”, or better “Ferdinandist royalists”—who did not belong to the ultra-absolutist sector that had emerged during the Triennium. The Inquisition was likely to become one of the bastions of that ultra sector, whose slogan was precisely “Long live the absolute king and the Inquisition”, and so it was not in the king’s interest to restore it. Moreover, to crush the liberals—his real concern, rather than the religious unity of Spain—he did not need the Inquisition, since he had at his disposal a more effective and more loyal instrument: the Superintendencia General de Policía, created in October 1823 under the name “Superintendence of Public Vigilance” and given its definitive name in January 1824, under the authority of the Secretariat of State for Grace and Justice, headed until the end of the reign by Francisco Tadeo Calomarde, a loyal servant of Ferdinand VII. He also had the military commissions, which were likewise charged with monitoring supporters “of the Constitution promulgated in Cádiz”, and the Purification Boards (Juntas de Purificaciones), whose mission was to purge liberals from the administration.

=== The “Juntas de Fe” ===
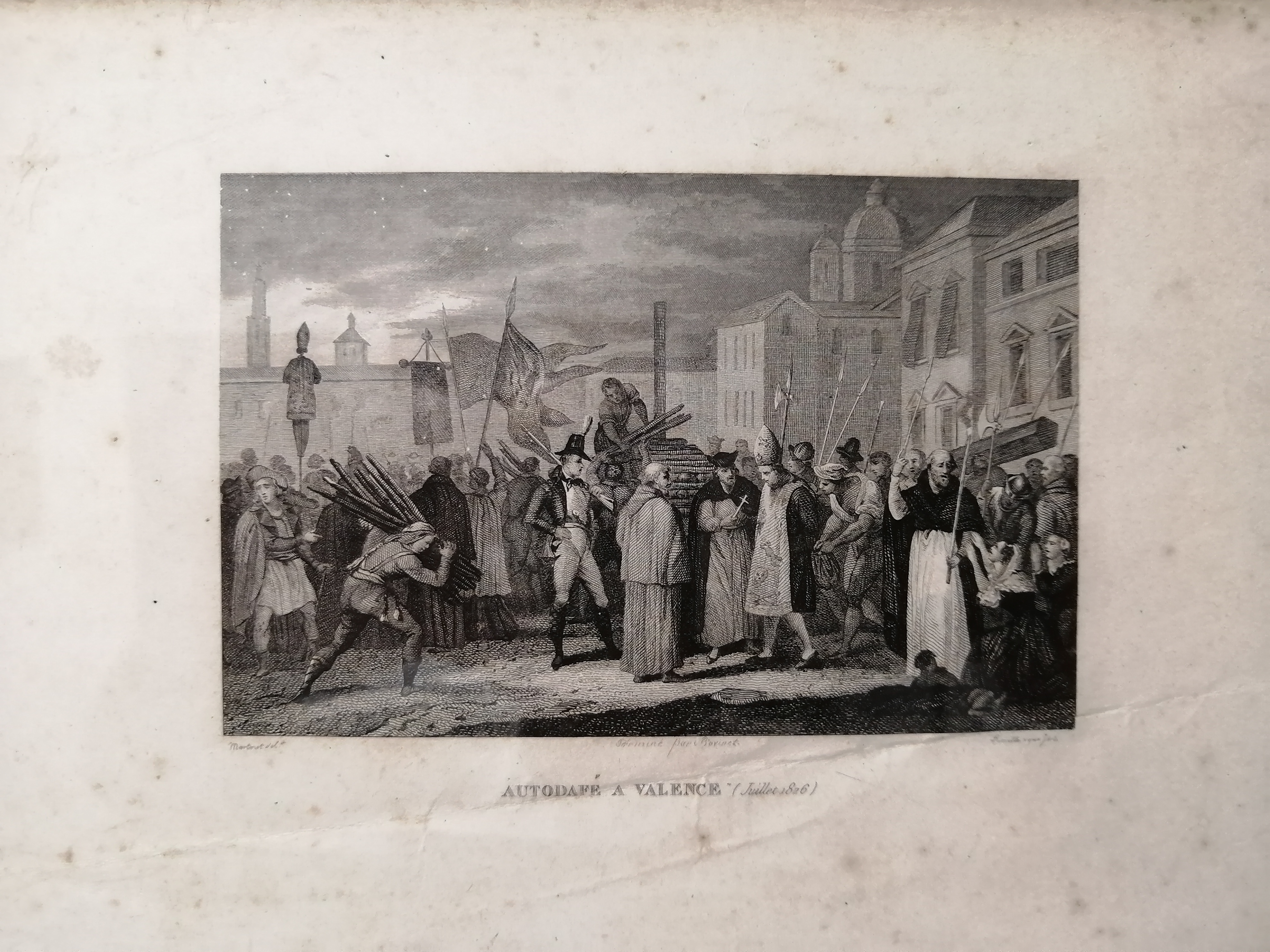
Engraving entitled “Autodafé a Valence (Juillet 1826)” (Auto-da-fé in Valence, July 1826), supposedly depicting the execution for heresy of the Valencian teacher Cayetano Ripoll, but in reality representing an auto-da-fé of the Inquisition (the condemned man is wearing a sambenito and is about to be burned at the stake). Ripoll was hanged by order of the Faith Council of the diocese of Valencia and his body was only “burned” symbolically. Ripoll's execution took place in Valencia's Market Square, and the buildings, which are probably invented, that appear in the engraving are not those of that central square in the city.

From the entry into Spain of the Hundred Thousand Sons of Saint Louis in April 1823, most of the bishops and clergy, as well as military men, Royalist Volunteers, various provincial and local institutions and even universities, had mounted an intense campaign calling for the restoration of the Inquisition, in which the last inquisitor general, Jerónimo Castillón y Salas, also took part. In the newspaper El Restaurador, edited by friar Manuel Martínez Ferro, it was said of the Holy Office: “They say it burned [people], and what farmer does not burn bad weeds to eradicate them?” In 1825 most bishops reaffirmed their view that the Inquisition, and not the police, was the only means “of preserving the purity of religion”, “uprooting the perverse tares of error and immorality”, “uncovering Freemasonry and the enemies of the Altar and the Throne”, and “containing the plague of books, freedoms and shamelessness that stain everything”. The newly created Council of State also pronounced itself in favour of restoring the Inquisition, as the Council of Castile had done earlier.

As the Inquisition was not restored, some bishops took the initiative of creating Juntas de Fe. These were diocesan ecclesiastical tribunals that sought to resemble the Inquisition and were able to function thanks to the complicity of local civil authorities, since they had no legal backing. Their objectives were “defence of the altar and the throne, the maintenance of the country’s religious unity and the safeguarding of traditional values”. The first Junta de Fe, and the most active, was that of the diocese of Valencia, which became notorious throughout Europe for condemning Cayetano Ripoll, the last person to be executed in Spain for the so-called crime of heresy.

Following the example of Valencia, Juntas de Fe were created in two other dioceses, Tarragona, on the initiative of the ultra-royalist archbishop Jaime Creus, and Orihuela. But the government reacted by ordering them “to cease functioning” because they lacked the king’s approval although the tribunal of the Faith in Valencia, even after the scandal provoked in Europe by the execution of Cayetano Ripoll, continued its activity thanks to the tolerance of the minister of Grace and Justice, Tadeo Calomarde. For his part, the nuncio Giacomo Giustiniani pursued his project of establishing, on the basis of the Juntas de Fe, a body—called the “Junta Superior de Fe” (Supreme Junta of the Faith)—similar to the Inquisition, although “without using names that arouse prejudice or inspire terror”, with the purpose “of preserving intact the deposit of the Catholic faith and of inquiring into all who attack it”. Although this body was never created, the bishops continued to exercise censorship of writings and to issue sentences in cases involving matters of faith, which could be appealed to the tribunal of the Rota of the apostolic nunciature in Madrid, something that was endorsed by the king in a law of 6 February 1830.

=== The final abolition of the Inquisition ===
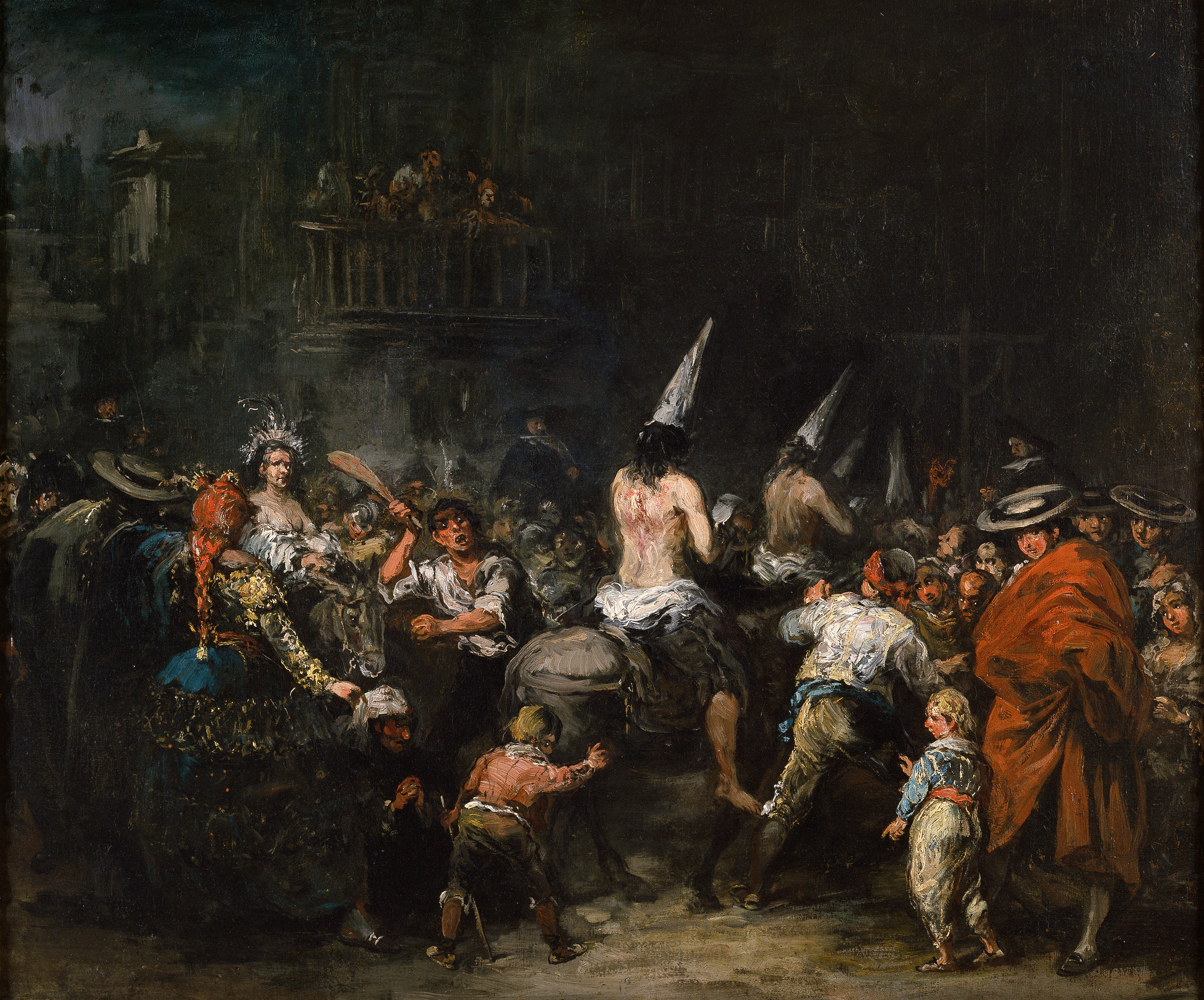
“Condenados por la Inquisición” (“Condemned by the Inquisition”), by Eugenio Lucas (19th century, Prado Museum). “The Inquisition generally condemned the guilty ‘to be flogged while being paraded through the streets’, in which case (if he was a man) he had to appear naked to the waist, often mounted on a donkey so that he would suffer greater humiliation, being duly whipped by the executioner with the prescribed number of lashes. During this procession through the streets, passers-by and children expressed their hatred of heresy by throwing stones at the victim.”

The support given by ultra-royalist sectors to Carlos María Isidro de Borbón in his claim to the Spanish crown after the death of his brother Ferdinand VII on 29 September 1833, which triggered the First Carlist War, forced the regent María Cristina de Borbón, widow of Ferdinand VII, to seek the support of moderate liberals in order to defend the throne of her three-year-old daughter Isabella. In this context, in which the Carlists shouted “Long live Carlos V, long live religion, long live the Inquisition, death to the police”, the government of the moderate liberal Francisco Martínez de la Rosa promulgated the decree of 15 July 1834 definitively suppressing the Spanish Inquisition, which had been drafted by the minister of Grace and Justice Nicolás María Garelli and which the regent María Cristina signed without raising any objections.

It has been argued that the decree was unnecessary because the Inquisition had already been abolished fourteen years earlier, and therefore that it was a “mere political gesture”. On this point Emilio La Parra and María Ángeles Casado write: "It should be borne in mind, however, that in 1834, in the midst of the First Carlist War—a war that was being fought on many fronts, not only the military—the Inquisition still wielded considerable force among Don Carlos’s followers (the so-called apostólicos or “apostolics”, the fervent royalists of earlier years). In the first months of María Cristina’s regency, as in the final decade of Ferdinand VII’s reign, the Carlists defended it and sought to restore it. The liberals regarded it as a phantom of the past. […] It was therefore not unreasonable… that moderate liberal politicians should regard it as necessary to issue a decree definitively abolishing the Inquisition. Among other reasons—and perhaps not the least—because this formality was very useful to them, since in the eyes of the majority it marked their differences from the Carlists [who called for the restoration of the Inquisition, even though Don Carlos did not restore it in the territory under his control]."

The Gaceta de Madrid published the decree of abolition on 17 July 1834. That same afternoon, an anti-clerical riot broke out in Madrid, a city then ravaged by cholera, whose participants held religious orders such as Franciscans, Dominicans and Jesuits—orders that had so often collaborated with the Inquisition throughout its history—responsible for the epidemic. The result was the massacre of friars in Madrid in 1834—more than seventy religious were killed.

On 1 July 1835 the diocesan Juntas de Fe were abolished, since, according to the decree, “they were so many inquisitorial tribunals, charged with hearing every offence that had formerly fallen within the jurisdiction of the now extinct Inquisition, punishing it with spiritual and even corporal penalties, and shrouding their work in the most inviolable secrecy”.

In 1836 Mariano José de Larra wrote the epitaph of the Inquisition:

"Here lies the Inquisition, daughter of faith and fanaticism; she died of old age."

== See also ==
- Black Legend of the Spanish Inquisition

== Bibliography ==
- Álvarez de Morales, Antonio (1982). Inquisición e Ilustración (1700-1834). Madrid: Fundación Universitaria Española. ISBN 84-7392-206-9.
- Dufour, Gérard (2003). "Napoleón puso el epitafio". La Aventura de la Historia (62): 73-79.
- Higueruela del Pino, Leandro (1980). "Actitud del episcopado español ante los decretos de supresión de la Inquisición: 1813 y 1820". En Joaquín Pérez Villanueva, ed. La Inquisición española. Nueva visión, nuevos horizontes. Madrid: Siglo XXI. ISBN 84-323-0395-X.
- Kamen, Henry (2011) [1999]. La Inquisición Española. Una revisión histórica (3ª edición). Barcelona: Crítica. ISBN 978-84-9892-198-4.
- La Parra López, Emilio; Casado, María Ángeles (2013). La Inquisición en España. Agonía y abolición. Madrid: Los Libros de la Catarata. ISBN 978-84-8319-793-6.
- Martí Gilabert, Francisco (1975). La abolición de la Inquisición en España. Pamplona: Ediciones Universidad de Navarra S.A. ISBN 84-313-0369-7.
- Pérez, Joseph (2012) [2009]. Breve Historia de la Inquisición en España. Barcelona: Crítica. ISBN 978-84-08-00695-4.
- Ramón Solans, Francisco Javier (2020). "Religión". En Pedro Rújula e Ivana Frasquet, ed. El Trienio Liberal (1820-1823). Una mirada política. Granada: Comares. pp. 355-377. ISBN 978-84-9045-976-8.
