= Ramón José de Arce =

Grand Inquisitor of Spain (1757 – 1844)

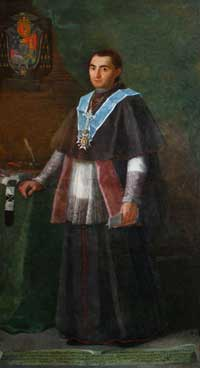
Ramón José de Arce

Ramón José de Arce y Rebollar (1757 – 1844) was a Spanish churchman who served as Archbishop of Burgos from 1797 to 1801; as Grand Inquisitor of the Spanish Inquisition from 1797 to 1808; as Archbishop of Zaragoza from 1800 to 1816; and as Patriarch of the West Indies from 1806 to 1815.

== Biography ==
Ramón José de Arce was born in Selaya, Cantabria in 1757. He was educated at the Colegio Mayor de Cuenca of the University of Salamanca. After university he became an official in the Finance Ministry of the Real Junta de Juros. He then became a member of the Council of Castile.

He was appointed Archbishop of Burgos on December 18, 1797, and was appointed Grand Inquisitor of the Spanish Inquisition at the same time. He was consecrated as a bishop on March 4, 1798. He was translated to the Archbishopric of Zaragoza on July 20, 1801. He was appointed Patriarch of the West Indies on August 26, 1806.

Spain was invaded by the First French Empire in 1808, becoming a client state of the French Empire. A series of sermons that Arce delivered during the occupation were widely believed to be pro-French. As such, after Spain regained its independence during the Peninsular War in 1814, there was pressure on Arce to resign. He resigned his archbishopric and patriarchate on July 15, 1816. He subsequently lived in exile in Paris, where he died on February 16, 1844.

== See also ==
- Catholic Church in Spain

Catholic Church titles
Preceded by Juan Antonio de los Tucros	Archbishop of Burgos; 1797–1801	Succeeded by Manuel Cid y Monroy
Preceded by Francisco Antonio de Lorenzana	Grand Inquisitor of Spain; 1797–1808	Succeeded by Office abolished Re-established 1814: Francisco Javier Mier Campillo
Preceded by Joaquín Company Soler	Archbishop of Zaragoza; 1801–1816	Succeeded by Manuel Vicente Martínez Jiménez
