= Cayetano Ripoll =

Spanish schoolmaster (1788–1826)

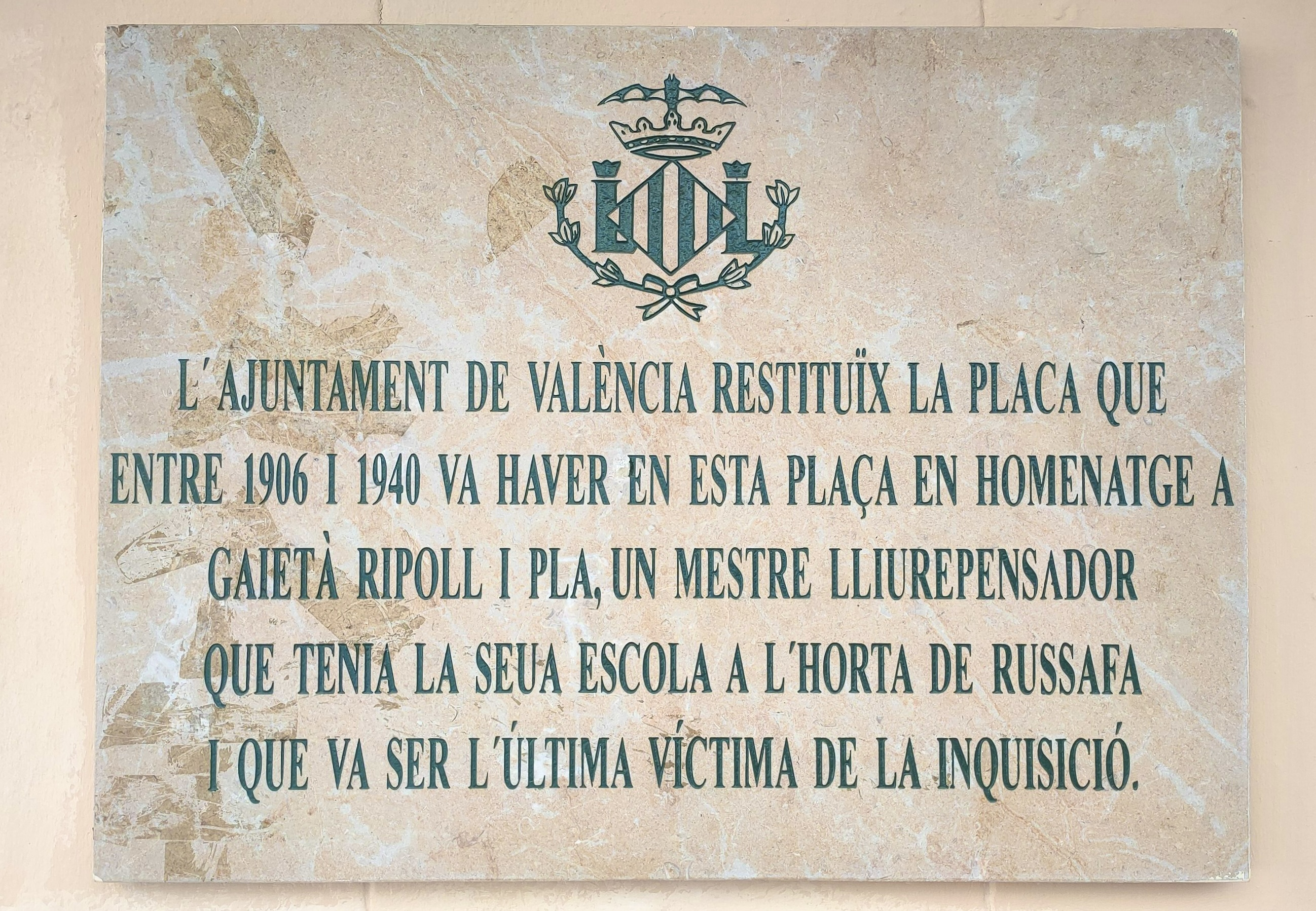
Plaque in Valencia in memory of Gaietà Ripoll

Gaietà Ripoll I Pla (Spanish: Cayetano Ripoll) (born 1778, thought to be in Solsona – 26 July 1826 in Valencia) was a Catalan schoolmaster who was the last person executed in Spain for heresy, specifically for teaching deism to his students.

== Life ==
Ripoll was a soldier in the Spanish army during the Peninsular War (1807–1814). French forces captured him, and he was a prisoner of war. While being held, he associated with a group of Quakers and became aware of deism. He soon became a deist.

Upon returning to Spain, he used his position as a schoolmaster to teach others about deism. There, the local church Board of Faith (Junta de Fe) soon accused him of being a deist and teaching his students about deism. He was later arrested for heresy and held in jail for nearly two years.

== Accusation ==
The Chairman of the Board of Faith from the Diocese of Valencia, Miguel Toranzo, a former inquisitor with the defunct Spanish Inquisition, sent to the nuncio Archbishop of Valencia a report that said Ripoll did not believe in Jesus Christ, in the mystery of the Trinity, in the Incarnation of God the Son, in the Holy Eucharist, in the Virgin Mary, in the Holy Gospels, in the infallibility of the Holy Catholic Church, or the Apostolic Roman Congregation. Ripoll did not fulfill his Easter duty. He discouraged children from reciting the 'Ave Maria Purisima' and suggested they need not bother making the sign of the cross. According to Ripoll, it was not necessary to hear Mass in order to save one's soul from damnation, and he did not instruct them to give reverence to the Sacraments of the Catholic Church, and to the Viaticum.

Ripoll was detained by the state and subjected to a two year "trial" on no legal basis by the Board of Faith theologians, in collusion with local rightist officials. The royal, papal and public displeasure over the clandestine attempt by rightists to re-start the Spanish Inquisition under a new name caused the suppression of the Boards of Faith.

== Sentence ==
For his denial of the Catechism of the Catholic Church the Junta de Fe clergymen requested Ripoll be burnt at the stake for his religious offenses. However, the civil authority chose to hang him instead. Allegedly, the Church authorities, upset that Ripoll had not been burned at the stake, placed his body into a barrel, painted flames on it and buried it in unconsecrated ground. Other reports state that the Church authorities placed his body into a barrel and burned the barrel, throwing the ashes into a river.

Ripoll is sometimes claimed as the last known person to be executed under "sentence" from a Church authority (even if not legally binding on the state) for having committed the act of heresy. Ripoll's famous last words were, "I die reconciled to God and man."
