= Francisco Javier Mier Campillo =

Spanish bishop and Grand Inquisitor

Francisco Javier Mier Campillo (1748–1818) was a Spanish bishop who was Grand Inquisitor of Spain from 1814 to 1818.

== Biography ==
Francisco Javier Mier Campillo was born in Alles near Peñamellera Alta on February 18, 1748.

He was appointed Bishop of Almería on May 24, 1802, and he was consecrated as a bishop in September 1802. When the Spanish Inquisition was re-established in 1814, he became Grand Inquisitor of Spain, a post he held until his death. He resigned as Bishop of Almería on December 16, 1815.

He died on May 20, 1818.

Catholic Church titles
Preceded by Juan Antonio de la Virgen María	Bishop of Almería; 1802 – 1815	Succeeded by Antonio Pérez Minayo
Preceded by Ramón José de Arce; Inquisition abolished 1808-14	Grand Inquisitor of Spain; 1814–1818	Succeeded by Gerónimo Castillón y Salas
