= Gerónimo Castillón y Salas =

Spanish bishop and Grand Inquisitor

Gerónimo Castillón y Salas (1756–1835) was a Spanish bishop who was the last Grand Inquisitor of Spain.

== Biography ==
Gerónimo Castillón y Salas was born in Lascellas-Ponzano on September 30, 1756, the second son of José Castillón y Campo and his wife Brígida Salas. He was educated at the University of Huesca, receiving a law degree on May 15, 1776 and a degree in theology on September 9, 1779.

After he was ordained as a priest, he served in Monzón, before becoming priest in his home town of Ponzano in 1795. He was schoolmaster at Huesca Cathedral from 1808 to 1815.

He became Bishop of Tarazona in 1815. He became Grand Inquisitor of Spain in 1818, and in this capacity was the head of the Spanish Inquisition until its abolition in 1820. King Fernando VII had initially asked his confessor, the Canary Islands priest Cristóbal Bencomo y Rodríguez, take on the office, but he had refused it.

He died in Tarazona in 1835.

== See also ==
Catholic Church titles
Preceded by Francisco Porró y Reinado	Bishop of Tarazona; 1815–1835	Succeeded by Vicente Ortíz y Labastida
Preceded by Francisco Javier Mier Campillo	Grand Inquisitor of Spain; 1818–1820	Succeeded by Office abolished
