= List of bishops of Jaén =

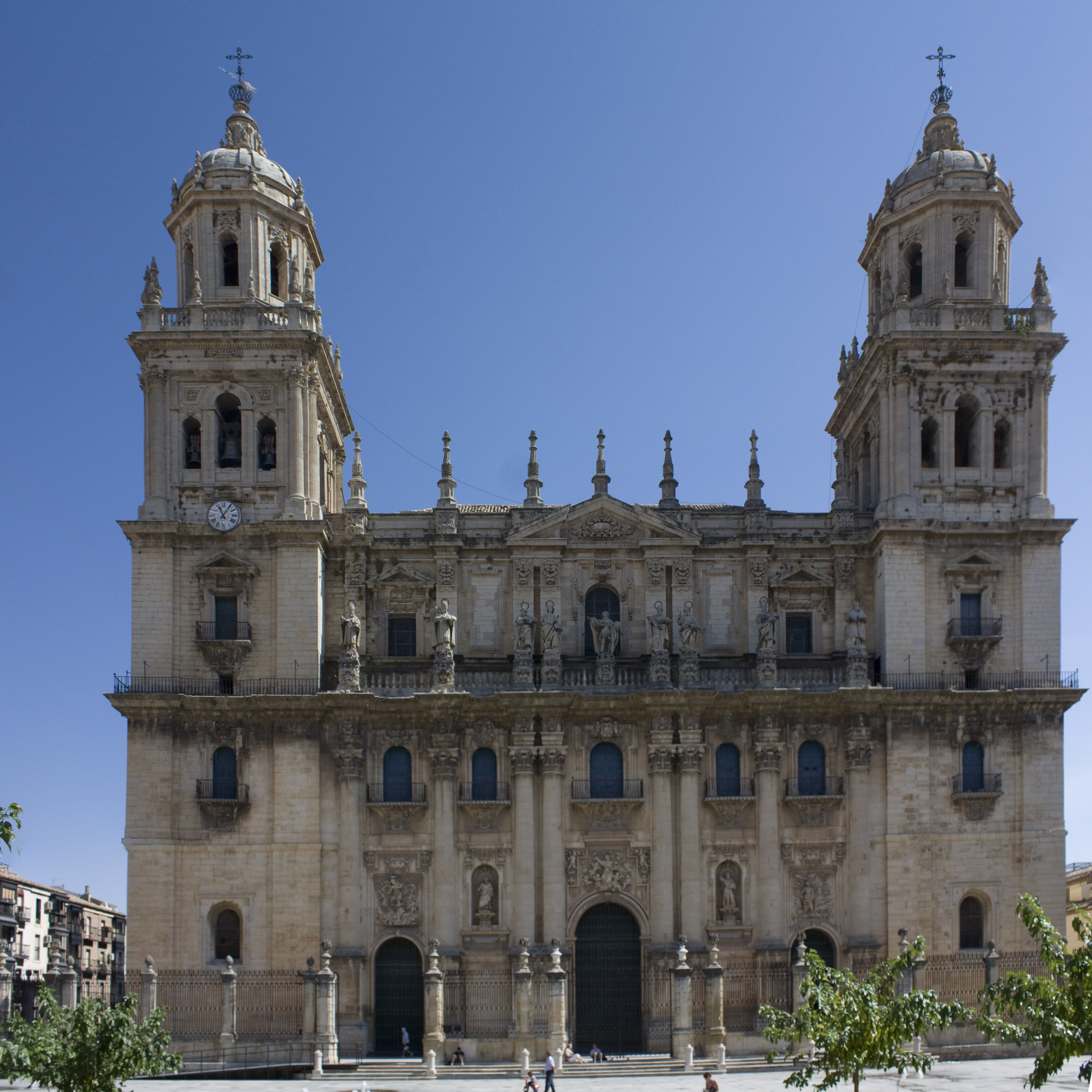
Jaén Cathedral, seat of the Diocese of Jaén.

Bishopric of Jaén
Diocese of Jaén, suffragan of the Archdiocese of Granada
| Date of establishment | 14 May 1249 |
| Recognized by | Innocent IV |
| First bishop | Pedro Martínez |
| Bishop since 2021 | Sebastián Chico Martínez |
| Emeritus bishops | Ramón del Hoyo López; Amadeo Rodríguez Magro |
| Pope since 2013 | Francis |

The Bishop of Jaén is the prelate whose bishopric is the Diocese of Jaén, a suffragan of the Archdiocese of Granada in Andalusia, Spain. Its seats are the Cathedral of the Assumption in Jaén and the Cathedral of the Nativity of Our Lady in Baeza. The Bishop of Jaén exercises his functions in the diocese, which encompasses the entire Province of Jaén with 97 municipalities across a total area of 13,489 km² and a population of 664,916 inhabitants as of 1 January 2013. The patrons of the Diocese of Jaén are Saint Euphrasius and Our Lady of Cabeza.

Since the diocese was established in 1249 under Pope Innocent IV, a total of 70 bishops have served. The first was Pedro Martínez, who succeeded Friar Domingo de Soria at the Baeza seat. Ferdinand III from Córdoba issued a privilege dated 6 March 1249 granting the title of Bishop of Jaén, confirmed by Innocent IV with a papal bull on 14 May 1249. Currently, Sebastián Chico Martínez is the bishop, appointed on 25 October 2021, with Ramón del Hoyo López and Amadeo Rodríguez Magro as emeritus bishops, since the former took office on 27 November 2021.

In the Concordat of 1851, the desire for diocesan demarcation was expressed, but it was not until 1873 that the special jurisdictions of the Abbey of Alcalá la Real and the Vicariates of the Military Orders were suppressed. Following state provisions, Pope Pius IX, through apostolic letters, united the Abbey of Alcalá and the vicariates of Segura, Beas, and Martos to the Diocese of Jaén on 14 July 1873. As a result, in 1893, Bishop Manuel María León González y Sánchez territorially reorganized the diocese, except for the Adelantamiento de Cazorla, which remained under the Archdiocese of Toledo until 1954, when Pope Pius XII decreed its annexation to the Diocese of Jaén through the decree Maiori animarum bono of the Consistorial Congregation on 23 April 1954.

== Statistics ==
Statistics of the Bishops of the Diocese of Jaén
| Data | Date | Number | Bishops | Image |
|---|---|---|---|---|
| Held synods | (1360-) | 8 | Alfonso Fernández Pecha, Íñigo Manrique de Lara, Luis Osorio de Acuña, Alonso Suárez de la Fuente del Sauce, Francisco Sarmiento de Mendoza, Baltasar Moscoso y Sandoval, Antolín Monescillo y Viso, and Rafael García y García de Castro. | |
| Participated in the Council of Constance | 1417 | 1 | Rodrigo Fernández de Narváez. | |
| Participated in the Council of Trent | (1545-1563) | 3 | Francisco de Mendoza y Pacheco, Pedro Pacheco de Villena, and Francisco Delgado López. | |
| Participated in the First Vatican Council and Second Vatican Council | (1869-1870) (1962-1965) | 3 | Antolín Monescillo y Viso, Rafael García y García de Castro, and Félix Romero Mengíbar. | |
| Were Grand Inquisitors | (1483-1834) | 4 | Diego de Deza (1498-1507, resigned), Bernardo de Sandoval y Rojas (1608-1618), Manuel Isidro Orozco Manrique de Lara (1742-1746), and Agustín Rubín de Ceballos (1784-1793). | |
| Associated with the Inquisition | (1483-1834) | 4 | Diego Tavera Ponce de León (counselor), Diego de los Cobos Molina (counselor), Fernando Andrade Castro (counselor), Antonio de Piña Hermosa (counselor). | |
| Were presidents of the Council of Castile | (1402-1834) | 3 | Íñigo Manrique de Lara, Alonso Suárez de la Fuente del Sauce, Francisco Sarmiento de Mendoza (resigned), Juan Asensio Barrios. | |
| Were auditors of the Rota | (1331-) | 4 | Diego Tello de Deza, Francisco Sarmiento de Mendoza, Juan Queipo de Llano y Flórez, and Benito de Omaña. | |
| Were Patriarchs of the West Indies | (1524-1963) | 3 | Esteban Gabriel Merino, Antolín Monescillo y Viso, and Victoriano Guisasola y Menéndez. | |
| Were cardinals | (1249-) | 6 | Esteban Gabriel Merino, Pedro Pacheco de Villena, Bernardo de Sandoval y Rojas, Baltasar Moscoso y Sandoval, Antolín Monescillo y Viso, and Victoriano Guisasola y Menéndez. | |
| Bishops of Jaén who were/are archbishops | | 13 | Bari: Esteban Gabriel Merino; Granada: Rafael García y García de Castro; Mérida-Badajoz: Santiago García Aracil; Palermo: Fernando Andrade Castro; Santiago de Compostela: Manuel Isidro Orozco Manrique de Lara; Seville: Íñigo Manrique de Lara, Diego de Deza, and Salvador Castellote y Pinazo; Tarragona: Andrés Esteban Gómez; Toledo: Bernardo de Sandoval y Rojas, Baltasar Moscoso y Sandoval, Antolín Monescillo y Viso, and Victoriano Guisasola y Menéndez; Valencia: Antolín Monescillo y Viso and Victoriano Guisasola y Menéndez; Valladolid: Félix Romero Mengíbar. | |

== List of bishops ==
Bishops of Jaén from 14 May 1249 to the present
| Order | Bishop | From | To | Events | Coat of Arms |
|---|---|---|---|---|---|
| I | Pedro Martínez; Appointment: 6 March 1249 | 14 May 1249 | 1250 | (Soria ? - ?); During the reconquest of Baeza, he served as chancellor to Ferdinand III. He succeeded Bishop of Baeza Friar Domingo upon his death, and a papal bull of 1249 named him the first Bishop of Jaén. However, during his transfer from Baeza to Jaén in late 1249 or early 1250, he died en route. | |
| II | Pascual; Appointment: | 1250 | 5 December 1275 | (Soria ? - ?); Canon of Baeza, he served as veinticuatro when the city was reconquered in 1227. The main mosque of Úbeda, which King Ferdinand III designated as the main parish church, was elevated by Bishop Pascual to the status of a collegiate church on 6 June 1259. | |
| III | Martín Domínguez; Appointment: 5 February 1276 | 12 April 1276 | 29 November 1283 | (Soria ? - Jaén 29 November 1283); During his tenure, the Convent of Our Lady of Mercy in Baeza was built (demolished in the 19th century), founded by Peter Pascual, who later became Bishop of Jaén. He was a key figure in resolving disputes between the Order of Calatrava and the Bishopric of Jaén over certain possessions, settling the matter with its master Juan González. | |
| IV | Juan I Appointment: 30 November 1283 | 8 December 1283 | 1285 | (Soria ? - ?); Prebendary (Note: A prebendary was an honorary canon of a cathedral or collegiate church. Source: RAE) and later canon and maestrescuela of the Cathedral of Jaén. He appears as a confirmer in a privilege granted in Segovia on 23 December 1284 by King Sancho IV, which granted Arjona its boundaries and the Fuero of Toledo, stating it was the same as that governing the city of Jaén. | |
| | (Sede vacante) | 1285 | 24 June 1285 | The see was vacant for a few months. Discontent arose over the appointments of bishops from the Province of Soria. | |
| V | Juan II; Appointment: | 1285 | April 1286 | (Soria ? - ?); He served as bishop for less than a year. He appeared only in a privilege granted by Sancho the Brave dated 20 December 1285. | |
| | (Sede vacante) | 1286 | 1287 | Problems continued with the appointments of bishops from the Province of Soria, and conflicts arose with the canons of Jaén. | |
| VI | Juan III; Appointment: 31 August 1287 | 31 August 1287 | 1289 | (Soria ? - ?); He presented himself to the Toledo see to request his appointment as Bishop of Jaén, which was granted by the Archbishop of Toledo Gonzalo García Gudiel. During his tenure, Peter Pascual founded another Convent of Mercy in Jaén. | |
| | (Sede vacante); Juan Miguel; Fortún García (Elected) | February 1289 | 5 February 1296 | (? - ?); Upon the death of Juan III, the cathedral chapter members could not agree on the election of a new bishop. Members from Soria supported one of their own, Juan Miguel, while those from Jaén, unhappy with this custom, chose Fortún García, also a canon but a native of Jaén; thus, the diocese remained vacant for the following years. | |
| VII | Saint Peter Pascual, O. de M. Appointment: | 27 February 1296 | 6 December 1300 | (Valencia ca. 1227 - Granada, 6 December 1300); He assumed the position in mid-1296. During a pastoral visit to the diocese, he was captured by Moors and taken to Granada, where he died in captivity. Pope Clement X canonized him in 1670, and his feast day is celebrated on 23 October. | |
| VIII | García Pérez; Appointment: 5 March 1301 | 8 October 1301 | 1316 | (Osma Soria ? - Úbeda, Jaén, late 1316); Canon and archdeacon of Úbeda. In March 1301, the dean and cathedral chapter of Jaén requested the Archbishop of Toledo, Gonzalo Díaz Palomeque, to appoint García Pérez following the death of the previous bishop. He is buried in the Collegiate Church of Úbeda. | |
| IX | Gutierre Téllez; Appointment: | 13 February 1317 | 1 October 1322 | (Soria ? - Úbeda, Jaén, 1322); He succeeded his predecessor in February 1317 and was confirmed by the Archbishop of Toledo, Gutierre Gómez de Toledo. He was promoted to bishop in the diocese of Idanha in Portugal. | |
| X | Fernando Ramírez de Ágreda; Appointment: | 1322 | 19 January 1335 | (? - Badajoz, 1344); He served as Bishop of Porto from 1312 to 1322, when he was appointed Bishop of Jaén in place of his predecessor. In 1335, he was transferred again to the Diocese of Badajoz, where he served as bishop until his death. | |
| XI | Juan de Morales; Appointment: | 19 January 1335 | 1357 | (Soria ? - ?); Canon regular of the collegiate church of San Pedro, prior of Osma. He was elected Bishop of Jaén following the transfer of his predecessor. King Alfonso XI granted him the mayoralty of the Tíscar Castle in the town of Quesada. | |
| XII | Juan Lucronio; Appointment: | 21 August 1357 | 5 October 1359 | (? - ?); Archdeacon of the church of Valderas in León. He also served as chaplain to Innocent VI, who appointed him Bishop of the Diocese of Jaén, later of Sigüenza, and subsequently of Burgos. | |
| XIII | Andrés; Appointment: | 1360 | 1367 | (? - ? 1367); Following the transfer of his predecessor and with no appointment from the papal see, the chapter appointed Andrés, a canon of Jaén, who served until his death. | |
| XIV | Alfonso Fernández Pecha; Appointment: | 1367 | July 1368 | (Guadalajara, 1330 - Rome, 19 August 1389); After the transfer of Juan Lucronio, the new appointment was delayed for a few months by the pope, who was based in Avignon, while the cathedral chapter of Jaén chose Andrés. Despite the dual appointment of bishops in Jaén, there was no issue since Alfonso lacked the required age when proposed and entered the diocese after Andrés' death. In 1368, he held the I Diocesan Synod of Jaén, and that same year he resigned. He went to Rome and became the confessor of Saint Bridget of Sweden. | |
| XV | Nicolás de Biedma; Appointment: | 1368 | 1378 | (Galicia, ? - Jaén, 7 March 1383); Canon of Seville and archdeacon of Écija. Appointed bishop by Urban V after Alfonso Pecha resigned. He restored the Holy Face to Jaén. He was later appointed Bishop of Cuenca. | |
| XVI | Juan de Castromocho; Appointment: | 1378 | 1381 | (Castromocho, ? - Palencia, 1397); Descendant of the House of Lemos, he served as chaplain to King Peter I of Castile until his death in 1369 at Montiel. He then went to England to serve as confessor to Catherine of Lancaster, whom he accompanied to Castile for her marriage to Henry III, who granted him the bishopric of Jaén. He was later appointed Bishop of Sigüenza. | |
| XVII | Nicolás de Biedma; Appointment: | 20 August 1381 | 7 March 1383 | Bishop of Jaén for the second time, after his request to transfer from Cuenca to the Diocese of Jaén was approved. | |
| XVIII | Rodrigo Fernández de Narváez; Appointment: | 4 November 1383 | 1422 | (Baeza, ? - Ibidem, 1422); He served as archdeacon of Jaén. A descendant of Sancho Ruiz de Narváez, one of the first settlers of Baeza, he founded the Collegiate Church of Baeza and participated in the Council of Constance in 1417. His pontificate in Jaén lasted nearly 39 years, the longest in the diocese's history. | |
| XIX | Gonzalo de Stuñiga; Appointment: | 2 October 1422 | 27 June 1456 | (Valladolid 1390 - Granada 24 March 1457); He fought in the Granada War and assisted his brother Pedro de Zúñiga, Count of Plasencia and Ledesma, in conflicts against Álvaro de Luna. Appointed Bishop of Plasencia and transferred to the Diocese of Jaén by a papal bull of Martin V. He actively participated in several battles against the Moors of Granada. | |
| | Friar Jaime Tauste, O. de M. (Did not take office) | 1456 | 1457 | (Valencia, 1375 - Calabria, 1461); He went to Rome as procurator general in the service of Nicholas V, succeeded by Callixtus III. When the Diocese of Jaén became vacant, the pope appointed him bishop, unaware that the Jaén church had already chosen Alfonso Vázquez de Acuña. Ultimately, the pope acceded to the Castilian king's request to reward Jaime and appointed him Bishop of Calabria. | |
| XX | Alfonso Vázquez de Acuña; Appointment: 10 May 1457 | 4 August 1457 | 9 May 1474 | (? - Begíjar, Jaén 9 May 1474); He held the position of Bishop of Mondoñedo (1455-1457) and was later promoted by Callixtus III to the Diocese of Jaén. Disputes arose between the bishop and the Constable Miguel Lucas de Iranzo. The bishop was eventually ordered by the king to move to his fortress in Begíjar, where he died. | |
| | (Sede vacante) | 1474 | 1475 | The Diocese of Jaén remained vacant for two years, from May 1474 until mid-1476, when the new bishop took office. | |
| XXI | Íñigo Manrique de Lara y de Castilla; Appointment: 1475 | 10 May 1475 | 15 January 1483 | (? - Seville, 1485); Bishop of Oviedo from 1444 to 1457, then appointed Bishop of Coria. In 1476, he took over the Diocese of Jaén until 1483, when he was appointed Archbishop of Seville. He also served as President of the Council of Castile from 1479 to 1484. He held the II Diocesan Synod of Jaén. | |
| XXII | Luis Osorio de Acuña; Appointment: 1483 | 15 January 1483 | 9 October 1496 | (Astorga, León, ? – Flanders, 1496); He held positions as coadjutor for the governance of the Archbishopric of Santiago, president of the Royal Chancery of Valladolid, chief chaplain of the prince John, archdeacon of Astorga, and captain of the city of Alhama. He accompanied Princess Joanna for her marriage to Prince Philip and died in Flanders. He held the III Diocesan Synod of Jaén. | |
| XXIII | Friar Diego de Deza, O.P. Appointment: 14 February 1498 | 1498 | 1500 | (Toro, Zamora, 1443 – Seville, 9 June 1523); Bishop of Zamora from 1487 to 1494, then of Salamanca from 1494 to 1498, when he took the seat of Jaén. That same year, Alexander VI appointed him Grand Inquisitor, a position he held until 1507, when he resigned. In 1500, he was appointed Bishop of Palencia and in 1504 Archbishop of Seville until his death. | |
| XXIV | Alonso Suárez de la Fuente del Sauce; Appointment: 1500 | 7 February 1500 | 5 November 1520 | (Fuente el Saúz, Ávila, ? – Jaén, 5 November 1520); Bishop of Mondoñedo in 1493 and Bishop of Lugo from 1494 until 1500, when he was appointed Bishop of Jaén. He also held the positions of Grand Inquisitor and president of the Council of Castile by order of Isabella the Catholic. He financed the construction of the Bishop's Bridge over the Guadalquivir River at his own expense and exempted it from bridge tolls. He held the IV Diocesan Synod of Jaén. | |
| | (Sede vacante); Martín de Ocón | 1520 | 1523 | (? - Jaén ?); There was a vacancy for nearly two years; during this time, the licentiate Martín de Ocón, a canon of Jaén, served as provisor of the bishopric. | |
| | Friar Diego Gayangos, O.SS.T. (Died before taking office) | 1522 | 1522 | (Burgos ? - ?); He died a few days after his election without taking office. | |
| XXV | Esteban Gabriel Merino; Cardinal; Appointment: 12 June 1523 | 1523 | 1535 | (Santisteban del Puerto, c. 1472 - Rome, 28 July 1535); Pope Leo X appointed him Archbishop of Bari in 1513 and Bishop of León in 1517. His involvement in the Comuneros Revolt earned him the friendship and protection of Charles V. When Clement VII appointed him Bishop of Jaén in 1523, the cathedral was in a state of disrepair, so he requested a papal bull from the pope. Once issued, he hired the architect Andrés de Vandelvira. In 1535, he was named Cardinal of San Vitale. | |
| | Alessandro Farnese; Cardinal (Apostolic Administrator) | 30 July 1535 | 6 July 1537 | (Valentano, 5 October 1520 – Rome, 2 March 1589); He was the grandson of Pope Paul III and was only 15 years old when appointed Bishop of Jaén. The Church of Jaén opposed his appointment, and during those years of vacancy, Ruy López de Gamarra, a canon and dean of the cathedral, served as provisional administrator. | |
| | Alessandro Cesarini (Apostolic Administrator) | 6 July 1537 | June 1538 | (Rome, ? - Ibid., 13 February 1542); Throughout his ecclesiastical career, he served as Apostolic Administrator of the dioceses of Pamplona (1520–1538), Otranto (1526–1536), Alessano (1526–1531), Gerace (1534–1538), Catanzaro (1536), Oppido (1536–1538), and Jaén (1537–1538). Francisco de los Cobos promoted him, but his choice was not well-received. He later became Bishop of Cuenca from 1538 until his death. | |
| XXVI | Francisco de Mendoza y Pacheco; Appointment: 14 June 1538 | December 1538 | 1543 | (? - Speyer, 1543); Son of the Marquises of Mondéjar, Íñigo López de Mendoza y Quiñones and Francisca Pacheco. Bishop of Jaén; during his tenure, the University of Baeza was founded by Saint John of Ávila. He arrived in Jaén accompanied by his confessor, Martín Pérez de Ayala. He also served as a counselor to Charles V, which led him to be absent from the diocese for part of his episcopate, delegating duties to the licentiate Pedro de Mérida as provisional administrator. He accompanied the king on several trips and died during one of them in Speyer. He participated in the Council of Trent. | |
| XXVII | Pedro Pacheco de Villena; Cardinal; Appointment: 9 January 1545 | 9 June 1545 | 30 April 1554 | (Montalbán, Toledo, 29 June 1488 - Rome, 5 March 1560); Bishop of Mondoñedo (1532–1537), Ciudad Rodrigo (1537–1539), Pamplona (1539–1545), and also Bishop of Jaén from 1545. He was absent from the diocese and governed it through the auxiliary bishop Alonso Cristóbal Arquellada, a canon of Jaén, and Gabriel de Guevara, a magisterial canon. Appointed Cardinal by Pope Paul III on 16 December 1545. Bishop of Sigüenza (1554–1557). He moved to Rome in 1555, where he was Bishop of Albano in the Diocese of Rome (1557–1560). He participated in the Council of Trent. | |
| XXVIII | Diego Tavera Ponce de León; Appointment: 17 July 1555 | 1555 | 28 April 1560 | (Seville, ? - Toledo, 28 April 1560); Nephew of Cardinal Juan Tavera, which enabled him to be the first administrator of the Hospital de Tavera in Toledo, founded by his uncle. He also served as archdeacon of the Cathedral of Toledo, counselor of the Spanish Inquisition, and chief chaplain to Queen Elisabeth. During his tenure in Jaén, various works were undertaken in the cathedral. He died while attending the Provincial Council of Toledo. | |
| | Francisco de Benavides y Velasco (Died before taking office) | | 15 May 1560 | (? - Royal Monastery of Santa María de Guadalupe, 15 May 1560); Bishop of Cartagena de Indias from 1543 to 1550, Bishop of Mondoñedo until 1558, when he was transferred to Segovia until 1560. He died upon receiving the appointment as Bishop of Jaén, and his election did not take effect. | |
| XXIX | Diego de los Cobos Molina; Appointment: 4 September 1560 | 1560 | 8 September 1565 | (Úbeda, Jaén, 1516 - Jaén, 8 September 1565); Brother of Juan Vázquez de Molina and nephew of Francisco de los Cobos. He studied jurisprudence and theology at the University of Salamanca. He served as prior of Marmolejo, archdeacon of Coria, judge of the Chancery of Valladolid, and member of the Council of the Inquisition. Later, he was Bishop of Ávila and finally Bishop of Jaén until his death. He founded the Hospital de Santiago in Úbeda, where he is buried. | |
| XXX | Francisco Delgado López; Appointment: 26 April 1566 | 24 June 1566 | 2 October 1576 | (Villa de Pun, 1514 - Baeza, 1576); He served as vicar general and ordinary inquisitor. Bartolomé Carranza appointed him as his ordinary inquisitor and held positions as chaplain of the old kings of Toledo and rector of the Hospital de Tavera. He attended the final sessions of the Council of Trent. In 1565, he was sent to Toledo by Pope Pius IV for the case of Archbishop Carranza, which was later sentenced by the pope. In 1561, he was Bishop of Lugo, and from 1566, Bishop of Jaén. | |
| XXXI | Diego Tello de Deza; Appointment: 11 September 1577 | 1577 | 13 September 1579 | (Seville ? - Ibid., 13 September 1579); He was a collegian at the University of Salamanca, judge of the Chancery of Granada, and auditor of the Roman Rota. Bishop of Canarias, Coria, and from 1577, Jaén. Being elderly and ill, he did not take office and delegated duties to the provisional administrators Dr. Sánchez and Miguel González. | |
| XXXII | Francisco Sarmiento de Mendoza; Appointment: 27 May 1580 | 1580 | 9 June 1595 | (Burgos, 4 June 1525 - Jaén, 9 June 1595); Professor at the University of Salamanca, judge of the Chancery of Valladolid, and auditor of the Roman Rota. Philip II presented him to Pope Gregory XIII, who appointed him Bishop of Astorga, a position he held until his transfer to Jaén in 1580. During his episcopate, seven Discalced Carmelite convents were founded. After the dismissal of Francisco Zapata y Cisneros from the presidency of the Council of Castile in 1592, Sarmiento was appointed as his successor but declined the position, citing: "The obligations of prelates are too demanding." He convened the Fifth Diocesan Synod of Jaén. | |
| XXXIII | Bernardo de Sandoval y Rojas; Cardinal; Appointment: 18 March 1596 | 28 August 1596 | 1599 | (Aranda de Duero, 20 April 1546 - Toledo, 7 December 1618); Uncle of the favorite of Philip III, the 1st Duke of Lerma. His positions included: Bishop of Ciudad Rodrigo (1586–1588), Pamplona (1588–1596), and Jaén (1596–1599). Through his nephew's influence, he became a Cardinal, Archbishop of Toledo (1599–1618), Primate of Spain, Councilor of State, and from 1608 to 1618, Inquisitor General. He was also a patron of Cervantes. | |
| XXXIV | Sancho Dávila y Toledo; Appointment: 13 April 1600 | 10 June 1600 | 1615 | (Ávila, 9 October 1546 - Plasencia, 5 December 1625); Bishop of Cartagena, he took office in the See of Jaén in 1600. In 1615, he was appointed Bishop of Sigüenza and later transferred to the Diocese of Plasencia. | |
| XXXV | Francisco Martínez de Cenicero; Appointment: 13 August 1615 | 30 November 1615 | 28 November 1617 | (Cenicero, ? - Jaén, 28 November 1617); Bishop of Canarias, Cartagena, and later appointed Bishop of Jaén. | |
| XXXVI | Baltasar Moscoso y Sandoval; Cardinal; Appointment: 29 April 1619 | 30 October 1619 | 28 May 1646 | (Santiago de Compostela, 9 March 1589 - Madrid, 18 September 1665); Thanks to the influence of his uncle, Bernardo de Sandoval, he became a Cardinal at the age of 26. During his tenure in the Diocese of Jaén, significant works were carried out in the Jaén Cathedral. He was later appointed Archbishop of Toledo. In 1649, he officiated the marriage of King Philip IV to Mariana of Austria. He also held the positions of supreme Chancellor of Castile and Councilor of State, appointed by Philip IV. He convened the Sixth Diocesan Synod of Jaén. | |
| XXXVII | Juan Queipo de Llano y Flórez; Appointment: 18 February 1647 | 3 June 1647 | 3 November 1647 | (San Pedro de Arbás, 1584 - Jaén, 3 November 1647); In 1623, he became a judge at the Royal Chancery of Valladolid. Five years later, he served in Rome as an auditor of the Roman Rota. In 1634, he returned to Spain to take up the presidency of Valladolid. He was Bishop of Pamplona from 1637 and interim viceroy of Navarre several times between 1644 and 1647, during which he convened the Cortes of Navarre. In 1647, he was transferred to Jaén, where he died the same year. | |
| XXXVIII | Fernando Andrade Castro; Appointment: 6 July 1648 | 12 October 1648 | 21 February 1664 | (? - Jaén, 21 February 1664); Professor at the University of Salamanca and Inquisitor of the Supreme General Inquisition. He consecrated the Jaén Cathedral in 1660. | |
| XXXIX | Antonio de Piña Hermosa; Appointment: 11 August 1664 | 1664 | 14 July 1667 | (Burgos, early 17th century, - Jaén, 19 July 1667); Collegian of Oviedo, judge of Pamplona and Granada, professor at the University of Salamanca, president of the Chancery of Valladolid, and Counselor of the Inquisition. Appointed Bishop of Salamanca, Málaga, and Jaén. | |
| XL | Friar Jerónimo Rodríguez de Valderas, O. de M. Appointment: 9 April 1668 | 1668 | 17 March 1671 | (Ciudad Rodrigo, Sa, 25 May 1592 - Baeza, Ja, 17 March 1671); Confessor of Juan Falconi. Bishop of Badajoz in 1662 and later Jaén. | |
| XLI | Antonio Fernández de Campo; Appointment: 1 July 1671 | 1671 | 23 December 1681 | (Valle de Mena, Burgos, ? - ?); He previously served as Bishop of Tui and Coria, and from 1671, Jaén. | |
| XLII | Friar Juan Asensio Barrios, O. de M. Appointment: 20 April 1682 | 1682 | 17 June 1692 | (Gibraltar, Kingdom of Seville, c. 1619 - Jaén, 22 April 1692); Bishop of Ávila and later appointed Bishop of Jaén through the intercession of the Duke of Medinaceli. President of the Council of Castile. | |
| XLIII | Antonio de Brizuela y Salamanca; Appointment: 13 April 1693 | 1693 | 10 January 1708 | (San Martín de Hoyos, Valdeolea, Cantabria ? - Jaén, 10 January 1708); Collegian at the Mayor de la Santa Cruz in Valladolid, canon of the Cathedral of Toledo, member of the Royal Council of Castile, and knight of the Order of Calatrava. Bishop of Astorga from 1689 until 1693, when he was promoted to Bishop of Jaén. | |
| XLIV | Benito de Omaña; Appointment: 24 September 1708 | 1708 | 9 March 1712 | (Cangas de Tineo, Asturias, ? - Jaén, 9 March 1712); Auditor of the Roman Rota in 1704, he resided in Rome until 1708, when the pope promoted him to Bishop of Jaén. | |
| XLV | Rodrigo Marín Rubio; Appointment: 28 May 1714 | 1714 | 10 February 1732 | (Tíjola, Almería ? - ?); Canon of the Cathedral of Granada. At the proposal of Philip V, Pope Clement XI promoted him to the Diocese of Segorbe in 1704, and ten years later, the same pope appointed him Bishop of Jaén. | |
| XLVI | Manuel Isidro Orozco Manrique de Lara; Appointment: 21 July 1732 | 5 October 1732 | 4 May 1738 | (Madrid, 15 May 1681 - Ibid., 1 February 1745); Grand Inquisitor from 1742 to 1745, he owed his rise to the mitre of Jaén and also served as chaplain and almoner to Philip V. Appointed Archbishop of Santiago de Compostela in 1738. | |
| XLVII | Andrés Cabrejas Molina; Appointment: 5 May 1738 | 1738 | 4 September 1746 | (Cuenca, 30 November 1681 - Jaén, 4 September 1746); He was a canon of the Cuenca Cathedral when he was appointed bishop of Jaén. During his tenure, the choir stalls of the Jaén Cathedral were completed, and he is buried there. | |
| XLVIII | Francisco del Castillo y Veintimiglia; Appointment: 31 July 1747 | 1747 | 15 November 1749 | (Brussels, 18 February 1692 - Baeza, Jaén, 15 November 1749); Knight of the Order of Santiago, he abandoned the military to dedicate himself to the ecclesiastical ministry and became a canon of the Cathedral of Málaga. Promoted by Philip V in 1738, he was appointed Bishop of Barcelona. He received a papal bull from Pope Clement XII granting him the privilege of eating meat on forbidden days. In 1741, the king appointed him vicar general and chief chaplain of the royal armies. Appointed Bishop of Jaén in 1747, he governed the diocese for two years until his death in 1749 in Baeza, where he is buried in the Baeza Cathedral. | |
| XLIX | Friar Benito Marín, O.S.B. Appointment: 27 April 1750 | 1750 | 10 August 1769 | (Calahorra, La Rioja, 24 January 1694 - Jaén, 10 August 1769); Proposed in 1747 for the position of Bishop of Barbastro by Ferdinand VI of Spain, confirmed the following year by Pope Benedict XIV. That same year, the king appointed him president of the Royal Commission for a Single Tax. In 1750, he was appointed Bishop of Jaén at the king's request. | |
| L | Antonio Gómez de la Torre y Jarabeitia; Appointment: 28 May 1770 | 1770 | 23 March 1779 | (Bilbao, 27 November 1711 - Jaén, 23 March 1779); Senior college scholar of San Ildefonso de Alcalá, magisterial canon of Sigüenza and Granada; appointed Bishop of Ceuta and finally Bishop of Jaén. | |
| LI | Agustín Rubín de Ceballos; Appointment: 18 September 1780 | 1780 | 8 February 1793 | (Dueñas, Palencia, 24 July 1724 - Madrid, 8 February 1793); Canon of the Cuenca Cathedral, upon the death of the previous Bishop of Jaén, King Charles III proposed him for the position and also made him his counselor to the Holy See. He oversaw the works on the main altar and the retable of Saint Euphrasius, dedicating a chapel to him in the Jaén Cathedral, funded by the income from his position as Grand Inquisitor. | |
| LII | Pedro Rubio-Benedicto y Herrero; Appointment: 21 February 1794 | 1794 | 27 May 1795 | (Valdepeñas, Ciudad Real, 1712 - Jaén, 1796); Promoted by Charles III to the Diocese of Mallorca, and already ill, he was appointed Bishop of Jaén, where he governed for less than a year. | |
| LIII | Friar Diego Melo de Portugal, O.S.A. Appointment: 18 December 1795 | 1795 | 22 January 1816 | (Badajoz, 24 May 1734 – Valdepeñas de Jaén, 22 January 1816); Bishop of Osma from 1794 until 1795, when he moved to the Diocese of Jaén. During his episcopate, the French invasion and occupation of Jaén by Napoleon's troops occurred. He resided for some time in Valdepeñas de Jaén, where a palace had been built. | |
| LIV | Andrés Esteban Gómez; Appointment: 22 July 1816 | 1816 | 17 June 1831 | (Alustante, Guadalajara, 10 November 1766 - Jaén, 17 June 1831); Canon of the Cathedral of Sigüenza. Secretary of the Defense Board of Guadalajara during the French invasion and deputy for the Cortes of Cádiz. Appointed Bishop of Ceuta in 1814 and also Bishop of Jaén from 1816. Later, he was promoted to Archbishop of Tarragona and resigned from the position. | |
| LV | Diego Martínez Carlón y Teruel; Appointment: | 23 February 1832 | 28 August 1836 | (Lorca, Murcia - Águilas, 28 August 1836); He served as precentor of Almería before being appointed Bishop of Teruel, and from 1832, Bishop of Jaén, though he remained there for only a short time. After the death of Ferdinand VII, he was considered a Carlist and was exiled to Águilas, Murcia, where he died in 1836. | |
| | (Vacant See) | 1836 | 1840 | A series of circumstances, including the Confiscation of Mendizábal, caused friction with the Vatican. The nuncio left Spain in 1835. The support given by the regent queen Maria Christina to the liberals led to her exile, along with the rise of General Espartero, who began appointing bishops on his own authority from 1840. | |
| | (Vacant See); Antonio Martínez de Velasco (Intruder Bishop) | 1840 | 1842 | (? - Madrid, 1842); Canon of Valencia, he could not perform episcopal functions due to lack of episcopal authorization, though he performed administrative duties. | |
| | (Vacant See); Manuel Ventura Gómez Lechuga (Intruder Bishop) | 1842 | 1844 | (Baeza ? - ?); Canon of Málaga, he never appeared in Jaén. He died in Madrid in 1844. | |
| | (Vacant See) | 1844 | 1847 | The see remained vacant until a cordial agreement was reached with the Vatican, and the Concordat of 1851 was signed. | |
| LVI | José Escolano y Fenoy; Appointment: 17 December 1847 | 1847 | 21 July 1854 | (Granada, 4 February 1805 - Ibid., 21 July 1854); Professor at the University of Granada and canon of Jaén, he was appointed Bishop of Jaén after the see had been vacant for ten years, as relations with the Vatican began to normalize. During his episcopate, the Concordat between Spain and the Holy See was signed. He served as a senator of the kingdom. | |
| LVII | Tomás Roda Rodríguez; Appointment: 11 December 1857 | February 1858 | 11 March 1858 | (Murtas, Granada, 18 September 1779 – Jaén, 11 March 1858); Bishop of the Diocese of Menorca from 1852 until 1857, when he was transferred to Jaén for a brief episcopate. | |
| LVIII | Andrés Rosales Muñoz; Appointment: 25 June 1858 | 17 November 1858 | 1864 | (Iznájar, Córdoba, 21 October 1807 – Almería, 10 October 1872); Isabel II appointed him canon of Almería Cathedral, and later capitular canon and fiscal of the Archdiocese of Granada. He was proposed by Pope Pius IX to lead the Diocese of Jaén when it became vacant, but he contracted herpes and scabies, leading to his transfer in 1864 to the Diocese of Almería, where he served as bishop until his death. | |
| LIX | Antolín Monescillo y Viso; Cardinal; Appointment: 27 March 1865 | 1865 | 1877 | (Corral de Calatrava, C. Real, 2 September 1811 – Toledo, 11 August 1897); In 1861, he was appointed Bishop of Calahorra and in 1865, Bishop of Jaén. He attended the First Vatican Council convened by Pope Pius IX. In 1872, he convened the VII Diocesan Synod of Jaén. Appointed Archbishop of Valencia in 1877, elected cardinal in 1884, and in 1892, Archbishop of Toledo, where he died. | |
| LX | Manuel María León González y Sánchez; Appointment: 22 June 1877 | 1877 | 20 October 1896 | (Seville, 1825 – Jaén, 20 October 1896); Canon and Auxiliary Bishop of Seville. In 1877, he was appointed Bishop of Jaén. | |
| LXI | Victoriano Guisasola y Menéndez; Cardinal; Appointment: 19 April 1897 | 1897 | 1901 | (Oviedo, 21 April 1852 – Toledo, 2 September 1920); Appointed Bishop of Osma. In 1897, he assumed leadership of the Diocese of Jaén, initiating construction of the Diocesan Seminary. In 1901, he moved to the Diocese of Madrid-Alcalá. In 1905, Pope Pius X appointed him Archbishop of Valencia at the request of King Alfonso XIII. From 1914, he was Archbishop of Toledo and was made cardinal by Pius X that year. He also served as a Senator of the Kingdom and member of the Royal Academy of History. | |
| LXII | Salvador Castellote y Pinazo; Appointment: 16 December 1901 | 1901 | 1906 | (Valencia, 10 March 1846 – Jaén, 23 December 1906); Bishop of Menorca in 1886 and in 1901, Bishop of Jaén. He inaugurated the new Seminary building in 1905; the following year, he was promoted to Archbishop of Seville, a position he could not assume because, during a farewell tribute in the Cathedral of Jaén’s pulpit, he suffered a collapse and died shortly after. He is buried in the cathedral. | |
| LXIII | Juan José Laguarda y Fenollera; Appointment: 6 December 1906 | 1906 | 1909 | (Valencia, 22 April 1866 – Barcelona, 4 December 1913); Appointed by Pope Leo XIII in 1899 as secretary and auxiliary bishop of the Archdiocese of Toledo, in 1902 Bishop of Urgell and Co-Prince of Andorra. Appointed Bishop of Jaén in 1906, during his tenure, Pope Pius X proclaimed Our Lady of Cabeza as patroness of the Diocese of Jaén; on the same day of the coronation, 20 April, he was appointed Bishop of Barcelona. | |
| LXIV | Juan Manuel Sanz y Saravia; Appointment: 29 April 1909 | 1909 | 19 June 1919 | (P. de los Infantes, Seville, 13 March 1848 – Seville, 19 June 1919); Promoted to the Diocese of León in 1904 until 1909, when he took charge of the Diocese of Jaén. In 1915, his health began to decline, and the following year, a hemiplegia prevented him from continuing his duties. In 1917, Friar Plácido Ángel was appointed apostolic administrator. | |
| | Friar Plácido Ángel Rey de Lemos, O.F.M. (Apostolic Administrator) | 1917 | 1919 | (Lugo ? – ?); In 1896, he joined the Franciscans and later, in 1906, was called to Rome. He was appointed Apostolic Administrator on 18 January 1917 and subsequently named Bishop of Lugo on 18 December 1919, replacing Manuel Basulto, who was appointed Bishop of Jaén. | |
| LXV | Blessed Manuel Basulto Jiménez; Appointment: 18 December 1919 | 14 June 1920 | 12 August 1936 | (Adanero, 17 May 1869 – Pozo del Tío Raimundo, 12 August 1936); In 1909, he was Bishop of Lugo, and in 1919, Pope Benedict XV appointed him Bishop of Jaén. On 2 August 1936, he was arrested at the episcopal palace in Jaén and transferred to Madrid, where he was executed near Pozo del Tío Raimundo along with nearly 200 others. Servant of God. | |
| | Agustín Parrado García (Apostolic Administrator) | 1936 | 1942 | (Fuensaldaña, Valladolid, 5 October 1872 – Granada, 8 October 1946); Bishop of Palencia in 1925 and appointed Archbishop of Granada in 1934. During the Spanish Civil War, he took charge of the Diocese of Jaén, Guadix, and Almería. | |
| LXVI | Rafael García y García de Castro; Appointment: 29 December 1942 | 1942 | 1953; 1 May 1954 (Ap Adm) | (Miranda del Castañar, Salamanca, 18 October 1895 – Granada, 3 February 1974); Professor at the Pontifical University of Comillas. In 1932, he participated in the founding of the Diario Ideal. After the Spanish Civil War, he was appointed vicar general of the Diocese of Jaén, and in 1942, he assumed the role of bishop. He convened the VIII Diocesan Synod of Jaén. He participated in the Second Vatican Council. Appointed Archbishop of Granada in 1953, he remained in Jaén for a year until his successor arrived. | |
| LXVII | Félix Romero Mengíbar; Appointment: 16 January 1954 | 2 May 1954 | 11 September 1970 | (Priego de Córdoba, 7 November 1901 – Valladolid, 21 September 1974); Appointed Bishop of Jaén. He participated in the Second Vatican Council, and during his tenure, the Archpriesthood of Cazorla, dependent on the Archdiocese of Toledo since 1231, was annexed to the Diocese of Jaén. Appointed Archbishop of Valladolid in 1970. | |
| LXVIII | Miguel Peinado Peinado; Appointment: 30 April 1971 | 20 June 1971 | 12 February 1988 (resigned due to age) | (Bérchules, Granada, 4 October 1911 – Granada, 12 February 1993); Bishop of Jaén, he worked to promote the renewing spirit of the Second Vatican Council in the diocese and developed pastoral and catechetical work similar to that carried out in his Granada parish. | |
| LXIX | Santiago García Aracil; Appointment: 31 May 1988 | 3 July 1988 | 3 September 2004 | (Valencia, 8 May 1940 – ibid., 28 December 2018); Founder of the Valencia University Studies Center in 1971. Ordained auxiliary bishop of Valencia in 1984 until 1988, when he was appointed Bishop of Jaén. In September 2004, he assumed the role of Archbishop of Mérida-Badajoz. | |
| | (Sede vacante) | 6 September 2004 | 2 July 2005 | (Santisteban del Puerto, Jaén, 14 September 1938); Rafael Higueras Álamo, dean of the Jaén Cathedral (2002–2007), served as diocesan administrator while awaiting the appointment of a new bishop. | |
| LXX | Ramón del Hoyo López; Appointment: 19 May 2005 | 2 July 2005 | 28 May 2016 | (Arlanzón, Burgos, 14 September 1940); Bishop of Cuenca from 1996 until 2005, when he assumed control of the Diocese of Jaén. Member of the (CEE) in the Episcopal Commission for Missions (1999–2008) and its president (2008–2011). Member of the «San Juan de Ávila, Doctor of the Church» Board since 2011. | |
| LXXI | Amadeo Rodríguez Magro; Appointment: 9 April 2016 | 28 May 2016 | 25 October 2021 | (San Jorge de Alor, Badajoz, 12 March 1946); Bishop of Plasencia from 2003 until his appointment to Jaén in 2016. | |
| LXXII | Sebastián Chico Martínez; Appointment: 25 October 2021 | 27 November 2021 | | (Cehegín, 12 May 1968); Auxiliary Bishop of Cartagena from 2019 until his appointment to Jaén in 2021. | |

=== Auxiliary bishops ===
Auxiliary bishops of Jaén
| Bishop | Start | End | Details | Coat of Arms |
|---|---|---|---|---|
| Pedro Fernández de Jaén; Appointment: 20 March 1525 | 2 April 1525 | ? | (Jaén ? – ?); Appointed auxiliary bishop of Jaén and Titular Bishop of Drivastum, serving under Cardinal Esteban Gabriel Merino. He was consecrated in Rome on 2 April 1525 by the Bishop of Pesaro, Paris de Grassis. | |
| Alonso Cristóbal Arquellada; Appointment: 4 July 1550 | 4 July 1550 | 1558 | (Jaén ? – Jaén, 1572); Canon of Jaén. Appointed auxiliary bishop of Jaén by Cardinal Pedro Pacheco de Villena, who did not reside in the diocese during his episcopate. Consequently, he delegated the governance of the Diocese of Jaén to the auxiliary bishop. | |

== Bibliography ==
- Anonymous (1794). Retrato al natural de la ciudad y término de Jaén: su estado antiguo y moderno, con la demostración de cuanto necesita mejorarse su población, agricultura y comercio [A realistic portrait of the city and municipality of Jaén: its ancient and modern state, demonstrating how much its population, agriculture, and trade need to be improved] (in Spanish). Jaén: Imprenta de D. Pedro de Doblas. p. 520. OCLC 55271737.
- Martínez Rojas, Francisco Juan (2001). Anotaciones al episcopologio giennense de los siglos XV y XVI [Notes on the episcopology of Jaén in the 15th and 16th centuries]. Jaén: Boletín del Instituto de Estudios Giennenses, no. 177. pp. 285–424. ISSN 0561-3590. OCLC 695307341.
- Montijano Chica, Juan (1986). Historia de la diócesis de Jaén y sus obispos [History of the Diocese of Jaén and its bishops] (in Spanish). Confederación Española de Centros de Estudios Locales : Excma. Diputación Provincial. Jaén: Instituto de Estudios Giennenses. p. 321. OCLC 18013502.
- Nicás Moreno, Andrés (1999). Heráldica y genealogía de los obispos de la Diócesis de Jaén [Heraldry and genealogy of the bishops of the Diocese of Jaén] (in Spanish). Diputación provincial de Jaén. Instituto de Estudios Giennenses. p. 245. OCLC 469560703.
- Rivera, Juan Francisco (1975). Notas y documentos para el episcopologio de la sede de Baeza-Jaén, durante los siglos XIII y XIV [Notes and documents related to the episcopology of the See of Baeza-Jaén during the 13th and 14th centuries]. Jaén: Boletín del Instituto de Estudios Giennenses, no. LXXX. p. 68. OCLC 38980386.
- Rodríguez de Gálvez, Ramón (1873). Apuntes históricos sobre el movimiento de la Sede Episcopal de Jaén y series correlativas de sus Obispos [Information about the movement of the Episcopal See of Jaén and its bishops, presented in a historical context]. Andalucía: Repositorio Biblioteca virtual de Andalucía. p. 118. OCLC 805904764.
- Rus Puerta, Francisco (1634). Historia eclesiástica del Reino y obispado de Jaén, Primera parte ... [Ecclesiastical History of the Kingdom and Bishopric of Jaén, Part One]. Jaén: Francisco Pérez de Castilla. pp. 312 (i.e. 624). OCLC 55268236.
- Ximena Jurado, Martín (1654). Catálogo de los obispos de las iglesias catedrales de la Diócesis de Jaén y anales eclesiásticos de este obispado [Catalogue of the bishops of the cathedral churches of the Diocese of Jaén and ecclesiastical annals of this bishopric] (in Spanish). Jaén. Administración eclesiástica. Madrid: Domingo García y Morras. p. 559. OCLC 433811415.
