= List of Bienes de Interés Cultural in the Province of Jaén =

This is a list of Bien de Interés Cultural landmarks in the Province of Jaén, Spain.

- Arc of San Lorenzo
- Baeza Cathedral
- Castillo de Albanchez de Mágina
- Castillo de Alcalá la Real
- Castillo de Alcaudete
- Castle of Aldehuela
- Castle of Burgalimar
- Giribaile Castle
- Castle of Santa Catalina (Jaén)
- Arab Baths of Jaén
- Jaén Cathedral
- Jaén Public Library
- Dominican priory, La Guardia de Jaén
- Basílica de Santa María de los Reales Alcázares, Úbeda
- Holy Chapel of the Savior, Úbeda
- Palacio del Deán Ortega, Úbeda
- Vázquez de Molina Palace, Úbeda
