= Ramón Lamoneda =

Spanish politician (1892–1971)

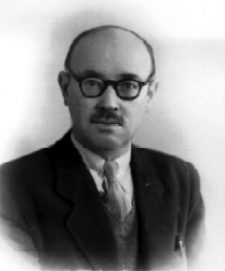

General secretary of the Spanish Socialist Workers' Party
- In office September 1938 – 1942

Personal details
- Born: 9 June 1892 Begíjar, Jaén
- Died: 27 February 1971 (aged 78) Mexico City
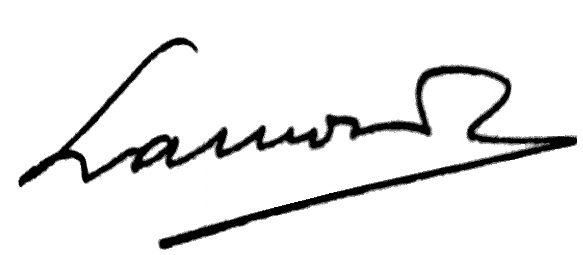
- Signature

Ramón Lamoneda Fernández (9 June 1892 – 27 February 1971) was a Spanish typographer and socialist politician who was the first general secretary of the Spanish Socialist Workers' Party.

== Early life ==
Lamoneda was born in Begíjar, Jaén, on 9 June 1892. His family moved to Madrid in 1904.

== Career ==
He began his career as a typographer in Madrid and became a member of the Graphic Federation of the General Union of Workers and the Socialist Youth group. Lamoneda went to Belgium in 1913 to attend the courses at the International Socialist School where he studied the work by Centrale d’Éducation Ouvrière. In August 1914 he joined the Spanish Socialist Workers' Party, and Manuel Núñez de Arenas and he were responsible for running of the party's education institution, Central de Educación Socialista, which was founded in 1913 to train future administrators. Lamoneda left the Spanish Socialist Workers' Party and joined the Communist Party in the 1920s. However, later he rejoined the Socialist Party. He and Mariano Garcia Cortes edited a socialist magazine entitled Nuestra Palabra.

Lamoneda was a deputy for the Cortes Generales for Granada following the elections in 1933 and 1936. In September 1938 he became the first general secretary of the Spanish Socialist Workers' Party. He was in office until 1942.

== Later years and death ==
In 1946 he went into exile in Mexico where he worked as a type director at various publishing houses. He died in Mexico City on 27 February 1971.

From 1946 to 2009 Lamoneda was not mentioned in the history of the Spanish Socialist Workers' Party. Lamoneda's membership status was rehabilitated on 12 December 2009 in a ceremony held in Madrid, and his membership card was given to his children.
