= Diego Hurtado de Mendoza y Quiñones =

Spanish noble

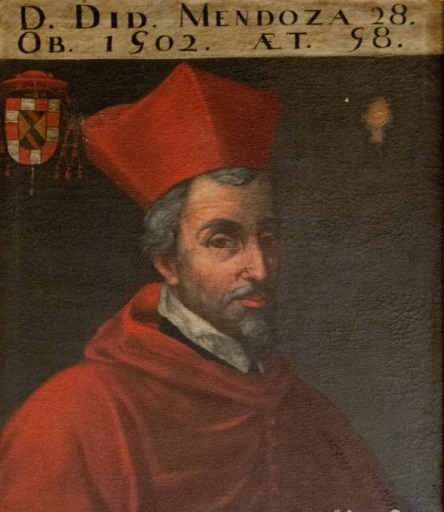
Cardinal Diego Hurtado de Mendoza y Quiñones

Diego Hurtado de Mendoza y Quiñones (b. Guadalajara, Spain, 1444 – d. Madrid, October 14, 1502) was a Spanish noble from the House of Mendoza and the Archbishop of Sevilla.

== Biography ==
He was the son of Íñigo López de Mendoza y Figueroa, and was the brother of Íñigo López de Mendoza y Quiñones, the second Count of Tendilla. He was the second cardinal in the Mendoza family, studying at the University of Salamanca, one of the two prestigious Spanish universities. In 1481, he began his clerical career as a steward to his uncle, the future cardinal Pedro González de Mendoza. At the time, his uncle was the Bishop of Plasencia. Diego later become Bishop of Palencia in 1471.

In 1485, Diego was made the Archbishop of Sevilla. Later in 1500, he was also named Patriarch of Alexandria and Cardinal of Santa Sabina.

Some authors name Diego Hurtado de Mendoza y Quiñones as Bishop of Sigüenza, however this is a historical error.

== Burial ==
Diego was buried first in the Convento de Santa Ana de Tendilla, of which he was an important benefactor and patron. Later, his remains were transferred to the Catedral de Santa María de la Sede de Sevilla to a marble sepulcher made by Domenico Fancelli and commissioned by his brother, Íñigo López de Mendoza y Quiñones.

== Predecessors and Successors ==
In his role as Bishop of Palencia, he was preceded by Rodrigo Sánchez de Arévalo, and succeeded by Alonso de Burgos. In his role as Archbishop of Sevilla, he was preceded by Iñigo Manrique de Lara (archbishop), and succeeded by Juan de Zúñiga y Pimentel.
