= Giribaile Castle =

Coordinates: 38.1224°N 3.4835°W

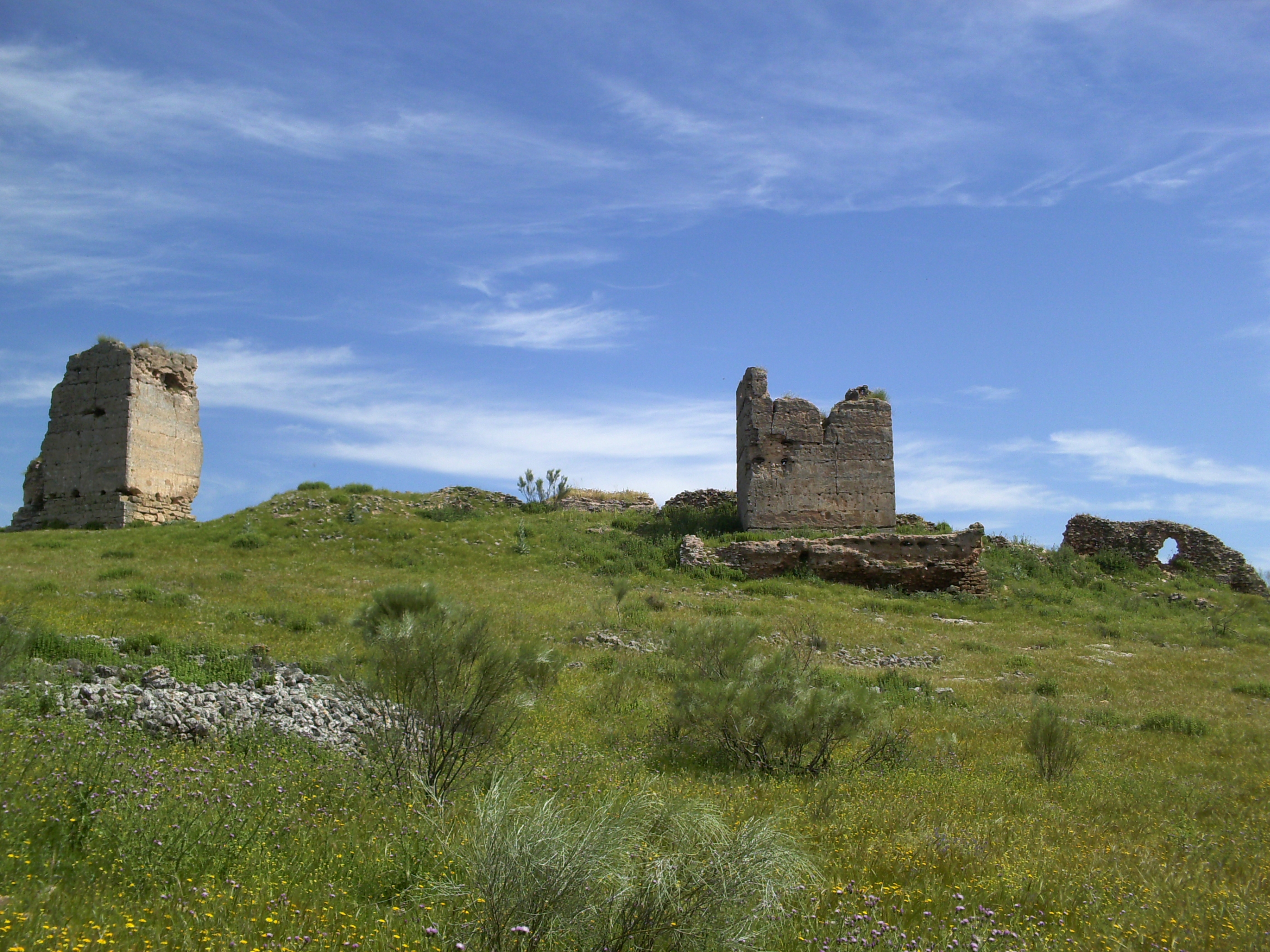
Giribaile Castle

Giribaile Castle is a ruined Spanish military fortification and Bienes de Interés Cultural landmark, built in the 12th century, during the etapa islámica. It situated in the vicinity of the village of Guadalén, in the town of jiennense de Vilches (Andalucía, España). It is situated on the northern edge of a plateau about 500 meters above sea level, visually controlling the valley of the río Guadalimar.

== Bibliography ==
- Valdecantos Dema, Rodrigo. CASTILLOS DE JAÉN: Descubre el pasado de una tierra fronteriza. ISBN 9788495244000
- Olivares Barragán, Francisco. CASTILLOS DE LA PROVINCIA DE JAÉN. C.S.I.C. Jaén, 1992. ISBN 84-87115-10-1
