= Baños de la Encina =

- Municipality
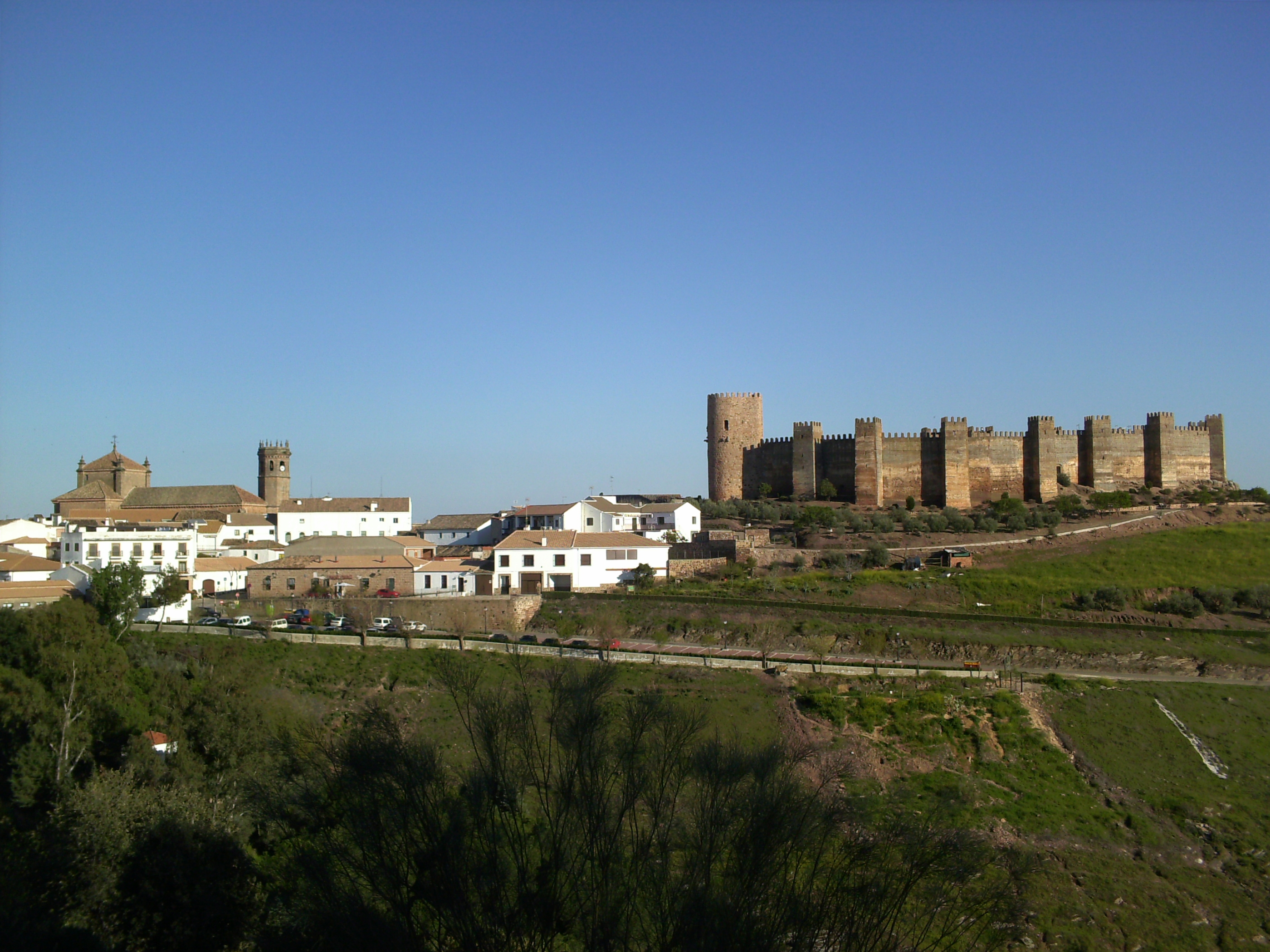
- View of Baños de la Encina with the Burgalimar Castle on the right

- Flag Coat of arms

- Location in the Province of Jaén Location in Andalusia Location in Spain
- Coordinates: 38°10′N 3°46′W
- Country: Spain
- Autonomous community: Andalusia
- Province: Jaén
- Comarca: Sierra Morena de Jaén

Area
  - Total: 392 km^{2} (151 sq mi)
- Elevation: 450 m (1,480 ft)

Population (2025-01-01)
  - Total: 2,542
  - Density: 6.48/km^{2} (16.8/sq mi)
- Time zone: UTC+1 (CET)
  - Summer (DST): UTC+2 (CEST)
- Website: bdelaencina.com

Baños de la Encina is a city located in the province of Jaén, Spain. According to 2024 INE figures, the city had a population of 2563 inhabitants. The 10th-century Umayyad era Burgalimar Castle is located on the southern edge of the town.

== See also ==
- List of municipalities in Jaén
