= Arc of San Lorenzo =

Coordinates: 37°46′17″N 3°47′44″W

- Arco de San Lorenzo (Spanish)
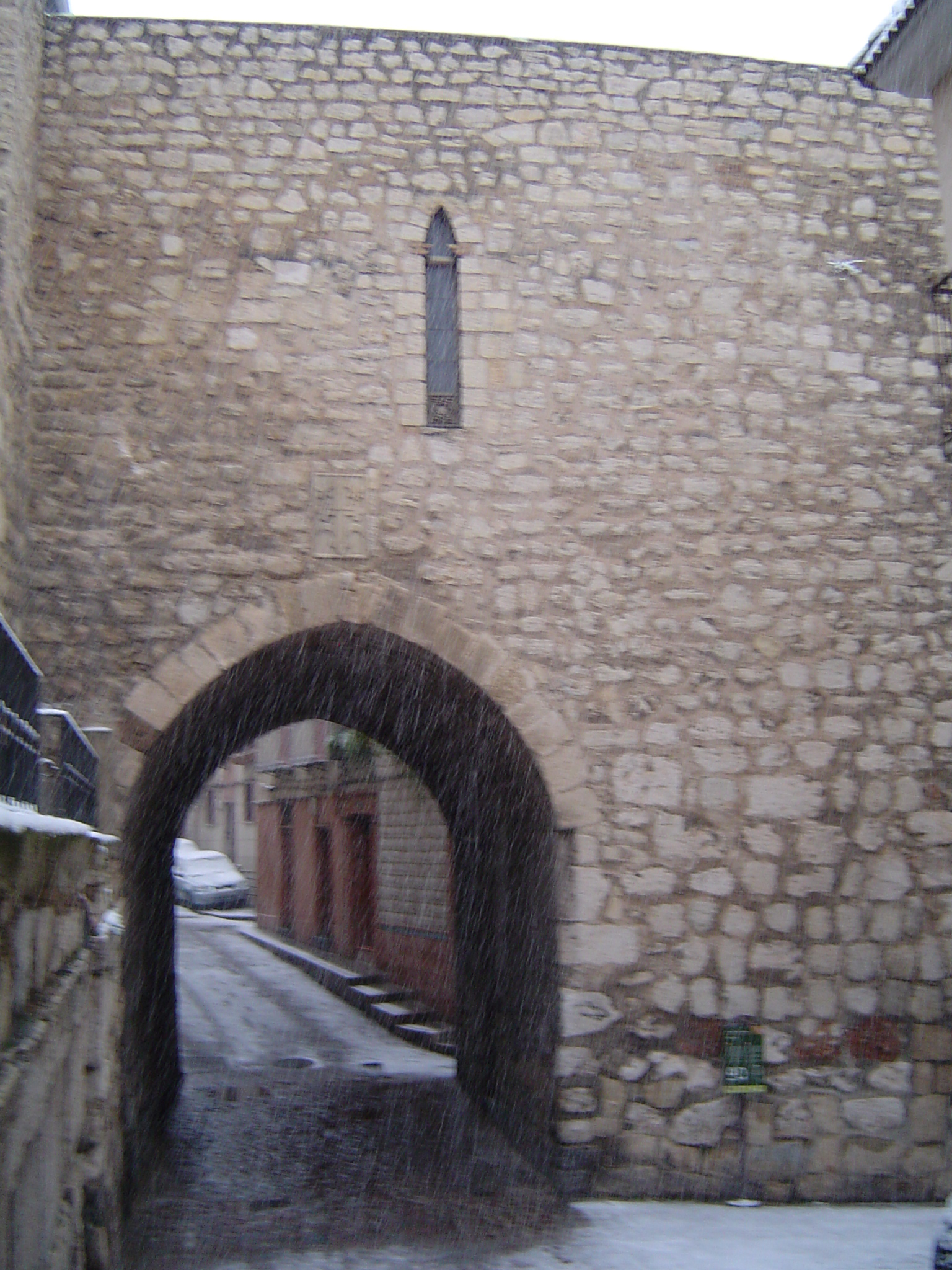

- Location within Spain
- Location: Jaén, Spain

Spanish Cultural Heritage
- Official name: Arco de San Lorenzo
- Type: Non-movable
- Criteria: Monument
- Designated: 1877
- Reference no.: RI-51-0000021

The Arc of San Lorenzo (Spanish: Arco de San Lorenzo) in Jaén, Spain is at the crossroads of the streets Almendros Aguilar and Madre de Dios ('Mother of God'). It is part of the former Church of San Lorenzo, built between the 13th and 14th centuries. Its interior houses Moorish tilework and paneling, as well as a small chapel. It is also home to an association called Amigos de San Antón ('Friends of Saint Anthony'). It was declared a Bien de Interés Cultural in 1877.

== History ==
It is said to be the place where the wake for Fernando IV "The Summoned", who died in Jaen on 17 September 1312, was held. For this reason, throughout the centuries prayers for the dead have been held in the arch during funerals for the city's bishops.

Maximiliano of Austria, the uncle of Carlos I, was baptized here on July 6, 1555.

Juan de Olid, the secretary of the Constable Miguel Lucas de Iranzo is buried in the arch. The small chapel served as the head of the Hospital de la Madre de Dios ('Mother of God Hospital'), founded in a nearby home in 1491 by Don Luis de Torres, the son of Constable Iranzo. It was also the first chapel of the Seminario Conciliar de Jaén ('Jaén Theological Seminary'), founded in 1620.

In 1825 the church of San Lorenzo collapsed due to neglect, leaving only the arch standing. The parish and its archives were moved to the Church of Saint Bartholomew (Spanish: la iglesia de San Bartolomé), and its artistic treasures were divided between the Church of Saint Bartholomew and the Church of La Merced.

It was declared a national monument in 1877 thanks to the work of a group of Jaén residents who obstructed a campaign for its complete demolition.

In 1969 the Dirección General de Bellas Artes began a restoration, which was headed by an architect from Jaen named Luis Berges Roldán.

== The old church ==
The church at 2-4 San Lorenzo Street has a single nave. It was noted for its objets d'art, including an All Souls Altarpiece, a panel of Saint Dominic and Saint Bartholomew of La Cuesta, and a painting on linen of Cristo de las Injurias, all housed in the nearby Church of La Merced.

== The chapel ==
The chapel is covered by brick vaulting in the center of which hangs a votive lamp from a plaster pendant. The entire wall of the chapel is covered by a Moorish tiled plinth. On the altar there is a lowered arch niche housing a crucifix on a red damask background. This niche is decorated with Moorish plasterwork that festoons the tile panels. On the two sides of the entrance an inscription in Gothic lettering reads: "This Chapel of Jesus of Nazareth is ... from the Mother of God Hospital" (Spanish: Esta capilla de Jesús Nazareno es ... del Hospital de la Madre de Dios).

== See also ==
- List of Bien de Interés Cultural in the Province of Jaén (Spain)
