= Andrés de Orbe y Larreategui =

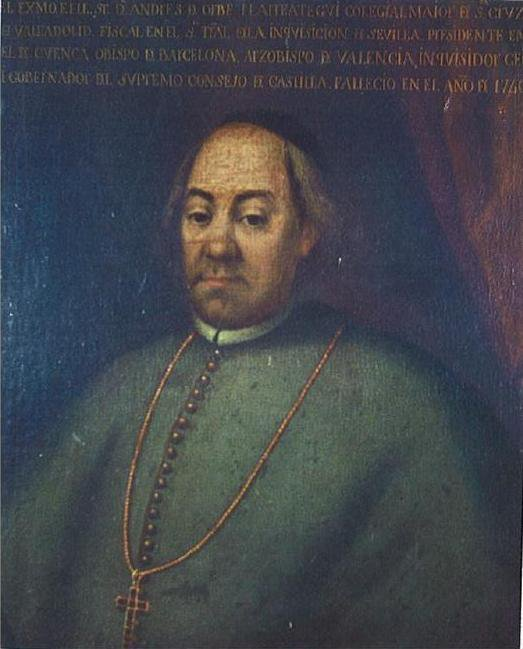
Andrés de Orbe y Larreategui

Andrés de Orbe y Larreategui was the Grand Inquisitor of Spain in 1733–1740, during the reign of Philip V of Spain. He later held the nunciature in Spain as a representative of the Roman Catholic Popes.

Orbe was appointed Bishop of Barcelona in 1720 and Archbishop of Valencia in 1725. He also held high positions in the State administration, including President of the Council of Castile between 1727 and 1733.

Philip V named Orbe Viscount of Santa Cruz in 1733 and Marquis of Valdespina in 1736. Orbe also built for his nephew, also Don Andrés, Valdespina Palace at Ermua, today the Town Hall.

== Sources ==
- Catholic Hierarchy

Catholic Church titles
Preceded by Juan de Camargo y Angulo	Grand Inquisitor of Spain; 1733–1740	Succeeded by Manuel Isidro Orozco Manrique de Lara
