= Juan de Camargo y Angulo =

Spanish bishop and Grand Inquisitor of Spain

Juan de Camargo y Angulo y Pasquer (1663–1733) was Bishop of Pamplona from 1716 to 1725 and Grand Inquisitor of Spain from 1720 to 1733.

== Biography ==
Juan de Camargo y Angulo y Pasquer was born in Ágreda on 30 June 1663.

He was appointed Bishop of Pamplona on 5 October 1716 and he was subsequently consecrated as a bishop on 18 December 1716. He was commissioned as Grand Inquisitor of Spain on 26 March 1720. Under his leadership, the Spanish Inquisition undertook its last major persecution of the marranos, with 93 people executed in 66 auto-da-fés between 1721 and 1725. He resigned as Bishop of Pamplona on 20 March 1725.

He died on 24 May 1733.

Catholic Church titles
Preceded by Diego de Astorga y Céspedes	Grand Inquisitor of Spain; 1720–1733	Succeeded by Andrés de Orbe y Larreategui
