= Castillo de Albanchez de Mágina =

Coordinates: 37.7901°N 3.4680°W

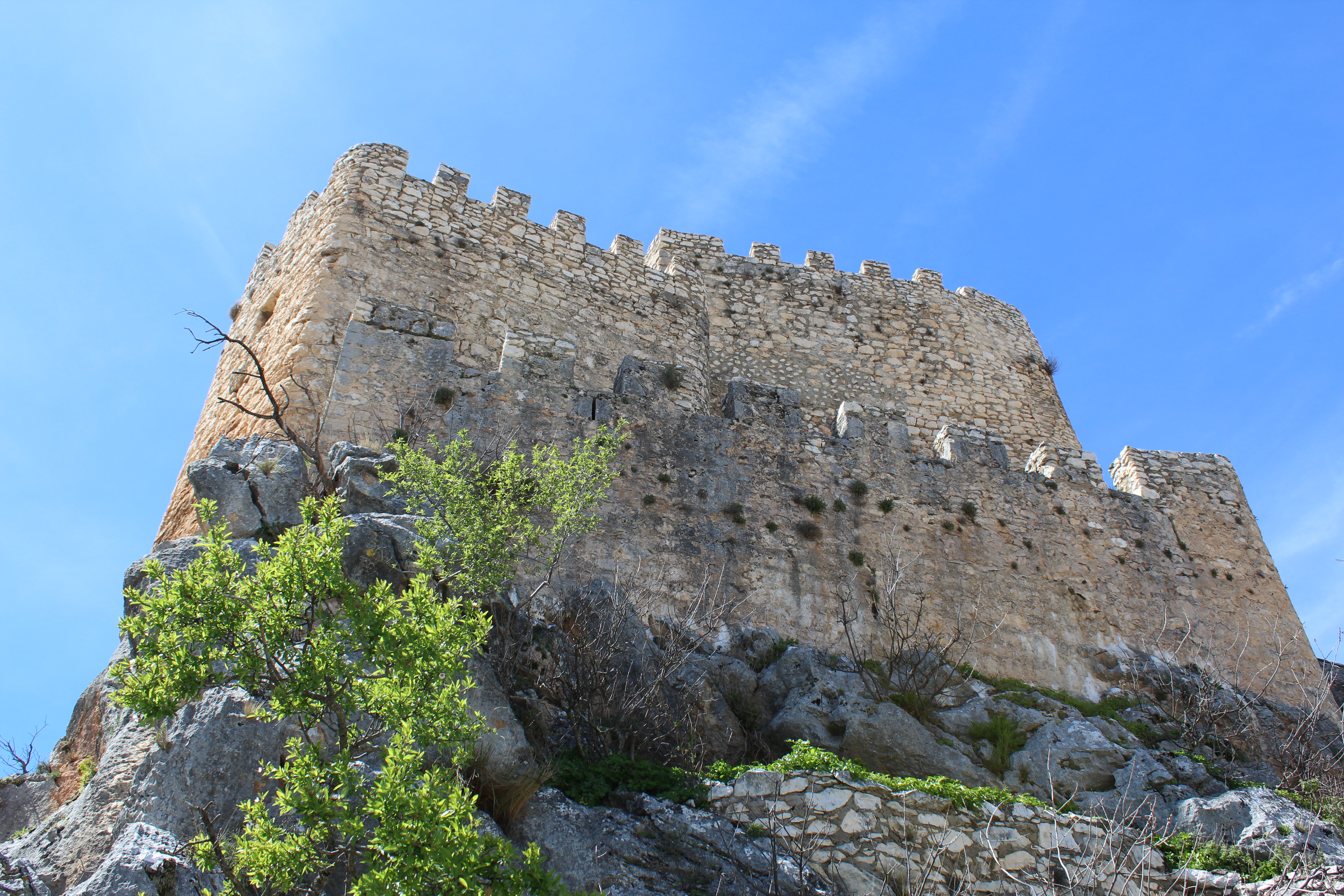
Albanchez de Mágina Castle

Albanchez de Mágina Castle is a Spanish fortification and Bien de Interés Cultural landmark in the Province of Jaén. It is located on the eastern slope of La Serrezuela, in Albanchez de Mágina in a very rugged area, at an elevation of 950 meters (3,120 ft), overlooking a large valley. While the exact date of construction is not known, some authors (Cerezo and Eslava) speculate it could date to the 14th century.

== Bibliography ==
- Ministerio de Cultura, Patrimonio Histórico
- Cerezo Moreno, Francisco; Eslava Galán, Juan (1989). Riquelme y Vargas, ed. Castillos y atalayas del Reino de Jaén.
- Olivares Barragán, Francisco (1992). Excma. Diputación Provincial. Instituto de Estudios Giennenses, ed. Castillo de la provincia de Jaén. pp. 35–45.
- López Pegalajar, Manuel (1994). Excma. Diputación Provincial. Instituto de Estudios Giennenses, ed. Aproximación al Patrimonio Monumental de Sierra Mágina: Castillos, Iglesias y Palacios.
- Salvatierra Cuenca, Vicente (1998). Albanchez de Úbeda: Villa fortificada. pp. 91–93.
- Salvatierra Cuenca, Vicente; Castillo Armenteros, Juan Carlos (1997). Castillo de Albanchez. p. 159.
