= Manuel Isidro Orozco Manrique de Lara =

Spanish bishop and Grand Inquisitor

- Archbishop of Santiago de Compostela
- Church: Catholic Church
- Archdiocese: Archdiocese of Santiago de Compostela
- In office: 5 May 1738 – 10 January 1745
- Predecessor: José del Yermo Santibáñez
- Successor: Cayetano Gil Taboada
- Previous post: Bishop of Jaén (1732-1738)

Orders
- Consecration: 5 October 1732 by Diego de Astorga y Céspedes

Personal details
- Born: 15 May 1681 Madrid, Kingdom of Castile, Crown of Castille
- Died: 10 January 1745 (aged 63)

Manuel Isidro Orozco Manrique de Lara (15 May 1681, Madrid – 10 January 1745) was a Spanish bishop who served as Grand Inquisitor of Spain from 1742 to 1745.

== Biography ==
Manuel Isidro Orozco Manrique de Lara was born in Madrid on 15 May 1681. He was appointed Bishop of Jaén on 21 July 1732, and was consecrated as a bishop by Cardinal Diego de Astorga y Céspedes on 5 October 1732. He was translated to the Archdiocese of Santiago de Compostela on 5 May 1738. He became Grand Inquisitor of Spain on 1 January 1742. He died on 10 January 1745.

Catholic Church titles
| Preceded by Andrés de Orbe y Larreategui | Grand Inquisitor of Spain; 1742–1745 | Succeeded by Francisco Pérez de Prado y Cuesta |
