= Iñigo Manrique de Lara (archbishop of Seville) =

Spanish Roman Catholic prelate

Most Reverend Iñigo Manrique de Lara
- Archbishop of Seville
- Church: Catholic Church
- Diocese: Archdiocese of Seville
- In office: 1483–1485
- Predecessor: Pedro González de Mendoza
- Successor: Diego Hurtado de Mendoza y Quiñones
- Previous posts: Bishop of Oviedo (1444–1457); Bishop of Coria (1457–1475); Bishop of Jaén (1475–1483)

Personal details
- Died: April 1485 Seville, Spain

Iñigo Manrique de Lara (died April 1485) was a Roman Catholic prelate who served as Archbishop of Seville (1483–1485), Bishop of Jaén (1475–1483), Bishop of Coria (1457–1475), and Bishop of Oviedo (1444–1457).

== Biography ==
He a son of Pedro Manrique de Lara y Mendoza, 8th Lord of Amusco, 3rd Lord of Treviño, and of Navarrete and Chief Magistrate of Castile. Íñigo was the brother of the poet Gómez Manrique and the uncle of Jorge Manrique, son of his brother Rodrigo Manrique and an other important Castilian poet. Another nephew of his, also named Íñigo Manrique de Lara, was Bishop of León (1484-1485) and of Córdoba (1485-1496).

In 1444, Iñigo Manrique de Lara was selected by the King of Spain and confirmed by Pope Eugene IV as Bishop of Oviedo. In 1457, he was appointed by Pope Callixtus III as Bishop of Coria. In 1475, he was appointed by Pope Sixtus IV as Bishop of Jaén. On 15 January 1483, he was appointed by Pope Sixtus IV as Archbishop of Seville where he served until his death in April 1485.

== See also ==
- Catholic Church in Spain

== External links and additional sources ==
- Cheney, David M. "Archdiocese of Oviedo". Catholic-Hierarchy.org. (for Chronology of Bishops)^{self-published}
- Chow, Gabriel. "Metropolitan Archdiocese of Oviedo". GCatholic.org. (for Chronology of Bishops)^{self-published}
- Cheney, David M. "Diocese of Jaén". Catholic-Hierarchy.org. (for Chronology of Bishops) ^{[self-published]}
- Chow, Gabriel. "Diocese of Jaén (Spain)". GCatholic.org. (for Chronology of Bishops) ^{[self-published]}
- Cheney, David M. "Diocese of Coria-Cáceres". Catholic-Hierarchy.org. (for Chronology of Bishops) ^{[self-published]}
- Chow, Gabriel. "Diocese of Coria-Caceres (Spain)". GCatholic.org. (for Chronology of Bishops) ^{[self-published]}
- Cheney, David M. "Archdiocese of Sevilla {Seville}". Catholic-Hierarchy.org. (for Chronology of Bishops) ^{[self-published]}
- Chow, Gabriel. "Metropolitan Archdiocese of Sevilla (Italy)". GCatholic.org. (for Chronology of Bishops) ^{[self-published]}

Catholic Church titles
Preceded by Diego Rapado	Bishop of Oviedo; 1444–1457	Succeeded by Rodrigo Sánchez de Arévalo
Preceded by Fernando López de Villaescusa	Bishop of Coria; 1457–1475	Succeeded by Francisco de Toledo
Preceded by Alfonso Vázquez de Acuña	Bishop of Jaén; 1475–1483	Succeeded by Luis Osorio
Preceded by Pedro González de Mendoza	Archbishop of Seville; 1483–1485	Succeeded by Diego Hurtado de Mendoza y Quiñones
