= Juan Falconi de Bustamante =

Spanish Mercedarian friar and mystical writer

Juan Falconi de Bustamante (April 1596 – 31 May 1638) was a Spanish Mercedarian friar, theologian, ascetic writer, preacher, and spiritual director associated with traditions of recollection and contemplative prayer in seventeenth-century Spanish Catholicism.

During his lifetime Falconi was known as a guide to prayer and promoter of frequent confession and communion. After his death, his writings became associated with the Quietist controversies because of their influence upon Miguel de Molinos. Modern scholarship, however, has generally distinguished Falconi’s contemplative theology from the more radical forms of passivism condemned in Quietism.

== Life ==
Falconi was born in Fiñana in April 1596. His father, also named Juan Falconi, served as alcalde mayor of Fiñana; his mother, María de Bustamante, belonged to an old family of Guadalajara. According to later accounts, Falconi received his First Communion in Granada at the age of six after preparation by a Jesuit priest.

In 1611 he entered the Order of Mercy, or Mercedarians, in Madrid. Some sources place his profession at the Convento de los Calzados, while others identify the Convento Grande de los Remedios, the same house in which Lope de Vega and Tirso de Molina also received the habit.

He studied arts at the Mercedarian monastery of Burceña in Biscay and theology at the University of Salamanca. He later taught in Mercedarian colleges at Segovia and Alcalá de Henares, where he acquired a reputation as an accomplished teacher and theologian.

Although praised as a teacher, Falconi was increasingly assigned by his superiors to apostolic work, especially preaching, hearing confessions, and spiritual direction. He exercised these ministries in Madrid among various social groups and became known at the courts of Philip III of Spain and Philip IV of Spain. His devotional teaching encouraged frequent confession, frequent communion, meditation, and continual preparation of the soul for eternal life.

Falconi’s spirituality reflected broader post-Tridentine Catholic concerns, especially sacramental devotion, moral reform, disciplined interior prayer, and eucharistic piety. According to Elías Gómez, Queen Elisabeth of France (wife of Philip IV) kept Falconi’s devotional manuals constantly with her.

Falconi published only one work during his lifetime, Cartilla para saber leer en Cristo (1635). Most of his other writings circulated first in manuscript and appeared in print only after his death.

== Spirituality and contemplative theology ==
Falconi belonged to the wider Spanish tradition of recogimiento ("recollection"), which emphasized interior silence, simplicity of prayer, attentiveness to the presence of God, and contemplative receptivity. Elías Gómez situates Falconi within a broad lineage of contemplative spirituality drawing upon writers such as Johannes Tauler, John of Ruusbroec, Louis of Blois, the Carthusians, and Spanish mystical traditions associated with Teresa of Ávila and John of the Cross.

Gómez argues that Falconi’s teaching on prayer emerged organically from earlier Mercedarian and Spanish contemplative traditions rather than constituting an isolated doctrinal innovation. He characterizes Falconi’s spirituality as a form of "contemplación imperfecta activa" and "oración de resignación", emphasizing recollection, interior stillness, simplification of acts, and loving adherence to God.

Falconi’s writings stressed recollection, the act of faith, abandonment to God, and the simplification of prayer. His spirituality belongs to the wider Catholic tradition of contemplative or "passive" prayer, in which the soul seeks receptivity before divine action rather than continuous discursive meditation.

Falconi’s emphasis upon simplicity of prayer and the "act of faith" later led some critics to associate him with contemplative passivity and the "one act" spirituality connected with Quietism. Modern historians, however, have cautioned against identifying these themes automatically with the later doctrinal system condemned as Quietism.

Bernard McGinn notes that Falconi’s writings showed relatively little interest in extraordinary mystical phenomena such as ecstasies or visions and instead emphasized simplicity, recollection, and interior attentiveness to God. Gómez similarly summarizes Falconi’s ideal of contemplation as "una quietud ocupada con los actos de fe y amor" ("a quiet occupied with acts of faith and love"), describing contemplation as a state in which the intellect continues to believe and the will continues to love even in silence and simplification.

Falconi’s practical and accessible literary style helped his works circulate widely among clergy, religious, and devout lay readers. McGinn situates Falconi within a broader early modern tradition of practical mystical "handbooks" intended to guide readers experientially into recollection and contemplative prayer.

Falconi also promoted frequent communion, a theme later important in modern Catholic eucharistic devotion.

== Relationship to Quietism ==
Falconi died in 1638, several decades before the condemnation of Miguel de Molinos and before Quietism had crystallized into a distinct theological controversy. Although Molinos later became the central figure of the Quietist controversy, Falconi’s own writings emerged from an earlier spiritual environment in which contemplative passivity and recollection had not yet become objects of systematic suspicion.

Molinos admired Falconi and drew heavily upon his writings on prayer and communion. McGinn’s annotations to Molinos’s Spiritual Guide identify numerous direct borrowings from Falconi’s Camino derecho para el cielo and Segunda cartilla, especially concerning recollection, interior quiet, simplification of prayer, and contemplative "leisure" (ocio).

According to McGinn, Molinos defended a conception of contemplative ocio that involved subtle but genuine interior spiritual activity rather than absolute passivity, a conception derived partly from Falconi and earlier Spanish traditions of recollection. Later anti-Quietist polemic often interpreted Falconi retrospectively through the lens of Molinos’s condemnation, though modern historians have emphasized important differences between Falconi’s spirituality and the doctrines formally condemned as Quietism.

Falconi himself was never formally condemned during his lifetime. However, after the condemnation of Molinos in 1687, several editions and translations of Falconi’s writings were placed on the Index Librorum Prohibitorum amid broader ecclesiastical suspicion toward contemplative passivity and "prayer of quiet".

In 1688 Italian translations of Cartilla para saber leer en Cristo, Cartilla segunda para leer en Cristo, and two letters of spiritual direction were formally prohibited.

== Reception and historiography ==
Falconi’s writings circulated widely outside Spain during the seventeenth century, especially in Italy and France. Italian translations of his Cartillas became particularly influential before their condemnation in 1688.

Robert Ricard observed that Falconi’s reputation in France became heavily shaped by later anti-Quietist polemic, but that this interpretation was substantially revised during the twentieth century through the studies of Elías Gómez and André Derville.

Twentieth-century and twenty-first-century scholarship has increasingly emphasized the diversity of early modern Catholic mystical traditions and drawn sharper distinctions between contemplative theology and the later doctrinal formulations condemned as Quietism. André Derville’s article on Falconi in the Dictionnaire de spiritualité contributed significantly to the reassessment of Falconi’s place within Catholic spiritual theology.

Evelyn Underhill later grouped Falconi among contemplative writers whom she believed had been unjustly associated with Quietism.

McGinn situates Falconi within the broader "crisis of mysticism" in seventeenth-century Catholic Europe, in which traditions of contemplative prayer, recollection, and simplified interiority increasingly came under theological and institutional suspicion.

== Beatification process and reception ==
Soon after Falconi’s death, a process for his beatification was opened. Several witnesses, including Aldonza de Castilla, praised his sanctity and spiritual wisdom. The cause did not advance, in part because of suspicions surrounding his emphasis on contemplative passivity and the act of faith.

Despite these controversies, Falconi’s works continued to circulate throughout the seventeenth and eighteenth centuries. Some writings appeared only long after his death. Camino derecho para el cielo, for example, was first published in 1783.

== Legacy ==
Modern scholarship increasingly treats Falconi as an important figure in the history of early modern Catholic contemplative spirituality, especially within traditions of recollection, eucharistic devotion, practical mystical direction, and passive prayer.

== Works ==
- Cartilla para saber leer en Cristo (1635) – Devotional and contemplative manual emphasizing interior recollection and spiritual reading centred upon Christ.
- Cartilla segunda para leer en Cristo (1651) – Continuation of the earlier Cartilla, further developing Falconi’s teachings on contemplative prayer.
- La Vida de Dios (1656) – Originally a private spiritual letter written on 23 July 1628 to one of Falconi’s spiritual daughters.
- El Sacro Monumento (1657)
- Obras espirituales (1660)
- El pan nuestro de cada día sobre la comunión (1661) – Eucharistic devotional work advocating frequent communion; regarded by some scholars as Falconi’s principal work.
- Preparación de la misa
- Camino derecho para el cielo – Ascetical and contemplative guide to the spiritual life; first published posthumously in 1783.
- Cómo se han de encaminar todas las acciones a Dios – Now lost.
- Defensa ante la Inquisición del Comendador F. Pedro Franco de Guzmán

== See also ==
- Quietism
- Miguel de Molinos
- Prayer of quiet
- Christian contemplation
- Teresa of Ávila
- John of the Cross
- François Malaval
- Frequent Communion
- Spanish mysticism
