= Luis Osorio =

Most Reverend Luis Osorio
- Bishop of Jaén
- Church: Catholic Church
- Diocese: Diocese of Jaén
- In office: 1483–1496
- Predecessor: Iñigo Manrique de Lara (archbishop)
- Successor: Diego de Deza

Personal details
- Died: 1496 Jaén, Spain

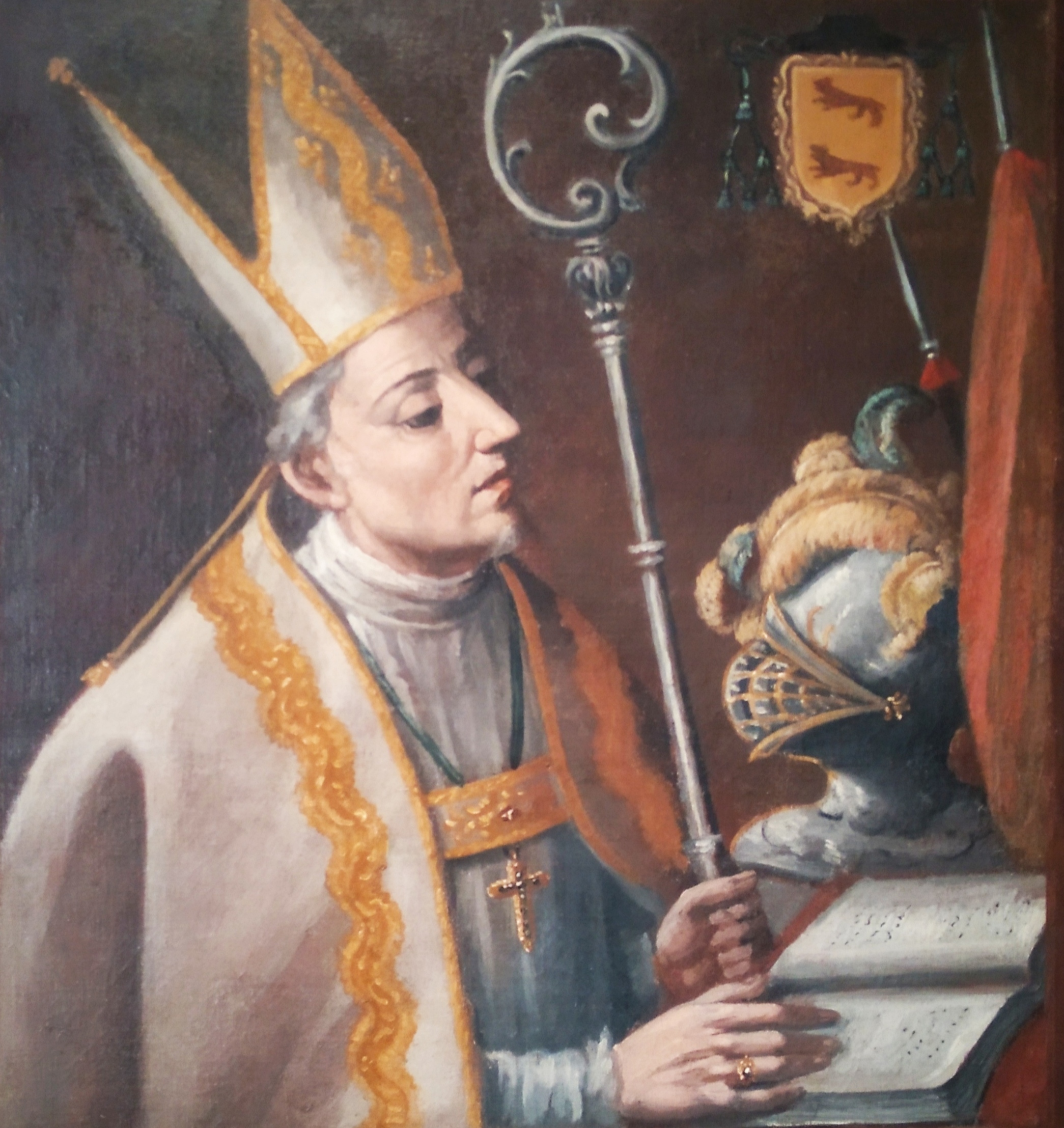

Luis Osorio (died 1496) was a Roman Catholic prelate who served as Bishop of Jaén (1483–1496).

== Biography ==
In 1483, Luis Osorio was appointed during the papacy of Pope Sixtus IV as Bishop of Jaén. He served as Bishop of Jaén until his death in 1496.

== External links and additional sources ==
- Cheney, David M. "Diocese of Jaén". Catholic-Hierarchy.org. (for Chronology of Bishops) ^{[self-published]}
- Chow, Gabriel. "Diocese of Jaén (Spain)". GCatholic.org. (for Chronology of Bishops) ^{[self-published]}

Catholic Church titles
Preceded by Iñigo Manrique de Lara (archbishop)	Bishop of Jaén; 1483–1496	Succeeded by Diego de Deza
