= Castillo de Alcaudete =

Castle in Alcaudete, Spain

Coordinates: 37.59056°N 4.08852°W

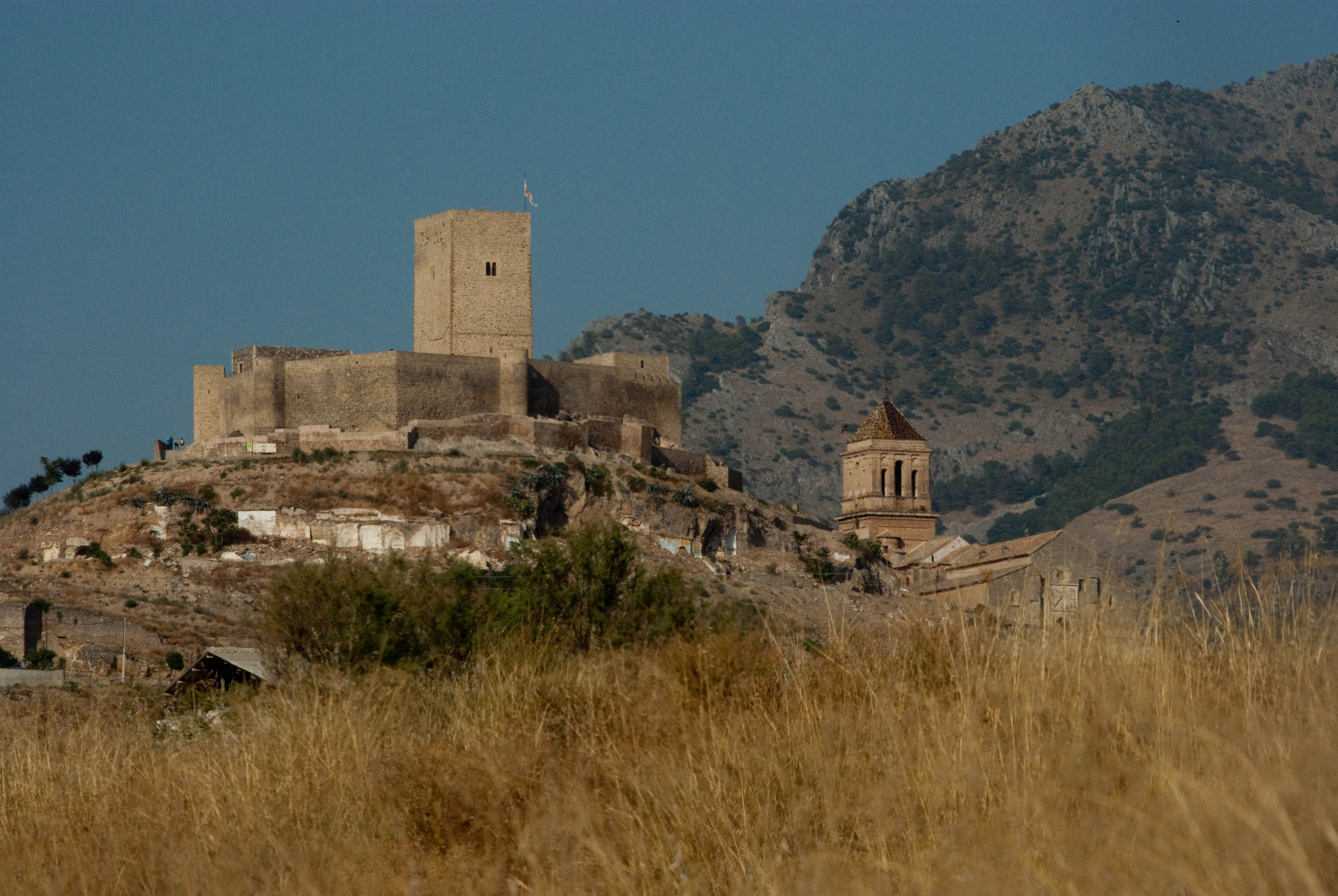
Castillo de Alcaudete

Castillo de Alcaudete is a castle in Alcaudete, in the province of Jaén, Spain. The castle was built by the Arabs over the remains of a previous Roman fortification and taken by the Christians in 1085 during the reign of Alfonso VI. For almost three hundred years thereafter, the castle kept changing hands until 1340 when the Christians took it over. The design is polygon in shape, adjusted to the terrain escarpments. The structure is surmounted by six towers, including the Tower of Homage, which has a door on the north side, guarded by two additional towers. The castle is restored and in good condition. It was declared a Bien de Interés Cultural monument in 1949.
