= Burgalimar Castle =

Castle in Baños de la Encina, Jaén Province, Spain

Coordinates: 38°10′12.6″N 3°46′31.8″W

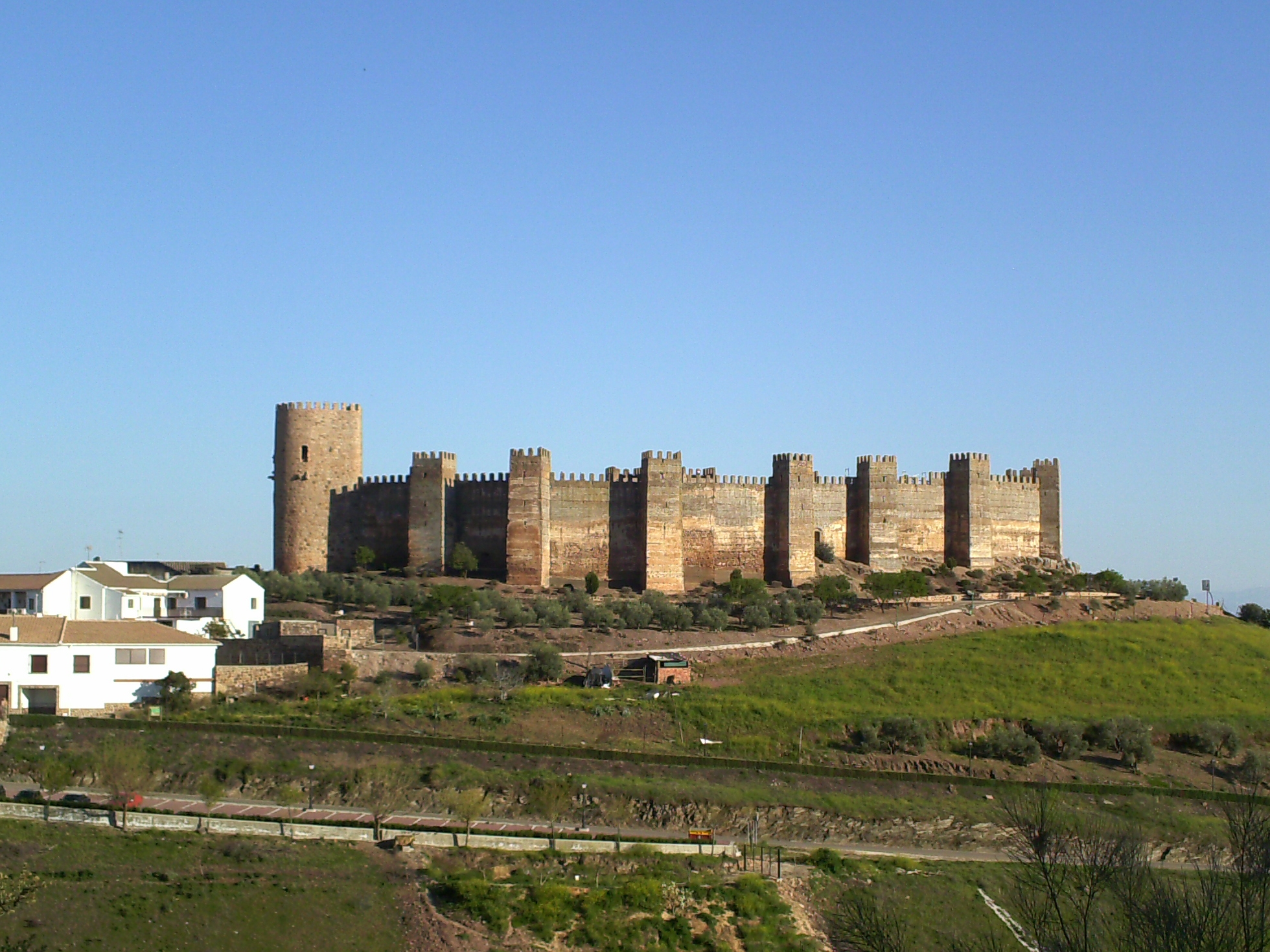
Burgalimar Castle seen from afar

Burgalimar Castle (Spanish: Castillo de Burgalimar) is a historic castle in the town of Baños de la Encina, Jaén Province, Spain. It was built in the 10th century under the rule of the Umayyad Caliphate of Córdoba.

== History ==
A marble inscription plaque found at the entrance of the castle records the date of its construction as 967 AD (357 AH), during the reign of the caliph Al-Hakam II, who is also named in the inscription. The marble plaque is now kept at the National Archaeological Museum in Madrid. The castle was built as a military base and garrison to defend the valley of the Guadalquivir River and the roads to and from the capital city of Córdoba.

In the 12th and 13th centuries, during the Reconquista, the castle changed hands multiple times between the Muslim rulers of al-Andalus and the Christian kingdoms to the north. Alfonso VII captured it in 1147 but it returned to Muslim control after his death in 1157. Alfonso VIII and Alfonso IX together captured it again for a time in 1189. It was captured by the Kingdom of Castile in 1212, shortly before the Battle of Las Navas de Tolosa, but returned to Almohad control three days after the battle. The castle was definitively conquered by Castile in 1225, when it conquered the surrounding region. The Castilians later added a keep tower called the Torre del Homenaje ("Tower of Homage") in 1466.

It was designated a National Monument of Spain in 1931.

== Description ==
The castle consists of a large walled enclosure, of elongated but irregular shape, measuring roughly 100 meters long and 50 meters wide. Fifteen towers stand at close intervals around the perimeter. All the towers have a square or rectangular base, which was typical of caliphal fortresses in the 10th century, except for the northernmost tower, the 15th-century Torre del Homenaje, which is larger and has a semi-round profile. There are two entrance gates: one in the north and one in the south/southeast. The more important southern gate consists of a straight passage (instead of the bent entrance common in later fortifications) with horseshoe arches, set between two towers. Chambers were located above the passage with slots in the floor where missiles could be thrown down onto attackers. Inside the castle today are the remains of a cistern and the foundations of later buildings.

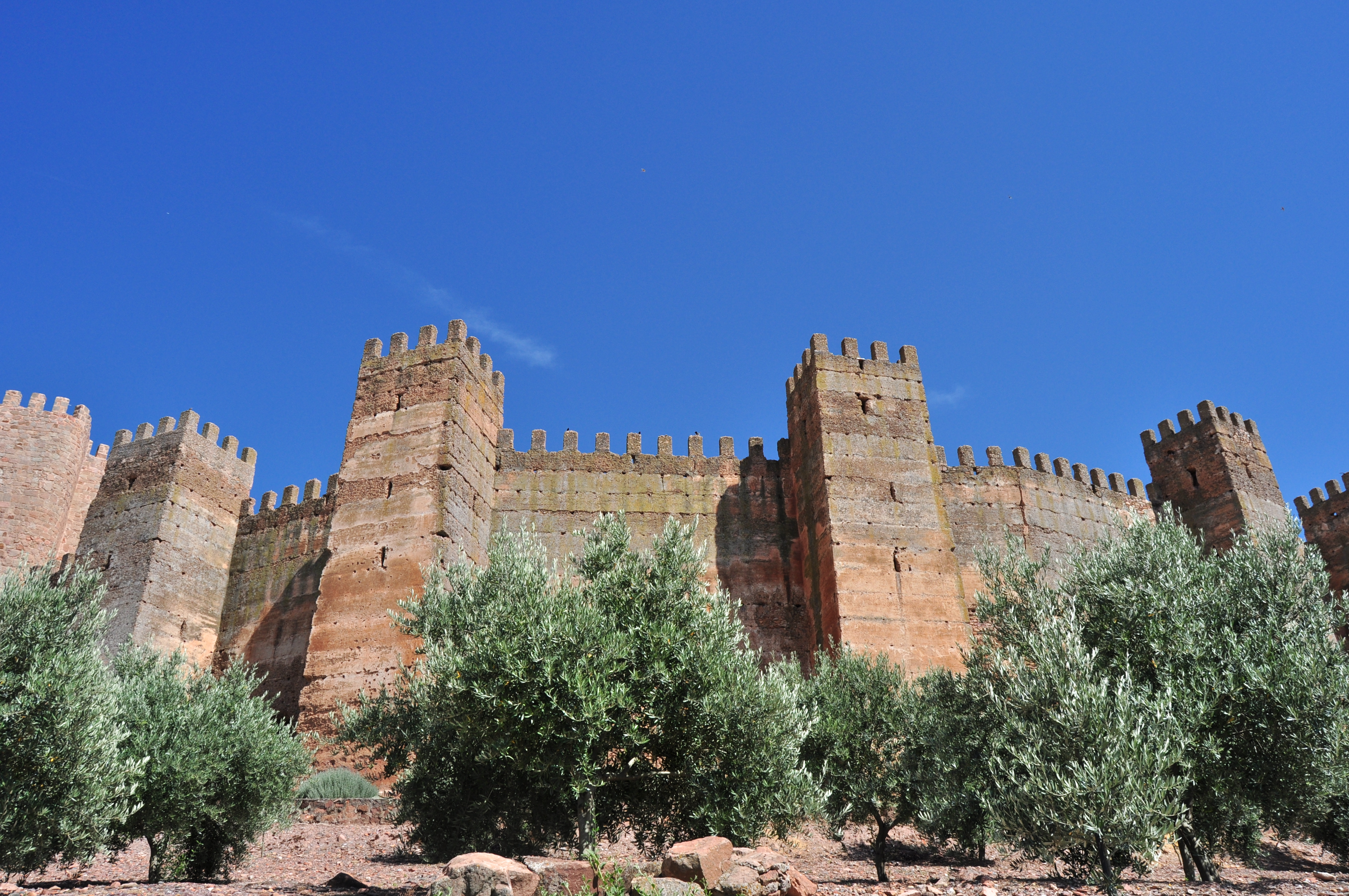
Exterior view of the walls

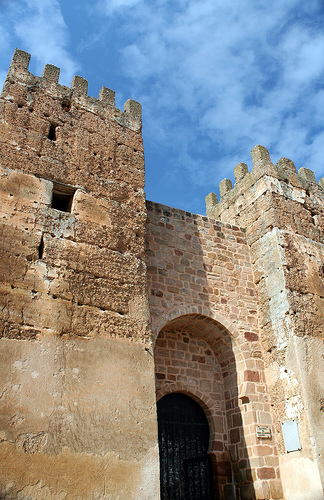
The southern gate of the castle

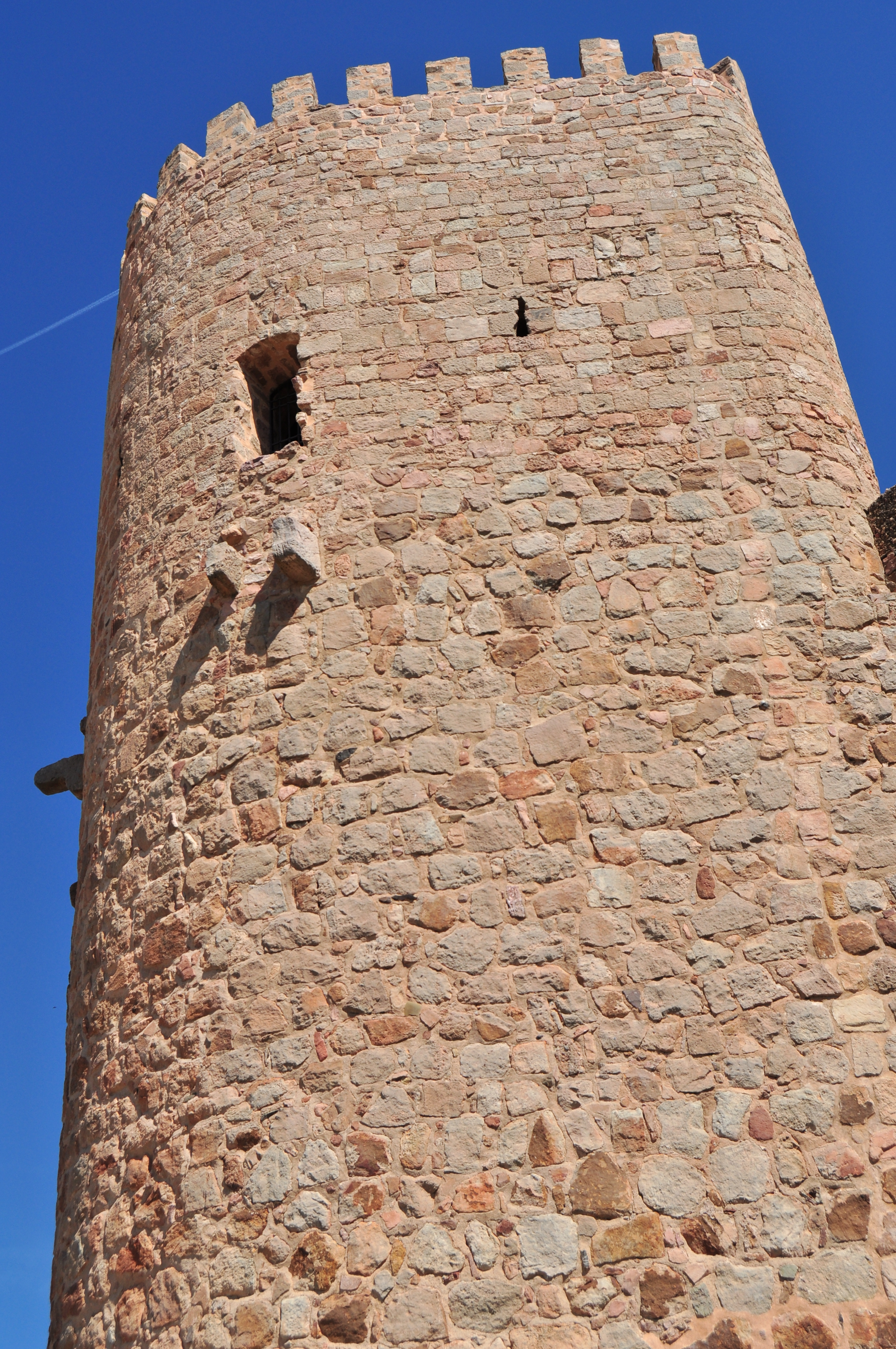
The Torre del Homenaje

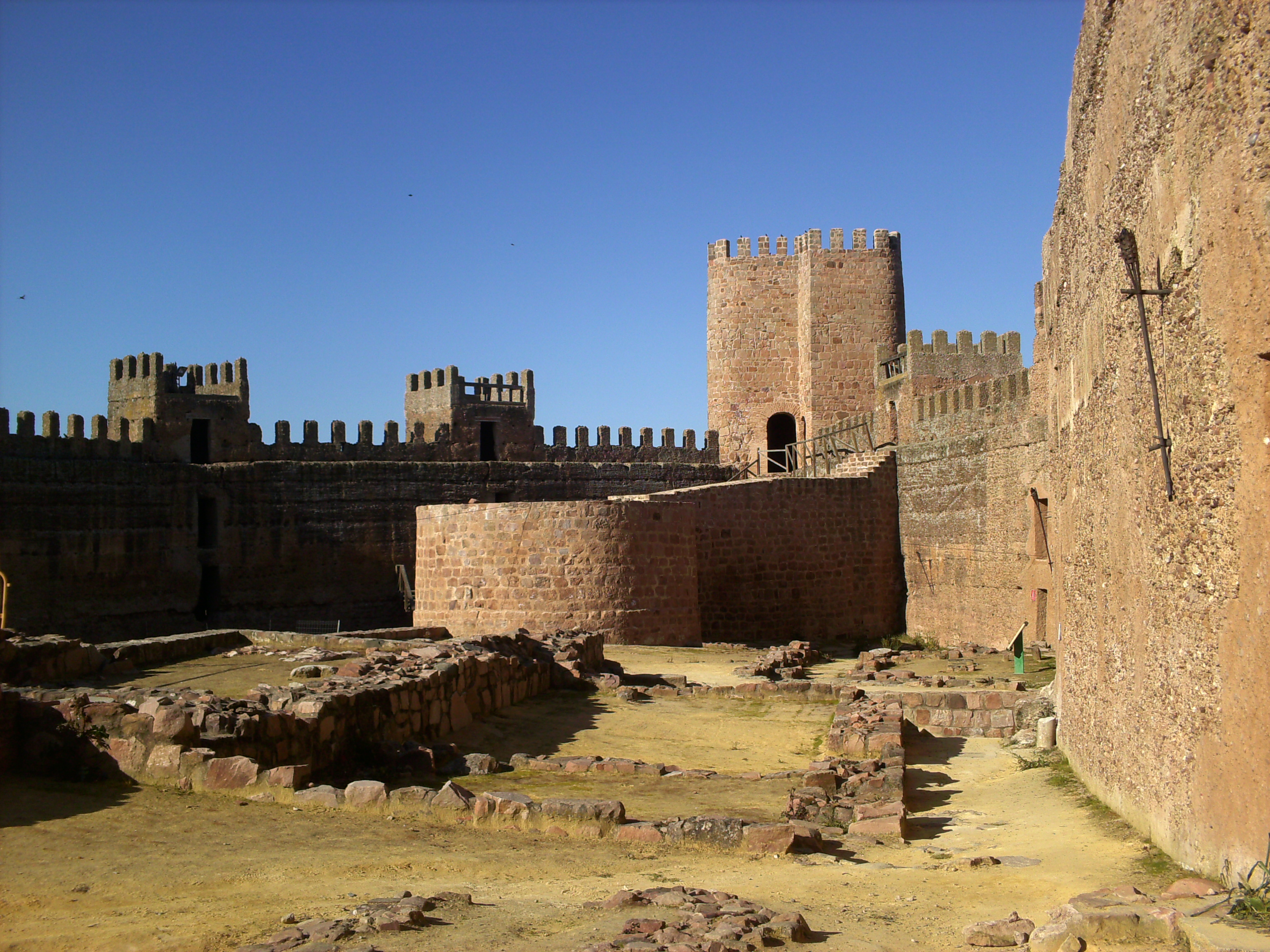
The castle's interior, with remains of some later structures
