= Peter Pascual =

Mozarabic theologian, bishop and martyr

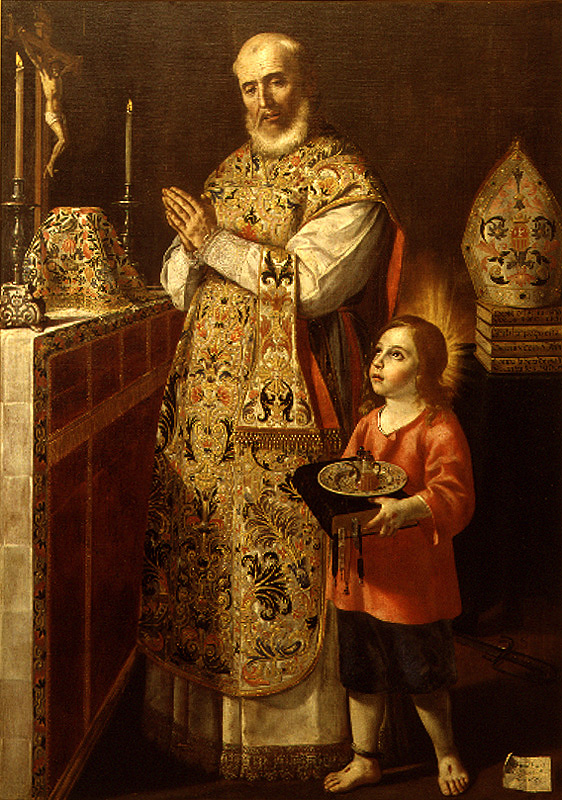
Misa de San Pedro Pascual, oil on canvas, Jerónimo Jacinto Espinosa (1660), today in the Museo de Bellas Artes de Valencia

Peter Pascual (c. 1227 – 1299/1300), in Latin originally Petrus Paschasius (Spanish: Pedro Pascual, Valencian : Pere Pasqual), was a Mozarabic theologian, bishop, and martyr. His very existence has been called into question by recent scholarship.

Born in Valencia under the Almohads, he went to the University of Paris in 1238, shortly before Valencia fell to James I of Aragon. He may have held a canonry at the Cathedral of Saint Mary in Valencia before 1250, when he resigned it to join the Mercedarians at Rome. He later served James I as a tutor to his son Sancho, whom he also served as an assistant during the latter's archiepiscopate at Toledo. He became a wide-ranging preacher, delivering sermons in Tuscany and Andalusia, and writing tracts on various theological controversies. The authenticity of many works attributed to him is suspect, and it is possible that there were two writers of the same name.

In 1296 he was appointed Bishop of Jaén, but was captured by the Kingdom of Granada and held captive for three years before being beheaded at Granada. He is listed in the Roman Martyrology on October 23.

During his imprisonment, the blessed composed a refutation of the Koran and a defence of the Catholic faith against the attacks of the Muslims and Jews.
