= Francisco Sarmiento Mendoza =

Spanish canon lawyer and Catholic bishop (1525–1595)

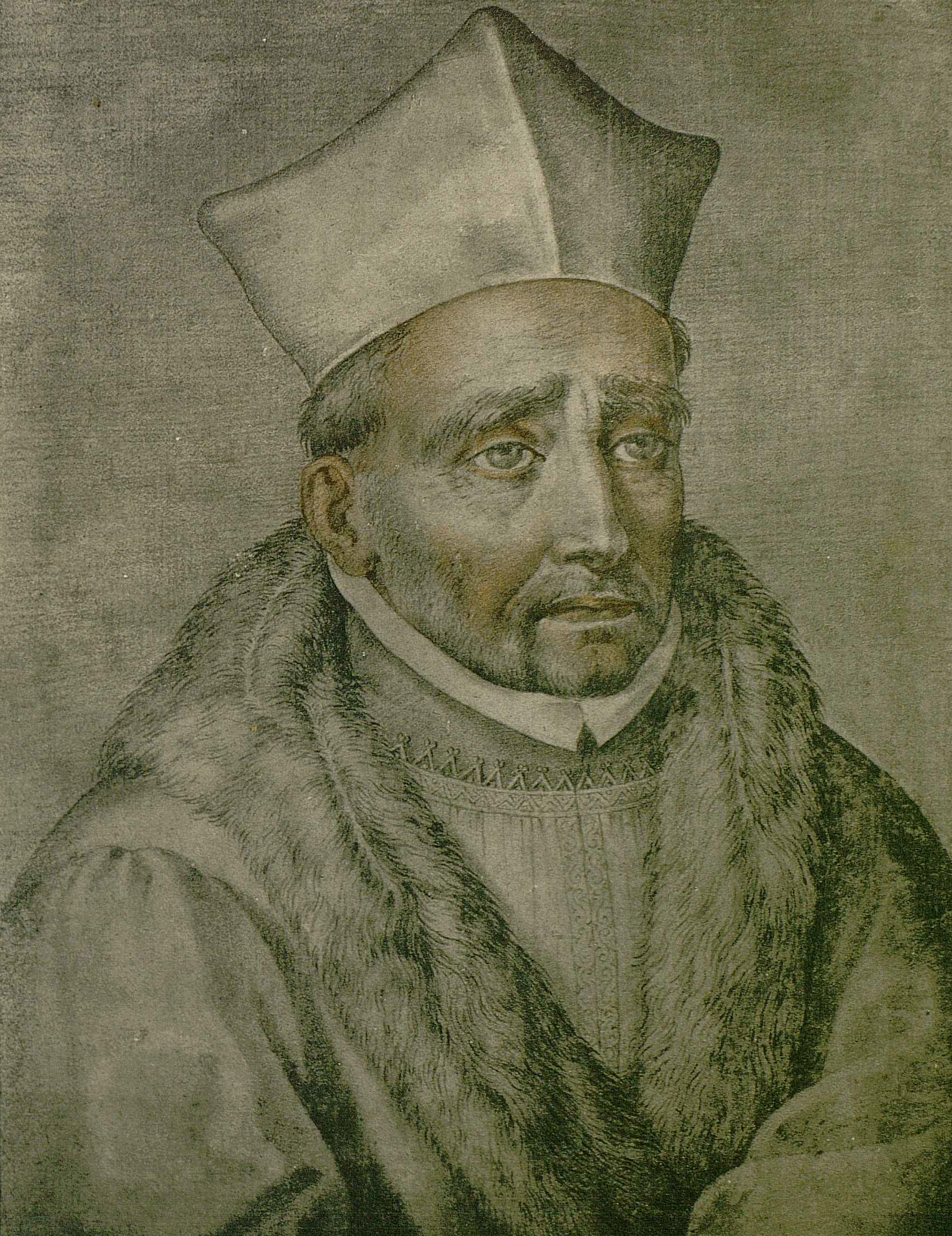
Francisco Sarmiento de Mendoza

Francisco Sarmiento de Mendoza (10 July 1525 in Burgos – 9 June 1595 in Jaén) was a Spanish canon lawyer and Catholic bishop.

== Life ==
Mendoza was born into a noble family at Burgos. At the age of 21 years he already occupied a professorial chair in canon law at Salamanca. After being auditor for six years at Valladolid, he was appointed Auditor of the Rota in Rome, and held this office for twelve years.

In 1574 he became Bishop of Astorga; he was transferred to the See of Jaén in 1580. He died at Jaén.

== Works ==
Among his works on canon law are "Selectarum interpretationum libri VIII" (Rome, 1571, Burgos, 1573, 1575, Antwerp, 1616), and "De redditibus eccleciasticis" (Rome, 1569, Burgos, 1573, 1575). In the latter, which is dedicated to Pope Pius V, he argues against Martin Azpilcueta, that clerics are not bound in justice, but only in charity, to give to the poor that part of their revenues which is not necessary for their own sustenance. His complete works were published in three volumes (Antwerp, 1616).
