= Basílica de Santa María de los Reales Alcázares =

Coordinates: 38.0217°N 3.6230°W

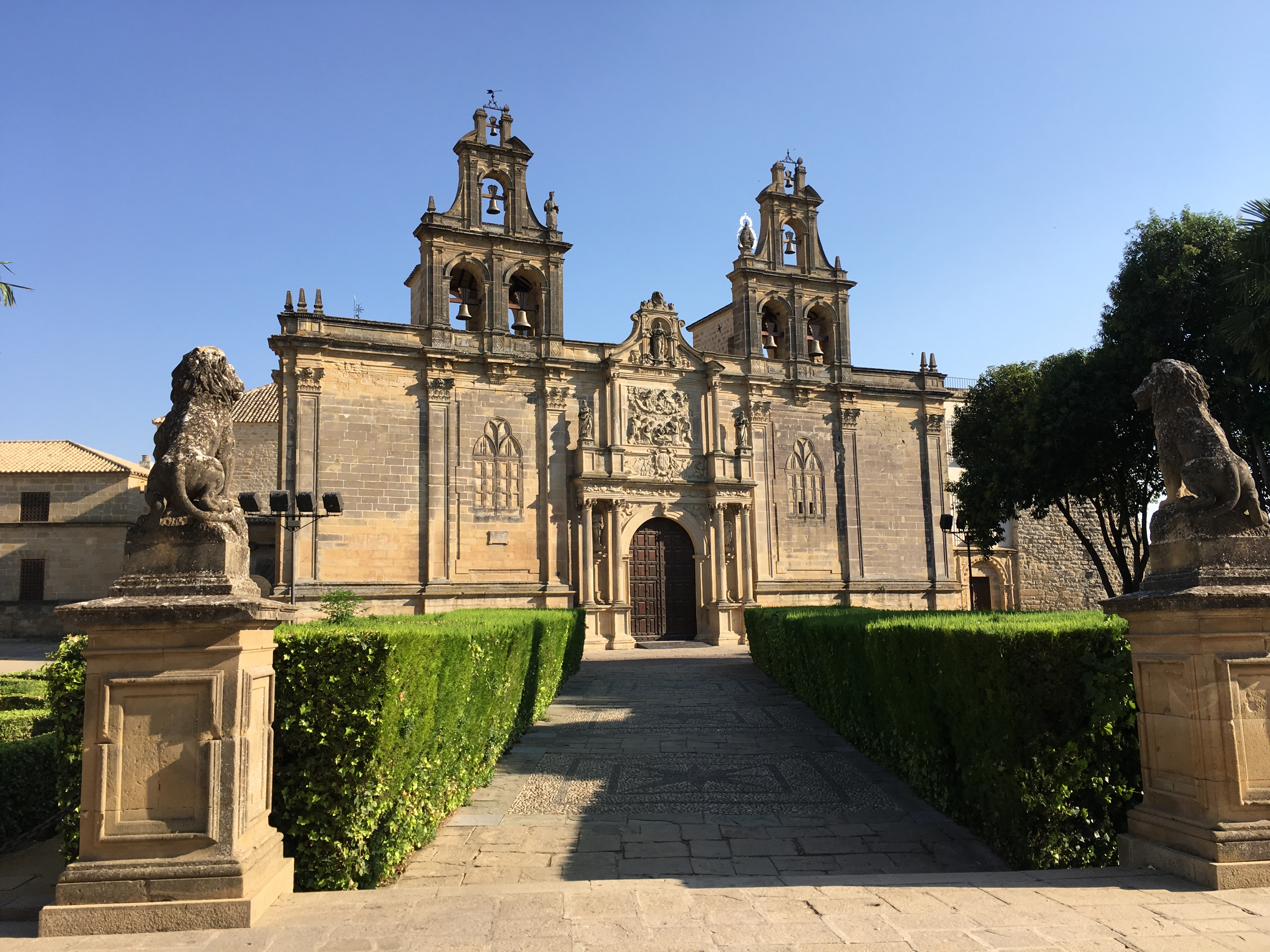
Basílica y Real Colegiata de Santa María la Mayor de los Reales Alcázares de Úbeda

Basílica y Real Colegiata de Santa María la Mayor de los Reales Alcázares de Úbeda is a Spanish national monument. The Bien de Interés Cultural landmark, is the main church in Úbeda, Jaén, located in the Vázquez de Molina Square, opposite the Vázquez de Molina Palace. The basilica forms part of the UNESCO World Heritage Site which was declared a monument in 2003.

== Bibliography ==
- Arsenio Moreno, Úbeda Renacentista, Madrid: Electa, 1993.
- Antonio Almagro, Santa Maria De Los Reales Alcazares De Ubeda: Arqueología, Historia y Arte, Úbeda: El Olivo, 2003.
- Almansa Moreno, José Manuel. Guía completa de Úbeda y Baeza. Úbeda: Editorial El Olivo, 2005.
