= Louis of Blois =

Louis of Blois can refer to:

- Louis I, Count of Blois (1172–1205), Count of Blois and participant in the Fourth Crusade
- Louis II, Count of Blois (died 1346), Count of Blois and lord of Avesnes
- Louis III, Count of Blois (died 1372), Count of Blois and lord of Avesnes
- Louis de Blois (1506–1566), French mystical writer
