= Diego de Astorga y Céspedes =

Spanish Cardinal

His Eminence Diego de Astorga y Céspedes
- Cardinal, Archbishop of Toledo; Primate of Spain
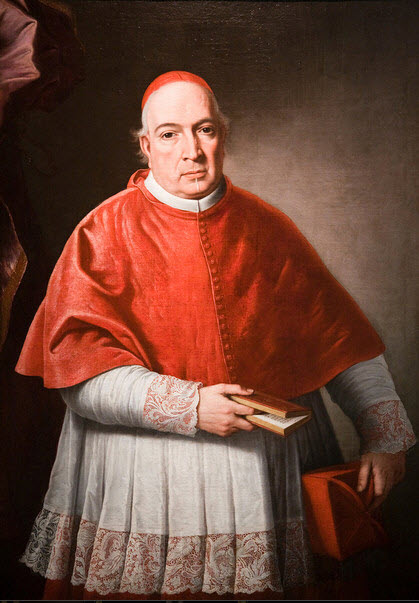
- Portrait by Alonso Miguel de Tovar
- Church: Roman Catholic
- Archdiocese: Toledo
- See: Cathedral of Saint Mary of Toledo
- Installed: 22 July 1720
- Term ended: 9 February 1734
- Predecessor: Francisco Valero y Losa
- Successor: Position vacant
- Other posts: Bishop of Barcelona; Vicar-General of Ceuta

Orders
- Ordination: 17 December 1689
- Consecration: 14 June 1716 by Luis Antonio Belluga y Moncada
- Created cardinal: 26 November 1727 by Pope Benedict XIII

Personal details
- Born: 17 October 1663 Gibraltar, Kingdom of Spain
- Died: 9 February 1734 (aged 70) Madrid, Kingdom of Spain
- Education: University of Granada

Diego de Astorga y Céspedes (17 October 1663 – 9 February 1734) was a Spanish Cardinal of the Roman Catholic Church. He also served as Bishop of Barcelona, Archbishop of Toledo and Grand Inquisitor.

== Biography ==
Diego de Astorga y Céspedes was born in Gibraltar, then a Spanish town. He obtained a degree on Canon law at the University of Granada and was ordained in 1689. In 1705, he was appointed General Vicar of Ceuta (as the bishop, Vidal Marín del Campo, had been named Grand Inquisitor) and Inquisitor of the kingdom of Murcia in 1710. He was consecrated as Bishop of Barcelona in 1716, being the first non-Catalan priest to serve as bishop in Barcelona, due to the abolition of the provisos on foreign bishops in Catalonia by the Nueva Planta decrees, issued by Philip V of Spain after the defeat of the pro-Austrian side in the War of the Spanish Succession.

Four years later, in 1720, he was consecrated as Archbishop of Toledo and therefore Primate of Spain. He was also appointed Grand Inquisitor (although he resigned the same year). In 1727, he was created Cardinal by Pope Benedict XIII. However, he never received the red hat and the title and did not participate in the 1730 conclave, which elected Pope Clement XII. He was also a member of the Privy council of the king Philip V after his abdication to his son Louis I.

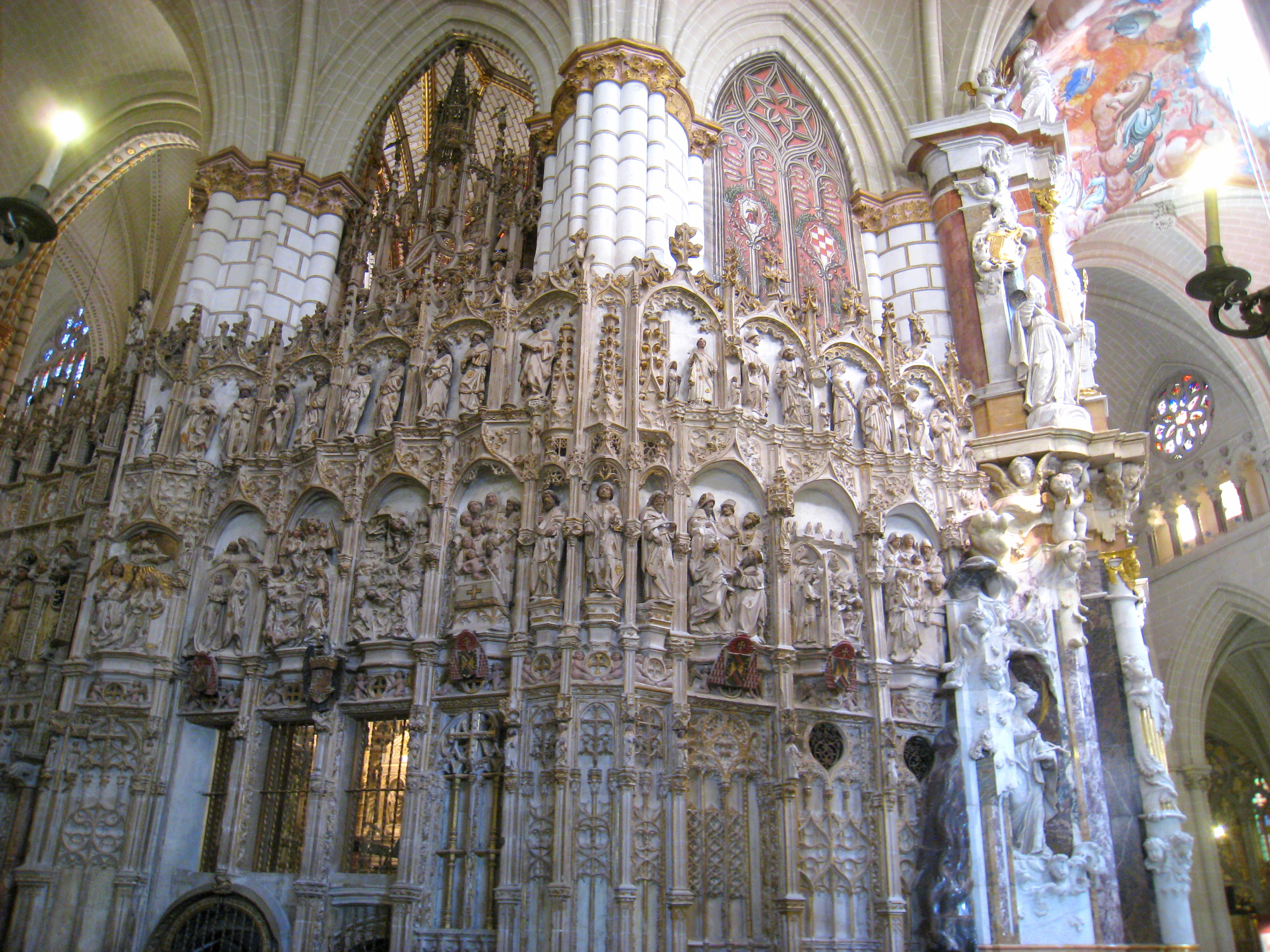
Transparente of the Cathedral of Toledo, side view.

He ordered the crafting of El Transparente of the Cathedral of Toledo to Narciso Tomé, an example of the intricate Spanish Baroque set behind the main altar of the main chapel (the chapel of the Santísimo Sacramento). The Bishop wished to mark the presence of the Holy Sacrament with a glorious monument, which cost 200,000 ducats and was the cause of great enthusiasm, even with a poem wherein the monument was acclaimed 'the Eighth Wonder of the World'.

Cardinal Astorga y Céspedes died in 1734 in Madrid and is buried at the feet of El Transparente in the cathedral of Toledo.

During his whole career, Bishop De Astorga y Céspedes promoted the devotion to Our Lady of Europe, the devotion title given to the Blessed Virgin Mary in Gibraltar.

Catholic Church titles
Preceded by Francisco Valero Losa	Archbishop of Toledo; 1720–1735	Succeeded by Luis Antonio Fernández de Córdoba Portocarrero Guzmán y Aguilar
Preceded by Francesco del Giudice	Grand Inquisitor of Spain; 1720	Succeeded by Juan de Camargo y Angulo
