= Begíjar =

Begíjar, Spain
- city
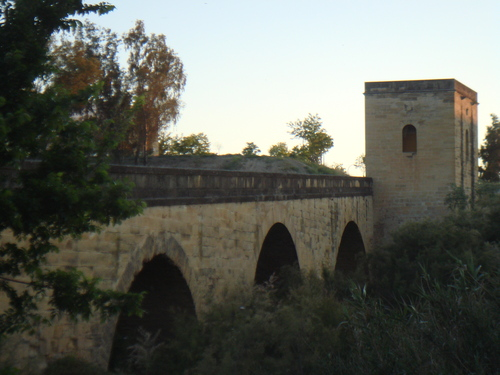

- Coat of arms

- Location in the Province of Jaén Begíjar (Andalusia) Begíjar (Spain)
- Coordinates: 37°59′N 3°32′W
- Country: Spain
- Autonomous community: Andalusia
- Province: Jaén
- Municipality: Begíjar

Area
  - Total: 43 km^{2} (17 sq mi)
- Elevation: 565 m (1,854 ft)

Population (2025-01-01)
  - Total: 2,908
  - Density: 68/km^{2} (180/sq mi)
- Time zone: UTC+1 (CET)
  - Summer (DST): UTC+2 (CEST)

Begíjar is a town located in the Andalusian province of Jaén, Spain. According to 2021 INE figures, the town had a population of 2,998.

== See also ==
- List of municipalities in Jaén
