= Rodrigo Sánchez de Arévalo =

Spanish churchman, historian and political theorist

Rodrigo Sánchez de Arévalo (Latin: Rodericus Zamorensis; Santa María la Real de Nieva, diocese of Segovia, 1404 – 4 October 1470) was a Spanish churchman, historian and political theorist.

A learned Spanish bishop, after studying law at Salamanca for ten years and there graduating as Doctor, he became secretary to John II of Castile, and Henry IV of Castile. They employed him as envoy on various missions, notably to the Holy See apropos of the Council of Basle, whose conciliarist theories he opposed. While on a mission to the Holy Roman Empire, he was addressed in a letter by Nicholas of Cusa setting forth the latter's theory of explicatio Petri, the unfolding of the Church from Peter.

In 1450 Arévalo gave the annual encomium in honor of St. Thomas Aquinas at the Church of Santa Maria sopra Minerva to the academic community of the College of St. Thomas, the forerunner of the Pontifical University of St. Thomas Aquinas, Angelicum.

After the elevation of Calixtus III, he remained at Rome, became Bishop of Oviedo in Spain, and later commander of the papal fortress, the Castel Sant'Angelo, under Paul II, who transferred him successively to the Spanish sees of Zamora, Calahorra, and Palencia. Rodrigo was the jailer of Julius Pomponius Laetus (Giulio Pomponio Leto), Bartolomeo Platina and other members of the Academia Romana (Roman Academy) suspected of conspiracy by Pope Paul.

== Works ==
His writings, mostly unedited, are in the Vatican and at Padua, and deal with ecclesiastical and political matters. The following have been printed: "Speculum Vitae Humanae" (Rome, 1468), a popular work, frequently reprinted in the next two centuries; it treats of the lights and shadows of the various estates of life; "Historia Hispanica," from the earliest times to 1469 (Rome, 1470), reprinted in the first volume of Andreas Schott's Hispania Illustrata. In addition to his Latin works, Arévalo also penned works in the vernacular. One of these treatises, Suma de la política, demonstrates the influence that Renaissance Humanism was beginning to have on the political and literary works in the kingdom of Castile in the fifteenth century.

In "De Monarchia Orbis et de origine et differentiâ principatus imperialis et regalis" (Rome, 1521), he asserts for the pope the sole right to punish kings. His bold reproofs of certain ecclesiastical dignitaries caused Matthias Flacius to put him down as a forerunner of Martin Luther, but quite unjustly, as Nicolás Antonio has shown in his Bibliotheca Hispanica Vetus (II, 397, 608, 614).

- De arte, disciplina et modo aliendi et erudiendi filios, pueros et juvenes (1453)
- Suma de la política (1454/5), edited by Juan Beneyto Perez (1944), as well as Mario Penna (1959).
- Vergel de príncipes (1456/7)
- Speculum vitae humanae (1468) as Espejo de la vida humana (Zaragoza, 1491)
- Compendiosa historia Hispanica (c. 1470, title page)
