= Masona =

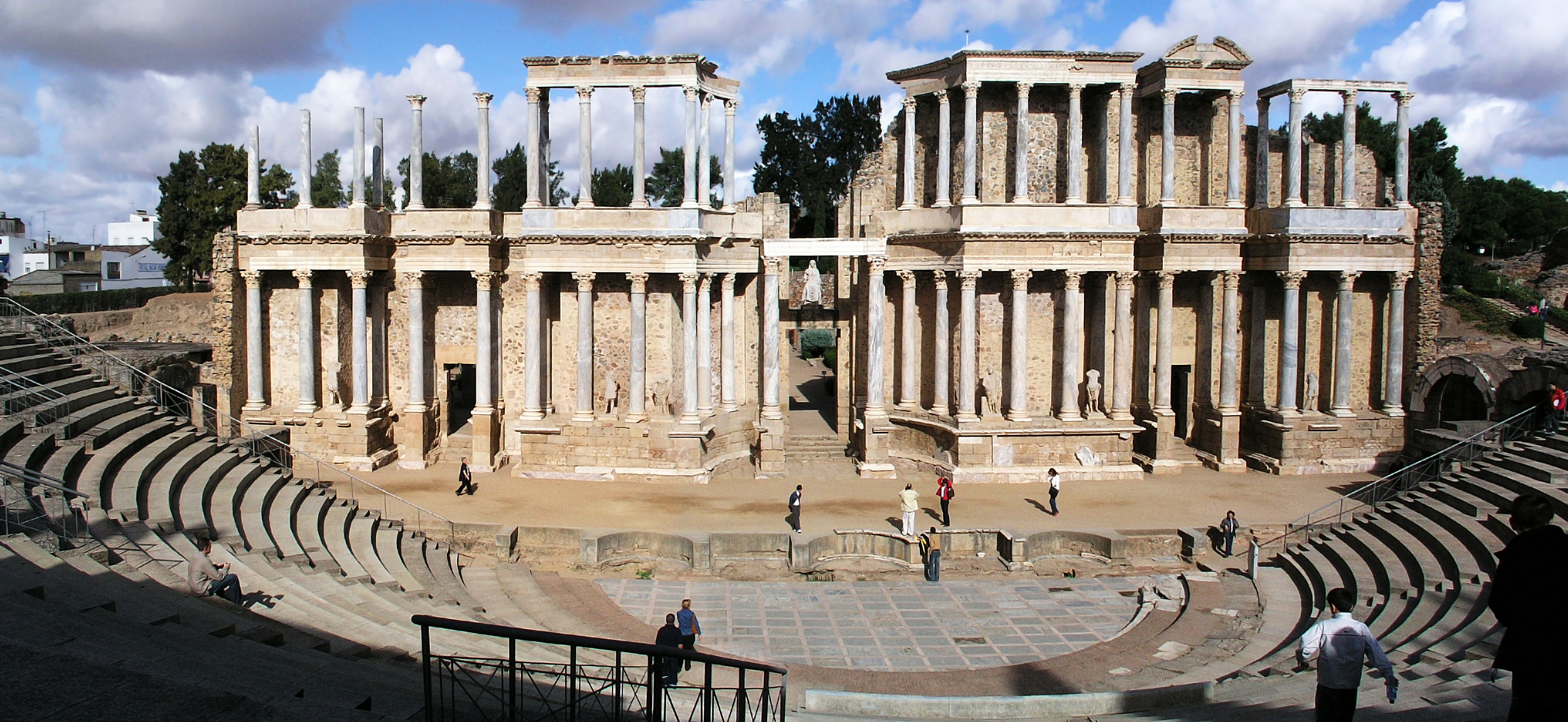
The theatre of Mérida was still usable in Masona's day, when the heavily Romanised city was prospering and in splendid condition.

Masona or Mausona (died c. 600/610) was the Bishop of Mérida and metropolitan of the province of Lusitania from about 570 (certainly by 573) until his death. He is famous for exercising de facto rule of the city of Mérida during his tenure as bishop and for founding the first confirmed hospital in Spain.

He was a Visigoth and originally an Arian, but converted to Roman Catholicism probably in the middle of the 6th century, though some have supposed as late as 579. His biographer says he "was indeed a Goth, but was wholly devoted to God with very ready heart," i.e. Catholic. He entered the church young and served from an early period in the Basilica of Saint Eulalia at Mérida, which had been rebuilt in her honour by Bishop Fidelis around 560. Masona is said to have had such a close relationship with Eulalia that by his prayers, and her intercession, a plague ravishing all Lusitania was lifted. Though no writings of his are known to have survived, Masona was probably educated in a manner similar to men of classical learning, such as the contemporary Leander of Seville, with whom he shared an exile for a time.

== Government and patronage of Mérida ==
Masona built a xenodochium (580), an inn (hostel) for travellers, with a hospital for the sick incorporated. The xenodochium was open to Jews, and Masona is also recorded as showing kindness even to pagans, facts which his biographer clearly thought commendable. He built many churches and monasteries in and around the city, including one dedicated to the Virgin Mary whose foundation stone still survives and fragments, probably from three distinct churches, which survive as components of the current alcazaba. The decor preserved on the fragments is an indicator of the splendour of Masona's building projects.

Besides his xenodochium, Masona instituted a system of public healthcare. Physicians visited each section of the city to find the sick and bring them to the hospital. The main source of travellers to Mérida was in the form of pilgrimages to the shrine of Saint Eulalia, the city's patron saint. The food of the hospital was derived from farms dedicated to the hospital by the bishop. Masona also initiated a programme for the distribution of free wine, corn, oil, and honey for the citizens and rustici (rustics, that is, peasants of the countryside, not the city). Masona established a public credit system by depositing 2,000 solidi with the deacon Redemptus at the basilica for the citizens to take out loans. A system of public bonds was probably a function of the diocese before the episcopate of Masona, however.

== Conflict with Leovigild and the Arians ==
In his early years, Masona was not on poor terms with the Arian king Leovigild. According to his early biographer Paul of Mérida, he even preached a sermon to compare Leovigild to God, the true King, in that both are to be feared: Si regem, ecce regem quem timere oportet; nam non talem qualis tu es. Later Leovigild tried by persuasion and argumentation as well as by threats and bribes to convert Masona back to Arianism, but unsuccessfully. Leovigild ordered a commission to examine the rival claims of Arians and Catholics to the Eulalian basilica, but the majority Arian commission found in favour of the Catholics.

Leovigild then threw his support behind the Arian faction in Mérida. In 582 Leovigild entered Mérida, appointing an Arian bishop, Sunna, following the two years from 580 to 582 when the city's Arian community was possibly suppressed by Hermenegild. Sunna and Masona had co-existed peacefully during the 570s. Leovigild ordered certain basilicas held by the Catholic Church be transferred to Sunna's church and when Masona resisted he was called to Toledo. Leovigild then increased his demands, ordering Masona to hand over the tunic of Eulalia, the most sacred relic of the city, to the Arian faction in Toledo. Masona successfully tricked the king and kept the tunic.

Masona, for noncompliance with the king's last order, was banished. The reason behind Masona's banishment was probably due to his power in the city and his association with the revolt of Hermenegild then being suppressed, rather than any desire for racial apartheid (separateness) which considered Masona, as a Catholic Goth, to be the worst heresy of all. The context of the revolt of Hermenegild was a sudden change in the relations between the Arian and Catholic churches, with each denomination vying for supremacy and political power in the cities. Masona, for instance, had preached a series of anti-Arian sermons on the eve of his city's capture, but this was probably unrelated. While in exile, Masona received 2,000 solidi on which to live from his supporters. During his exile he was replaced by another Catholic, Nepopis. Furthermore, he was not deprived of the right of correspondence. Masona returned to his see by permission of the king, who purportedly had a vision of Saint Eulalia, after three years, in 585. This was the same time at which John of Biclarum, the only other known Catholic Visigoth of the reign of Leovigild, returned from exile.

In 588, following the conversion of the king, Reccared I, Sunna and his accomplices plotted the murder of Masona and the setting up of a rival king in the person of Segga. The plot was betrayed by count Witteric and Sunna undertook a voluntary exile in Mauretania. Since Witteric was later king, it has sometimes been presumed that his rise to power represents an Arian resurgence, but it is more likely that he was a nominally Catholic king who clung to old Arian beliefs and that he redressed the grievances of those who had suffered under Leovigild without reversing any of the religious transformations of Reccared's reign.

== Later years, illness, and death ==
Masona attended the Third Council of Toledo in 589, the first Catholic bishop in order of precedence. At a limited synod in Toledo in 597, Masona was still bishop.

During a serious illness, when he thought he lay dying, Masona manumitted some of his church's slaves and granted them property (exiguas possessiunculas) on which to live without, as the law demanded, compensating his church for their loss of services. The archdeacon Eleutherius, whom Masona had commended the diocese to until a successor was chosen, would probably have negated the bishop's actions by forcibly seizing and destroying the documents of emancipation had not he actually (miraculously) predeceased Masona, who survived the illness. The grants of small estates to the slaves was meant to confirm their new liberty.

A letter supposedly from Isidore of Seville to Masona, and dated to 606, would place the latter's death sometime after that date, but the authenticity of the letter is debatable. The chief source for Masona is the Vitas sanctorum patrum Emeritensium, roughly modelled on the Dialogues of Gregory the Great, which devotes more space to Masona than to either of the other "holy fathers of Mérida", Paul and Fidelis. The portion of the work covering Masona alone is sometimes referred to as the Vita Masonae or Life of Masona. Fidelis was Masona's predecessor; he was succeeded by one Renovatus.
