= Francesco Monterisi =

Italian cardinal of the Catholic Church (born 1934)

His Eminence Francesco Monterisi
- Archpriest Emeritus of the Basilica of Saint Paul Outside-the-Walls
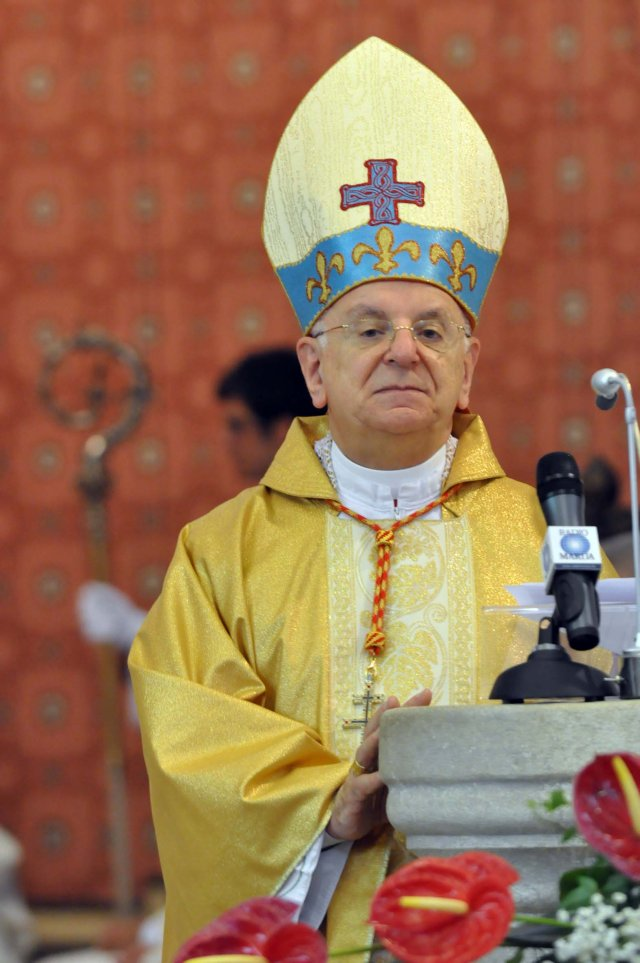
- Monterisi in Sarajevo in 2012
- Church: Catholic Church
- Appointed: 3 July 2009
- Term ended: 23 November 2012
- Predecessor: Andrea Cordero Lanza di Montezemolo
- Successor: James Michael Harvey
- Other post: Cardinal-Priest 'pro hac vice' of San Paolo alla Regola (2021-)
- Previous posts: Titular Archbishop of Alba Maritima (1983–2010); Apostolic Pro-Nuncio to Korea (1981–86); Apostolic Nuncio to Bosnia-Herzegovina (1993–98); Secretary of the Congregation for Bishops (1998–2009); Secretary of the College of Cardinals (1998–2009); Cardinal-Deacon of San Paolo alla Regola (2010-21)

Orders
- Ordination: 16 March 1957 by Reginaldo Giuseppe Maria Addazi
- Consecration: 6 January 1983 by Pope John Paul II
- Created cardinal: 20 November 2010 by Pope Benedict XVI
- Rank: Cardinal-Deacon (2010-21); Cardinal-Priest (2021-)

Personal details
- Born: Francesco Marco Nicola Monterisi; 28 May 1934 (age 92) Barletta, Kingdom of Italy
- Denomination: Catholic (Roman Rite)
- Education: Pontifical Lateran University; Pontifical Ecclesiastical Academy
- Motto: Fortitudo mea Dominus
- Coat of arms

Francesco Marco Nicola Monterisi (born 28 May 1934) is an Italian cardinal of the Catholic Church, who worked in the diplomatic service of the Holy See from 1964 to 1998 and then held senior positions in the Roman Curia until he retired in 2014.

== Early life and ordination ==
After his elementary and secondary studies in Barletta, he entered the Pontifical Minor Seminary and then the Pontifical Major Seminary. From 1951 to 1958, he studied at the Pontifical Lateran University, where he obtained a doctorate in theology.

Monterisi was ordained to the priesthood on 16 March 1957 and returned to Apulia for several years. Beginning in 1961 he prepared for a diplomat's career at the Pontifical Ecclesiastical Academy while also earning a doctorate in canon law at the Pontifical Lateran University in 1964, the year he joined the diplomatic service of the Holy See.

== Nuncio ==
On 24 December 1982, he was appointed Pro-Nuncio to Korea and Titular Archbishop of Alba Maritima. Monterisi received his episcopal consecration on 6 January 1983 from Pope John Paul II, with Archbishops Eduardo Martínez Somalo and Duraisamy Simon Lourdusamy serving as co-consecrators.

In 1990 Monterisi was appointed delegate for Pontifical Representations, the personnel chief not only for Vatican diplomats but for the whole Roman curia.

Pope John Paul named him the first Apostolic Nuncio to Bosnia and Herzegovina on 11 June 1993.

== Roman Curia ==
Styles of Francesco Monterisi
- Reference style: His Eminence
- Spoken style: Your Eminence
- Religious style: Cardinal
- Informal style: Cardinal

Pope John Paul named him Secretary of the Congregation for Bishops on 7 March 1998. While serving at the Congregation for Bishops he was also secretary of the College of Cardinals. He was secretary of the 2005 papal conclave, which elected Pope Benedict XVI.

On 21 December 2002, he was made a member of the Pontifical Council for the Pastoral Care of Migrants and Itinerant People.

On 3 July 2009, Pope Benedict appointed Archbishop Monterisi to the post of Archpriest of the Basilica of Saint Paul Outside-the-Walls.

On 20 November 2010, he was created Cardinal-Deacon of San Paolo alla Regola. On 29 December 2010, he was appointed a member of the Congregation for the Oriental Churches and the Congregation for the Causes of Saints. On 24 October 2012, Monterisi was appointed a member of the Congregation for Bishops. (Note: Pope Francis confirmed his memberships in the Congregation for Bishops on 16 December 2013, the Congregation for the Causes of Saints on 19 December 2013, and the Congregation for Oriental Churches on 19 February 2014, and as councilor to the Pontifical Commission for Latin America on 15 January 2014.)

He was one of the cardinal electors who participated in the 2013 papal conclave that elected Pope Francis.

After ten years at the rank of cardinal deacon, he exercised his option to assume the rank of cardinal priest, which Pope Francis confirmed on 3 May 2021.

== Notes ==
Political offices
Position established	Delegate for Pontifical Representations; 28 August 1990 – 7 March 1998	Succeeded by Carlo Maria Viganò
Catholic Church titles
Preceded by Ignacy Ludwik Jeż	— TITULAR — Titular Archbishop of Alba marittima 24 December 1982 – 20 November 2010	Succeeded by Celso Morga Iruzubieta
Preceded by Jorge María Mejía	Secretary of the Congregation for Bishops; 7 March 1998 – 3 July 2009	Succeeded by Manuel Monteiro de Castro
Preceded by Jorge María Mejía	Secretary of the College of Cardinals; 7 March 1998 – 21 October 2009	Succeeded by Manuel Monteiro de Castro
Preceded by Andrea Cordero Lanza di Montezemolo	Archpriest of the Basilica of Saint Paul Outside the Walls; 3 July 2009 – 23 November 2012	Succeeded by James Michael Harvey
Preceded by Michael Browne	Cardinal-Deacon of San Paolo alla Regola; 20 November 2010 –	Incumbent
Diplomatic posts
Preceded by Luciano Angeloni	Apostolic Pro-Nuncio to Korea; 24 December 1981 – 19 June 1986	Succeeded by John Bulaitis
Nunciature established	Apostolic Nuncio to Bosnia and Herzegovina; 11 June 1993 – 7 March 1998	Succeeded by Giuseppe Leanza
