= Diocese of Alba Maritima =

Coordinates: 43.9380°N 15.4410°E

Alba Maritima (Italian: Alba Marittima, lit. 'White city by the sea') is a Catholic titular see. It corresponds to current Biograd na Moru in Croatia. Its last titular was archbishop Celso Morga Iruzubieta, until he was appointed as coadjutor archbishop of Mérida-Badajoz.

== History ==
The titular see refers to the diocese of Zaravecchia (Biograd), and it is also known with the name of Alba Marittima, in Dalmatia, built in the 11th century; when the city was destroyed bishops moved their titular see to Scardona.

From the 20th century Alba Marittima has been restored as a full Titular see.

== Titular bishops and archbishops ==
- Matthaeus Berniacovich, O.F.M. (20 December 1675 – 10 January 1707 )
- Lucas Natale (24 January 1709 Appointed – 19 January 1720 died)
- Anton von Thurn und Valsassina † (23 December 1729 – 2 March 1733)
- Sandor Bodonyi (17 November 1806 – 1812 died)
- Michael Johann Wagner (27 April 1833 – 1 February 1836 )
- Giovanni Battista Krapàc (20 January 1904 – 24 May 1910 )
- Dominik Premus (26 February 1915 – 27 March 1934 died)
- Frederick Hall, M.H.M. (9 April 1948 – 25 March 1953 nominated archbishop of Kisumu)
- François-Marie Picaud (5 August 1954 – 29 March 1960 Died)
- Ignacy Ludwik Jeż (20 April 1960 – 28 June 1972 nominated bishop of Koszalin-Kołobrzeg)
- Francesco Monterisi (24 December 1982 – 20 November 2010 nominated cardinal deacon of San Paolo alla Regola)
- Celso Morga Iruzubieta (29 December 2010 – 8 October 2014 nominated archbishop coadjutor of Mérida-Badajoz)
- Augusto Paolo Lojudice, from 6 March 2015
- Giovanni Gaspari (21 September 2020 – present)

== Sources ==
- "diocese/d2a68". Catholic-Hierarchy.org. David M. Cheney.
- Diocese at www.gcatholic.org
