= Badajoz Cathedral =

Catholic cathedral in Badajoz, Spain

- Metropolitan Cathedral of Saint John the Baptist
- Catedral Metropolitana de San Juan Bautista
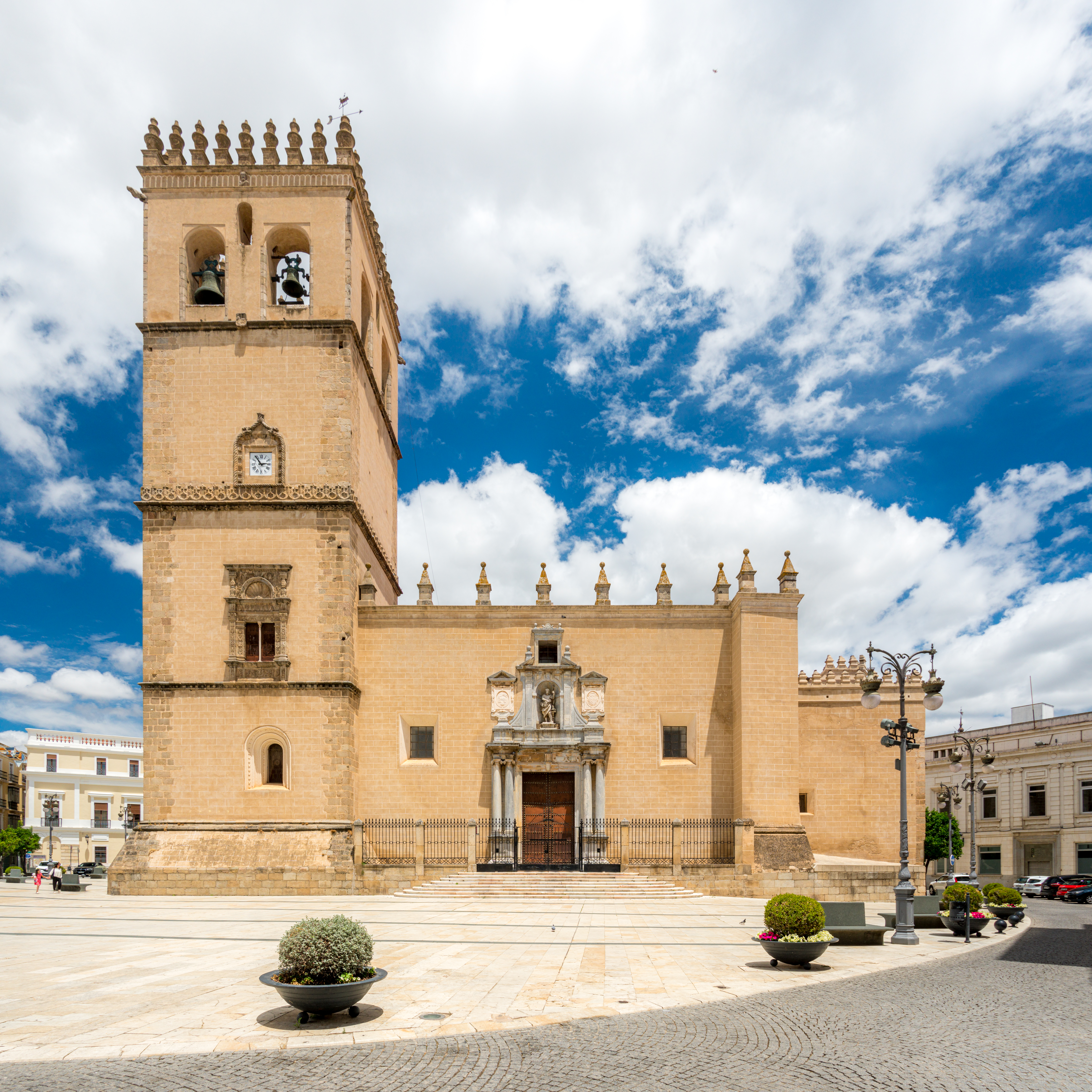
- West façade in 2024.
- Badajoz Cathedral
- 38°52′42.40″N 6°58′9.89″W
- Location: Badajoz
- Address: 1, Plaza España
- Country: Spain
- Denomination: Catholic
- Website: catedraldebadajoz.es

History
- Status: Metropolitan Cathedral
- Dedication: John the Baptist

Architecture
- Style: Gothic
- Groundbreaking: 15th Century

Specifications
- Length: 70 m (229 ft 8 in)
- Width: 40 m (131 ft 3 in)

Administration
- Archdiocese: Mérida–Badajoz

Clergy
- Archbishop: Celso Morga Iruzubieta

Spanish Cultural Heritage
- Type: Non-movable
- Criteria: Monument
- Designated: 3 June 1931
- Reference no.: RI-51-0000394

The Metropolitan Cathedral of Saint John the Baptist (Spanish: Catedral Metropolitana de San Juan Bautista) is a Catholic cathedral in Badajoz, Extremadura, western Spain. Since 1994, together with the Co-cathedral of Saint Mary Major of Mérida, it is the seat of the Archdiocese of Mérida-Badajoz.

== History ==
After the reconquest of Badajoz in 1230 by King Alfonso IX of León, the new bishop Pedro Pérez initially adapted the former mosque in the Badajoz Alcazaba (citadel) as a cathedral. A new cathedral was not begun until the mid-13th century. The site chosen was that of a pre-existing Visigothic and Mozarabic church in the Campo de San Juan, situated outside the citadel.

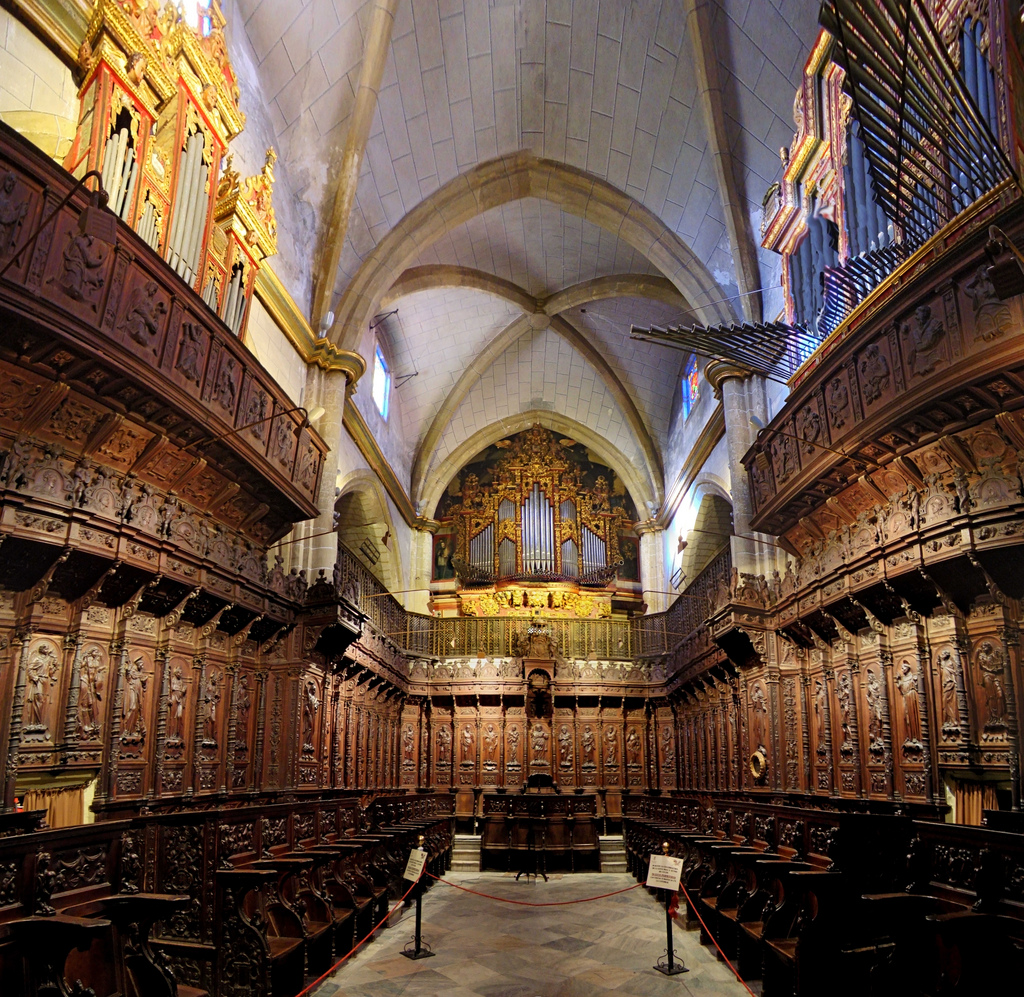
View of the choir.

In 1270, though the construction was not finished, the new cathedral was consecrated and dedicated to St. John the Baptist. The various works on the building lasted until the 15th century, and were followed by some modifications and renovations in the 16th-17th centuries.

The church was declared a national historical monument in 1931. On July 28, 1994, Pope John Paul II established the Archdiocese of Mérida-Badajoz, making the Church of Saint John the Baptist its metropolitan cathedral.

From 1587 to 1596, Cristóbal de Medrano became the Maestro de capillo at the Cathedral of Badajoz.

== Description ==
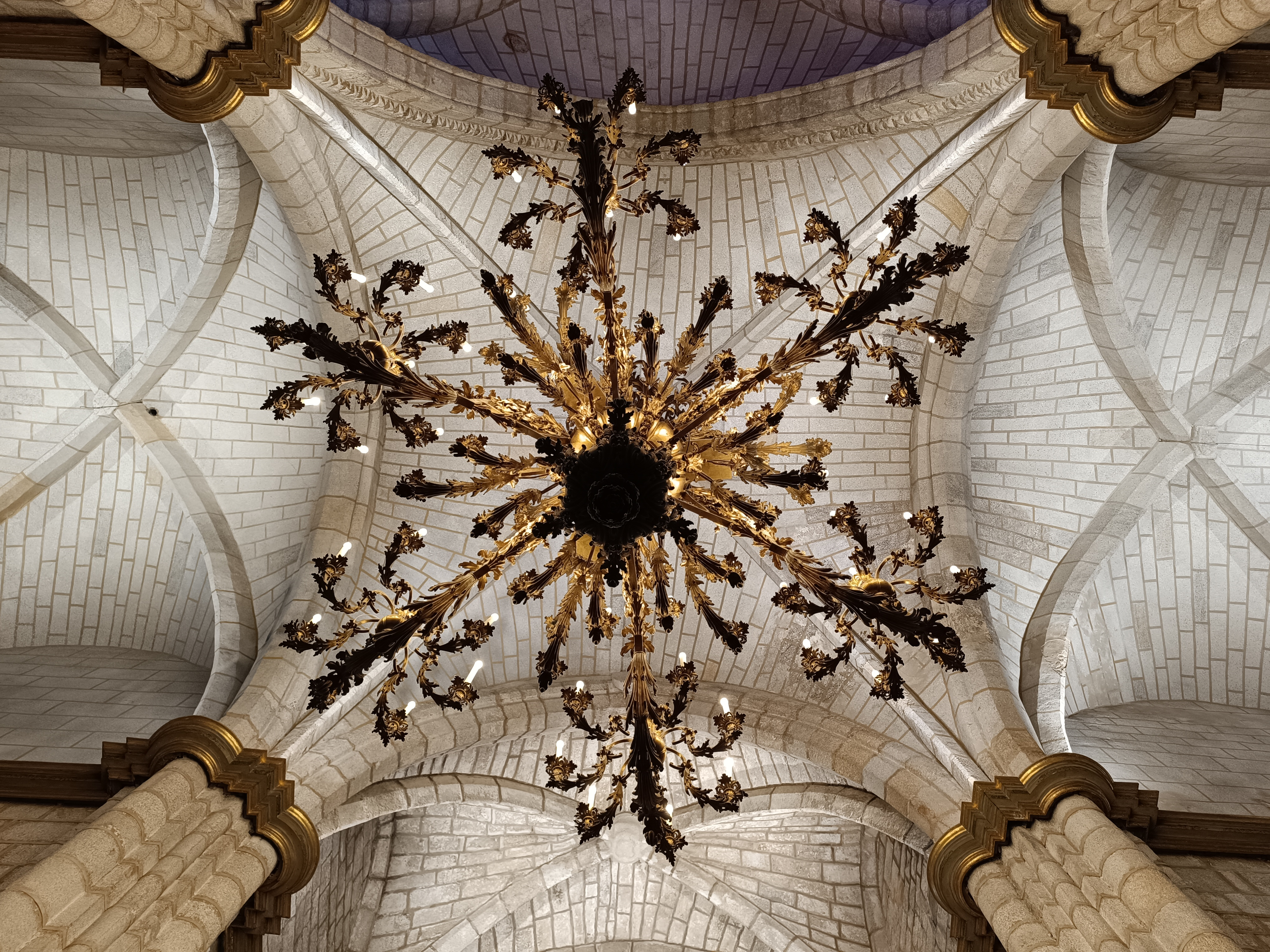
Chandelier in the transept

Due to its position outside the citadel, the church has a fortress-like appearance, with strong walls and bastions, and a sturdy square tower. The tower measures 11 meters on each side and 14 meters in height, and consists in four sections, the top one housing the bells. The original design included two of such towers.

The church itself has a simple rectangular main façade with one marble portal, built in 1619. The portalis flanked by two Ionic columns and is surmounted by a niche with a statue of St. John the Baptist. The portal of St. Blaise, on the southern side, is most likely the oldest one: it is flanked by two pilasters and features a small image of the saint to which it is entitled. All the walls, and the tower as well, feature Gothic merlons. The cathedral's interior is in the late Gothic architectural style, and has a nave and two aisles, side chapels, a high altar (with a highly decorated Baroque retablo) and a choir with Plateresque stalls and a Baroque organ.

The cloister is in Manueline Portuguese style.
