= Joël Mercier =

The Most Reverend Joël Mercier
- Secretary of the Congregation for the Clergy
- Church: Roman Catholic Church
- Appointed: 8 January 2015
- Predecessor: Celso Morga Iruzubieta
- Successor: Andrés Gabriel Ferrada Moreira
- Other post: Titular Archbishop of Rota (2015–)

Orders
- Ordination: 27 June 1970 by Louis Marie Henri Mazerat
- Consecration: 19 March 2015 by Pietro Parolin

Personal details
- Born: Joël Michel Marie Luc Mercier; 5 January 1945 (age 81) Chaudefonds-sur-Layon, France
- Education: Catholic University of the West; Paris-Sorbonne University; Pontifical Gregorian University
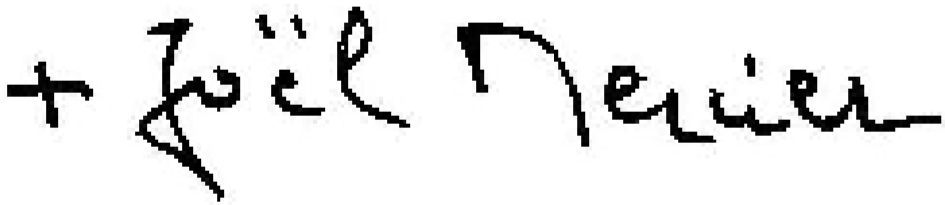
- Signature

- Coat of arms

Joël Mercier (born 5 January 1945) is a French prelate of the Roman Catholic Church who serves in the Roman Curia as the Secretary of the Congregation for the Clergy.

== Biography ==
Mercier was born in Chaudefonds-sur-Layon, France, and ordained a priest of the Diocese of Angers on 27 June 1970.

He did his graduate studies in classics at the Sorbonne and in 1964 entered the seminary in his Angers, where he earned a B.A. in philosophy and a licentiate in theology at the Catholic University of the West. On 27 June 1970 he was ordained a priest for the Diocese of Angers.

From 1971 to 1974 he completed his training at the Pontifical Gregorian University in Rome where he obtained a license and then a doctorate in canon law.

He then served as vicar at St. Joseph Parish in Angers until 1979. He was chaplain of the College and Catholic High School in Angers from 1979 to 1987, when Bishop Jean Orchampt made him his private secretary. He held that post until 2001. While in that position, he served as a member of the ecclesiastical court "Pays de Loire" beginning in 1975 and as a member of the Theological Faculty of Angers beginning in 1980.

In January 2002 he entered the service of the Roman Curia as official of the Congregation for Bishops. He was appointed chaplain of His Holiness on 31 October 2005. In 2007 he was named spiritual director of the French Seminary in Rome.

On 8 January 2015, Pope Francis appointed him Secretary of the Congregation for the Clergy and named him titular Archbishop of Rota in Spain. He succeeds Archbishop Celso Morga Iruzubieta who was appointed Coadjutor Archbishop of Mérida–Badajoz in October 2014.
