= Vitas Patrum Emeritensium =

The Vitas Patrum Emeritensium is an early medieval Latin hagiographical work written by an otherwise unknown Paul, a deacon of Mérida. The work narrates the lives of the five bishops who held the see of Mérida in the second half of the 6th-century and the first half of the 7th-century: Paul, Fidelis, Masona, Innocentius and Renovatius, with particular space being given to the life of Masona.

== Date of composition ==
The date of composition is debated, but is generally thought to have been made in the 7th-century, with the preface and the first three chapters added on in later centuries. However, some scholars argue that the work could have been written as late as the 9th-century. First printed in 1633 in Madrid, only half a dozen manuscripts plus some fragments survive.
Javier Arce states that it was written during the episcopate of Stephen (633-638) and finally compiled and corrected during the episcopate of Festus (672-680). In his opinion, the work was written by an anonymous deacon of Merida, while deacon Paulus was responsible for the final compilation.

== Historical significance ==
The Vitas Patrum Emeritensium is a major source for the study of the Visigothic Kingdom of Toledo. It contains many indications about common life in Hispania in the VI and VII centuries such as nourishment, education, and clothing. It is also important for our knowledge about the organisation of Catholic and Arian Churches and the path that led to the conversion of the Visigothic people to Catholicism.
