= Co-Cathedral of Mérida, Spain =

Roman Catholic church in Mérida, Spain

Metropolitan co-cathedral of Saint Mary Major Concatedral metropolitana de San Maria la Mayor
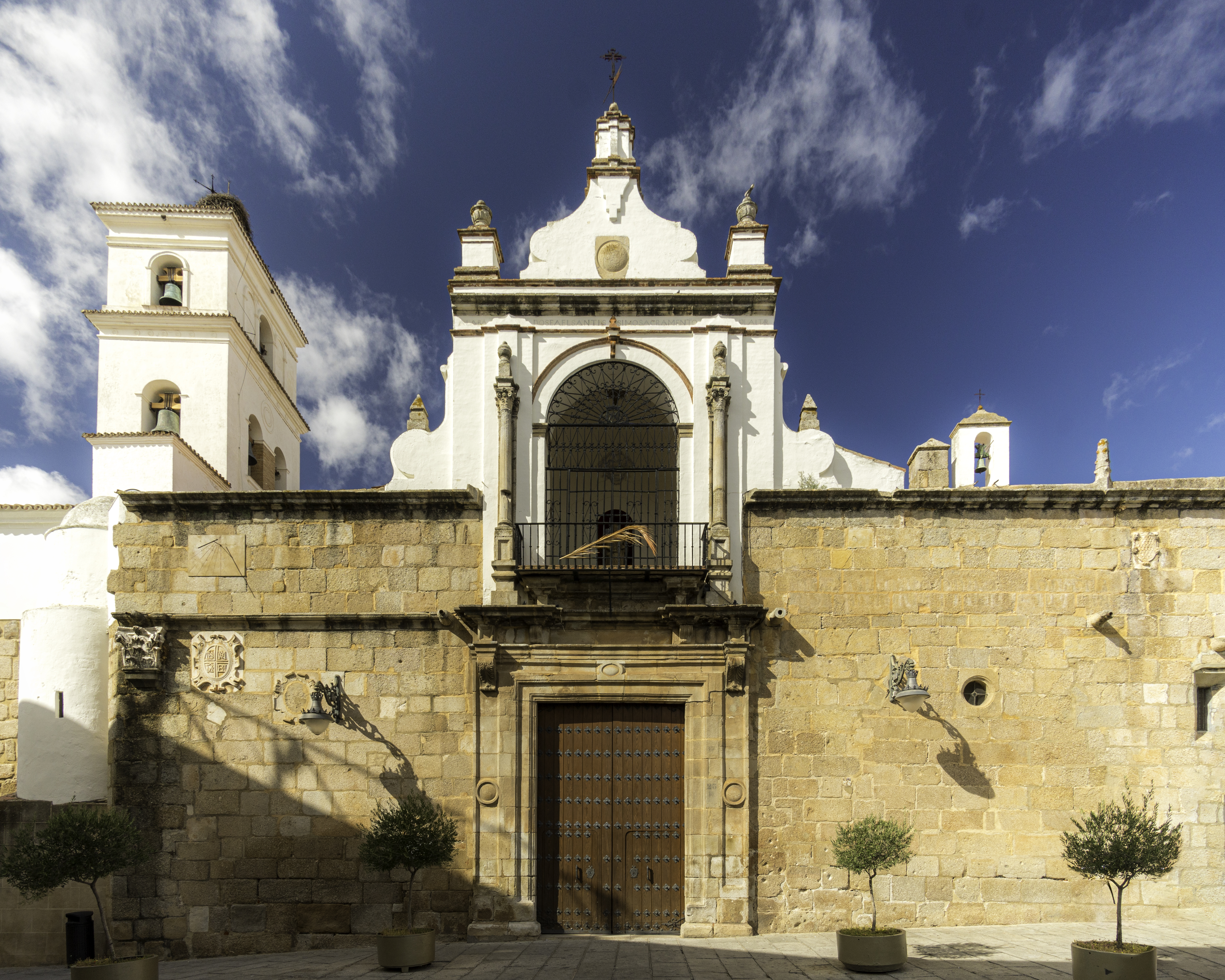
- South portico.

Religion
- Affiliation: Roman Catholic
- Ecclesiastical or organisational status: Metropolitan co-cathedral
- Leadership: Archbishop Santiago García

Location
- Location: Mérida, Spain
- Interactive map of Metropolitan co-cathedral of Saint Mary Major; Concatedral metropolitana de San Maria la Mayor
- Coordinates: 38°54′58.8″N 6°20′49.7″W

Architecture
- Type: Church
- Style: Gothic, Romanesque
- Groundbreaking: 1239
- Completed: 1579

Specifications
- Length: 45 metres (148 ft)
- Width: 30 metres (98 ft)

The Metropolitan co-cathedral of Saint Mary Major of Mérida (Spanish: Concatedral metropolitana de San Maria la Mayor) is a Roman Catholic cathedral church in Mérida, Extremadura, western Spain. Since 1994, together with the Metropolitan Cathedral of Saint John the Baptist of Badajoz, it is the seat of the Archdiocese of Mérida-Badajoz.

== History ==
Mérida was founded in the 25 BC, with the name of Emerita Augusta, by order of Emperor Augustus, to protect a pass and a bridge over the Guadiana river. The city became one of the most important cities in the Roman Empire. After the fall of the Western Roman Empire, during the Visigothic period, the city maintained much of its splendor, especially under the 6th century domination of the bishops of Emerita, when it was the capital of Hispania. The see of the bishopric of Emerita was "Church of Saint Mary of Jerusalem" (Spanish: Santa María de Ierusalem).

In 713 Mérida was conquered by the Muslim army under Musa bin Nusair but it is not until 28 February 1119 that the metropolitan see of the Bishops of Emerita was transferred to Santiago de Compostela by the bull of Pope Calixtus II.

The city returned under Christians hands in 1230, when it was conquered by Alfonso IX of León. The city was attached to the Archdiocese of Santiago de Compostela. The construction began on a chapel dedicated to Virgin Mary on the ruins of the Visigothic cathedral.

In 1479, Don Alonso de Cárdenas, Master of the Order of Santiago, ordered the extension of the chapel with the intention to make it the main church of the city. In 1620, a bull of Pope Paul V creates the title of titular bishop of Mérida. The bishop was chosen among the priests of the Order of Santiago, that chose the church of Santa María as see of their bishopric.

On 28 July 1994 Pope John Paul II established the Archdiocese of Mérida-Badajoz, making the Church of Saint John Baptist his metropolitan cathedral and co-cathedral the church of Saint Mary Major of Mérida.

== Description ==
=== Exterior ===
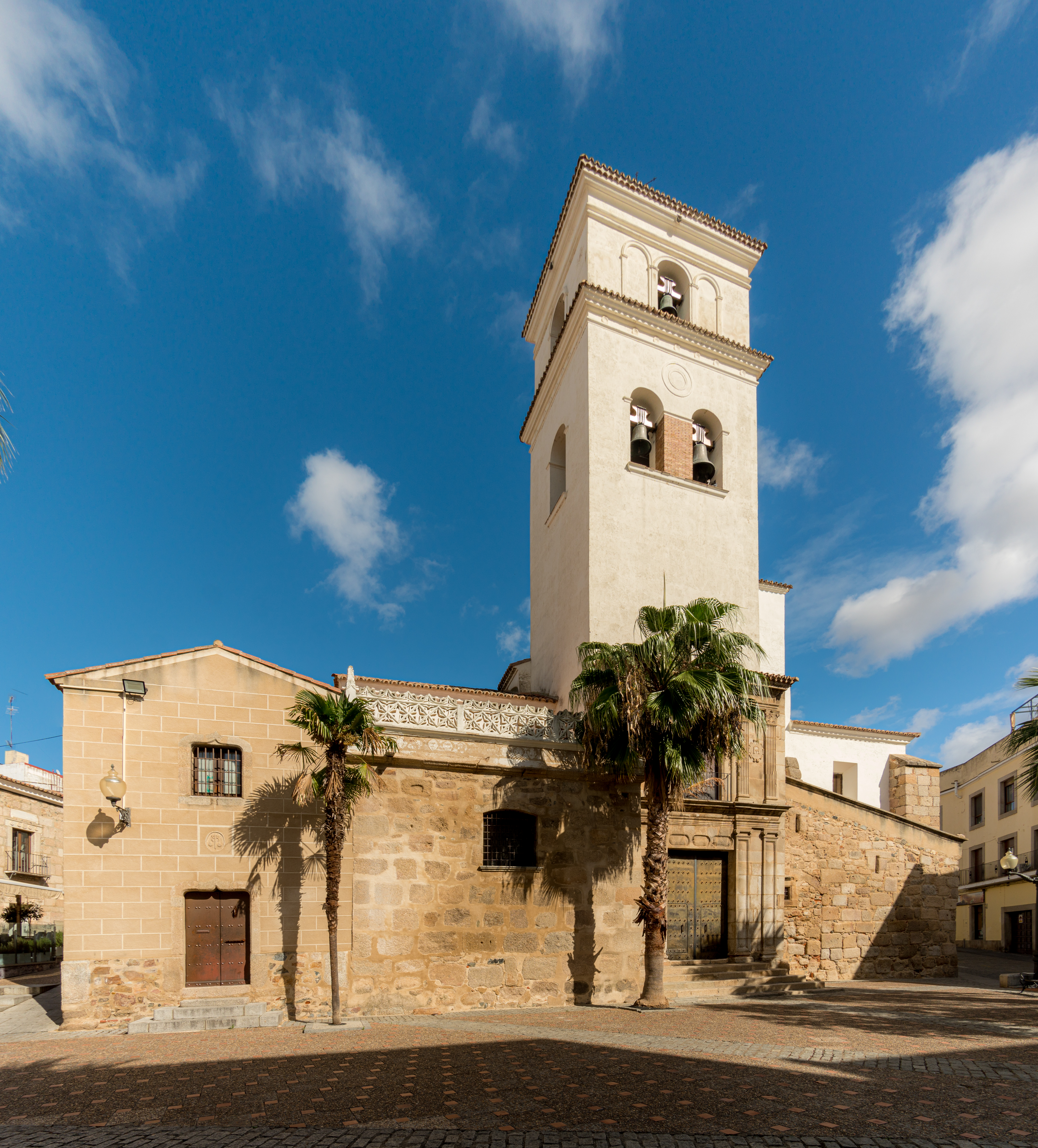
Tower and Puerta del Perdón.

The cathedral includes three decorated doors. La Portada de Santa Maria, which opens to the Plaza de España, consists of a lintelled body on which stands a vaulted shrine, framed by two columns with Corinthian capitals, which house a statue of Nuestra Señora de la Guía. The current shrine was erected in 1766 on a preexisting 16th century one, commanded to be erected by Francisco Moreno de Almaraz, Peruvian conqueror. The Puerta del Perdón, on the eastern side of the church, faces the Plaza de Santa Maria. It is an 18th-century neoclassical façade, the work of Mateo Sánchez Villaviciosa. It consists of two parts: the bottom, contains double pillars hewn in the Ionic style and the top has corinthian fluted pillars framing the shields of Mérida and the Order of Santiago. Above it rises the bell tower, with a square base and in which there is a 16th-century music box with 10 bells and a clock of incalculable historic and artistic value, comparable only in Spain to the Cathedral of Santo Domingo de la Calzada. The Puerta del Norte was recently reinforced after restoration work done on the cathedral.

=== Interior ===
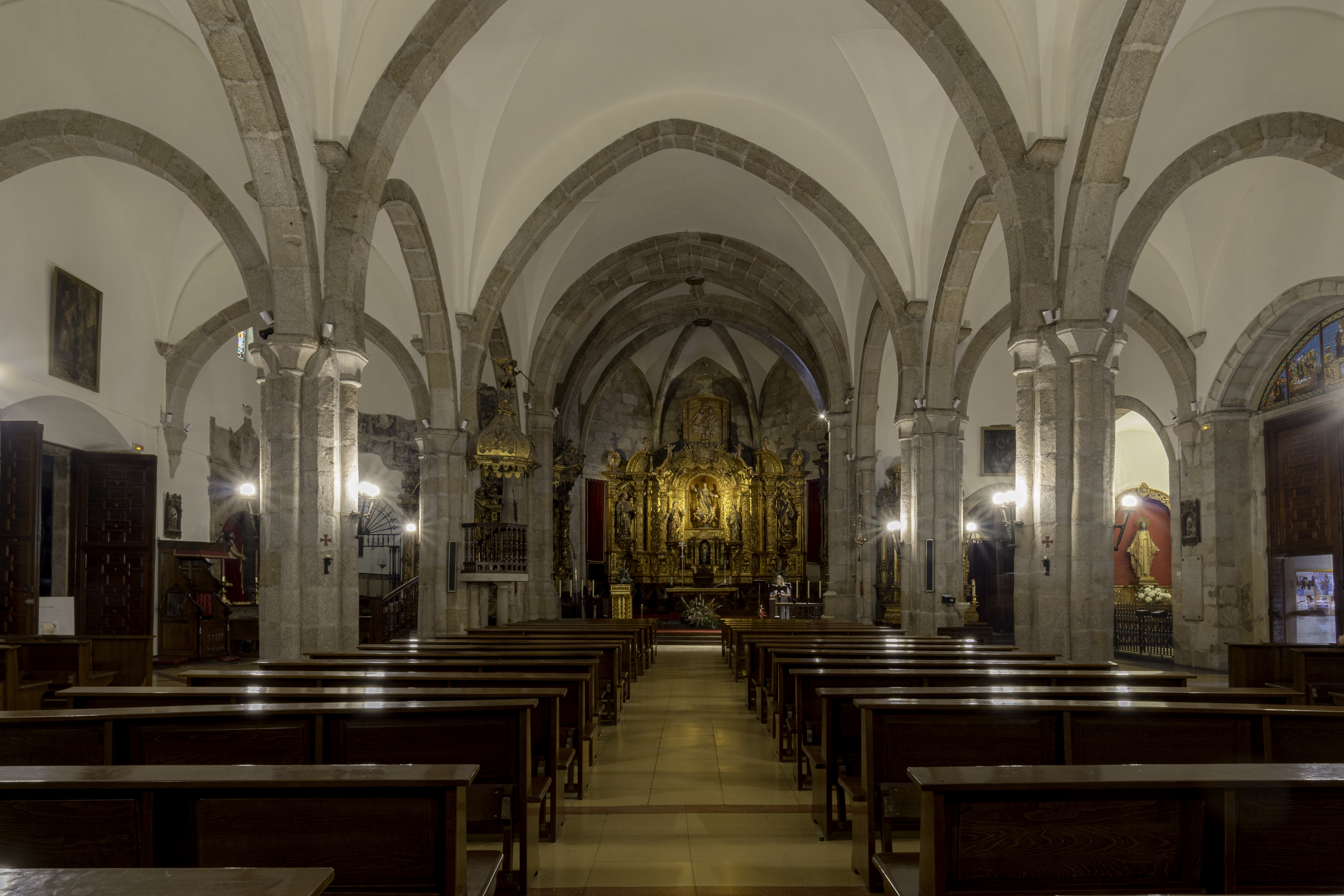
Interior.

The cathedral is rectangular in shape and consists of three naves (the central one is two times wider than the lateral ones), separated by square pillars, with a detached column on each face upon which pointed arches are alighted. The roof of the auditoriums was originally of a Mudejar style ceiling but is now vault shaped.

The high altar consists of two sections. Covered with a vault of tierceron, the first is on a rectangular base and the second on a spectrum, with keys decorated with a rosette plant and the Mystic Lamb. On both sides of the presbytery, under arcosolia, the tombs in alabaster of Don Diego de Vera Mendoza, of the Order of Santiago and his wife Doña Marina Gomez de Figueroa can be admired. The central apse is decorated with a large altarpiece from 1762, which two bodies surround a 13th-century window.

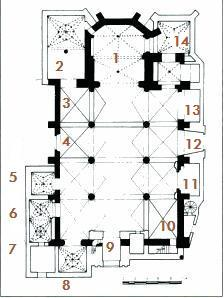
Floor plan of the cathedral:1. High altar; 2. The Blessed Sacrament Chapel; 3. Altar of the Santísimo Cristo de las Injurias; 5. Chapel of Our Lord Jesus Christ or of the Mendoza; 6. Old Sacristy; 7. House of Sexton; 8. Bautisto chapel or the Baptistery; 10. Altar of Our Father Jesus of Medina; 11. Chapel of Our Lady of the Forsaken or of the Vera; 12. Chapel and Dressing room of Nuestra Señora de la Guia; 13. Chapel of San Antonio; 14. Chapel of the Conde de la Roca - Chapter Hall.

The central vaulted niche of the second body, which rests on a pedestal base, is occupied by an image of the Virgin Mary, accompanied by the apostles Peter and Paul and the local saints Eulalia and Julia.

Among the apsidal chapels, the Chapel of the Epistola, of the Earls of la Roca, is the most notable. It is divided into two sections and both covered with ribbed vaults, decorated with their shield.

=== Works of art ===
The church's interior cathedral contains works of art of great value, including the following:

- Sculpture of Cristo de la O. (mid-16th century)
- Sculpture of the Santísimo Cristo de las Injurias.
- Sculpture of the Immaculate Conception
- Altar supporter from the Visigothic period.

== Liturgical feasts in Merida Cathedral ==
- Holy week. During the Passion Week, Mérida Cathedral is the scene of a multitude of liturgical and religious rites.
- Corpus Christi.
- Sacred Heart of Jesus.
- Dedication of the Cathedral.
- Assumption of Mary.
- Guardian Angels.
- Immaculate Conception of Mary. On the morning of December 8, the act of the Renewal of the Vow of the Immaculate Conception of Mary by the city council takes place.
- Saint Eulalia main patroness of the city. On the eve of the feast of the Martyr, Saint Eulalia, the sculpture of the patron saint of Mérida goes on procession from the basilica to the cathedral where it stays overnight. After the Eucharistic celebration on 10 December, the image of the saint returns in solemn procession headed by the archbishop of the city to the basilica where the wreath offering and the Solemn Pontifical Eucharist take place.
