= Augusto Paolo Lojudice =

Italian prelate of the Catholic Church (born 1964)

His Eminence Augusto Paolo Lojudice
- Cardinal, Archbishop of Siena-Colle di Val d'Elsa-Montalcino
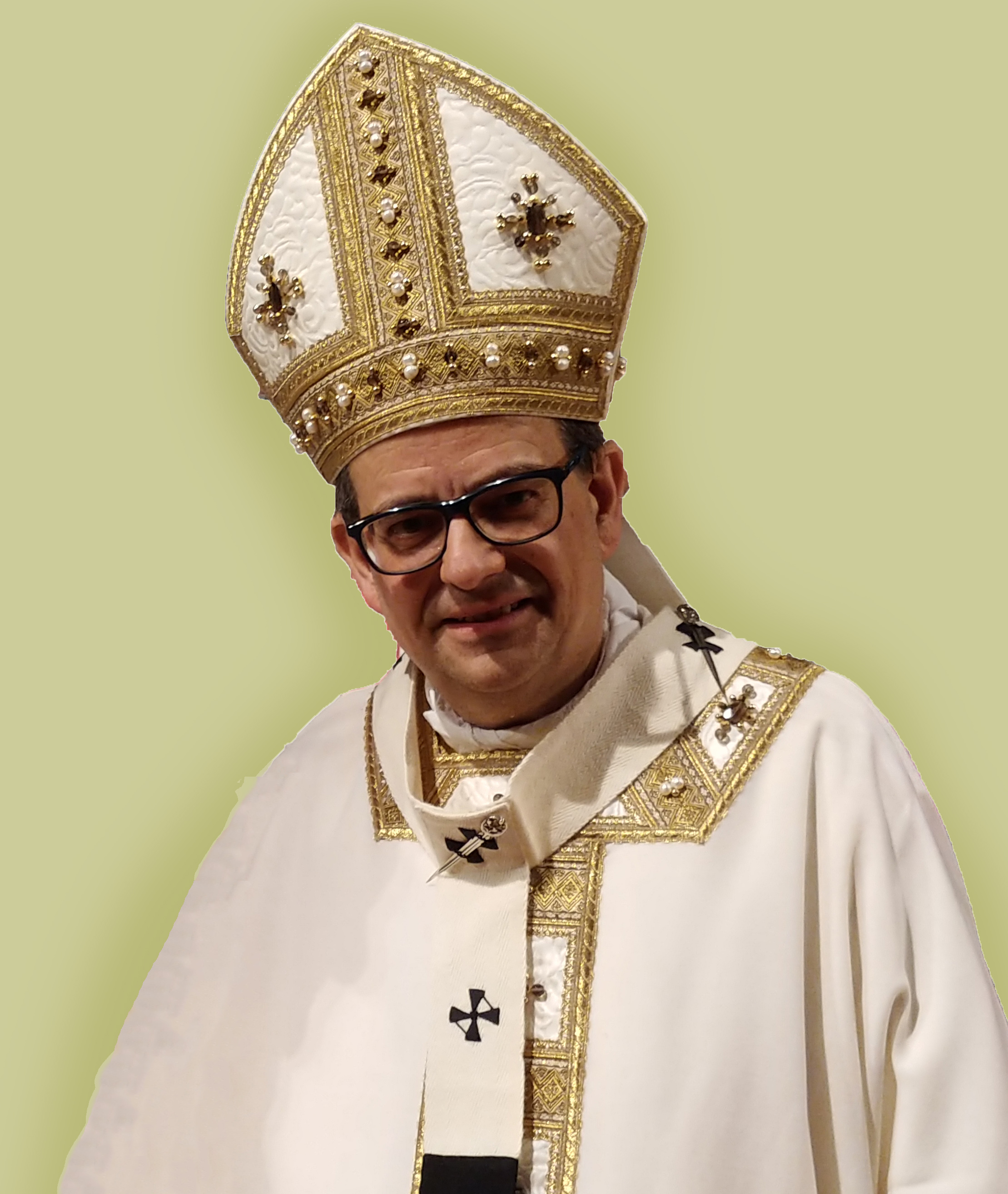
- Church: Catholic Church
- Archdiocese: Siena-Colle di Val d'Elsa-Montalcino
- See: Siena-Colle di Val d'Elsa Montalcino
- Appointed: 6 May 2019
- Installed: 16 June 2019
- Predecessor: Antonio Buoncristiani
- Other post: Cardinal-Priest of Santa Maria del Buon Consiglio (2020-)
- Previous posts: Auxiliary Bishop of Rome (2015-19); Titular Bishop of Alba marittima (2015-19)

Orders
- Ordination: 6 May 1989 by Ugo Poletti
- Consecration: 23 May 2015 by Agostino Vallini
- Created cardinal: 28 November 2020 by Pope Francis
- Rank: Cardinal-Priest

Personal details
- Born: Augusto Paolo Lojudice; 1 July 1964 (age 62) Rome, Italy
- Motto: Latin: Mihi Fecistis
- Coat of arms: Augusto Paolo Lojudice's coat of arms

Augusto Paolo Lojudice (born 1 July 1964) is an Italian prelate of the Catholic Church who has been Archbishop of Siena-Colle di Val d'Elsa-Montalcino since 2019. He was named Bishop of Montepulciano-Chiusi-Pienza in July 2022.

Pope Francis raised him to the rank of cardinal on 28 November 2020.

== Early life and education ==
Augusto Paolo Lojudice was born in Rome on 1 July 1964. He studied philosophy and theology at Pontificio Seminario Maggiore from 1983 to 1988, earning a licentiate in theology. He earned his high school diploma in 1983 at the Liceo San Benedetto da Norcia. He prepared for the priesthood at the Pontifical Roman Major Seminary and studied theology and philosophy at the Pontifical Gregorian University from 1983 to 1988 and earned a licentiate in theology.

== Priest ==
He was ordained a priest on 6 May 1989 by Cardinal Ugo Poletti, Cardinal Vicar of Rome. His pastoral assignments were in the rougher neighborhoods, neglected by municipal services, with poorer populations and higher crime rates. He was parish vicar (assistant pastor) at the parish of Santa Maria del Buon Consiglio for three years, and at San Vigilio (Rome) from 1992 to 1997. He was the pastor of the parish of Santa Maria Madre del Redentore from 2005 to 2013. He was also the spiritual advisor at the Major Roman Pontifical Seminary from 2005 to 2014. He was led the parish of San Luca al Prenestino from 2014 to 2015. As he developed his own experience with migrant living conditions beginning in 2006, he brought seminarians to their camps, which were managed by the city government. He then led investigations that revealed the misappropriation of funds meant to improve living conditions in the camps. He later rejected the label "street priest": "It's about being a priest and that's enough. Labels are a waste of time. It's not like there are options to choose. The Gospel is the only option. Then each of us has his own character and sensibility. But it all belongs to the Gospel."

== Bishop and cardinal ==
On 6 March 2015, Pope Francis appointed Lojudice auxiliary bishop of the Diocese of Rome and titular bishop of the Alba Maritima. He received his episcopal ordination in the Archbasilica of St. John Lateran, the cathedral of Rome, on 23 May 2015 from Cardinal Agostino Vallini, Cardinal Vicar of Rome. He was responsible for the southern part of the city and its periphery as well as Ostia on the coast.

On 6 May 2019 he was appointed Archbishop of Siena-Colle di Val d'Elsa-Montalcino. He was installed there on 16 June.

Within the Italian Episcopal Conference he is secretary of the Commission on Migration. He has decried the anti-immigrant sentiment promoted by "certain mobsters" and asserted that "most Romans have a fundamentally charitable attitude and are not easily influenced".

On 25 October 2020, Pope Francis announced he would raise him to the rank of cardinal at a consistory scheduled for 28 November 2020. No archbishop of Siena has been made a cardinal since 1801. At that consistory, Pope Francis made him Cardinal-Priest of Santa Maria del Buon Consiglio. On 16 December he was named a member of the Congregation for Bishops. On 21 July 2022, Pope Francis named him bishop of Montepulciano-Chiusi-Pienza as well. His installation there was scheduled for 3 September.

He participated as a cardinal elector in the 2025 papal conclave that elected Pope Leo XIV.

== See also ==
- Cardinals created by Pope Francis

Catholic Church titles
Preceded by Celso Morga Iruzubieta	Titular Bishop of Alba Marittima; 6 March 2015 – 6 May 2019	Succeeded by Giovanni Gaspari
Preceded by Antonio Buoncristiani	Archbishop of Siena-Colle di Val d'Elsa-Montalcino; 6 May 2019 –	Incumbent
