= Fidelis (bishop of Mérida) =

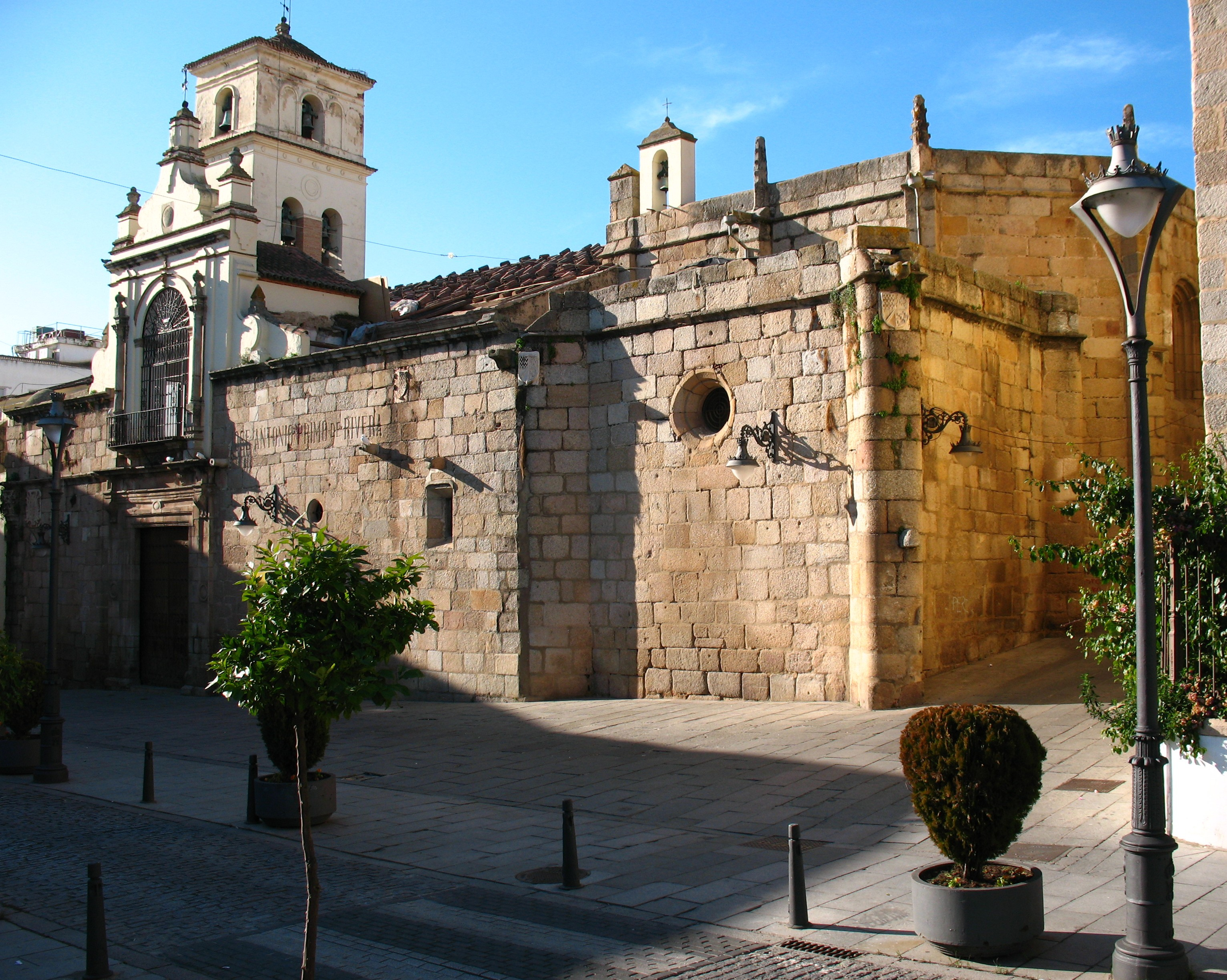
Fidelis (bishop of Mérida)

Fidelis was the Bishop of Mérida flourishing probably in the 550s and 560s.

Fidelis was a Greek who was hired out by his parents to a merchant venture to Spain in the mid sixth century, arriving in Mérida, where his mother's brother, Paul, was bishop. As it was customary of merchants to greet the bishop with gifts upon their arrival, it is not surprising that Paul discovered his nephew on one of these trading missions.

Paul had amassed a large fortune which by law he was obligated to give to the diocese, but which he kept for himself. He consecrated Fidelis as his successor and forced the clergy to accept this by threatening to bequeath his wealth to others if Fidelis was not his successor. Fidelis was willed the private wealth and when public opposition tried to force him to abandon taking up his see, he threatened to remove his inherited wealth. He was consequently accepted as bishop.

With the immense wealth he had at his disposal and Mérida the richest diocese in Spain, Fidelis went about repairing the buildings of the city, restoring the collapsed episcopal palace — and decorating lavishly with marble — and reconstructing the basilica of Saint Eulalia with two added towers. The foundations of Fidelis' church are full preserved and have been uncovered by archaeologists today.

Fidelis bequeathed all his inherited wealth to the church on his death, and he returned any unredeemed bonds to his debtors on his deathbed. The Vitas Patrum Emeritensium records, in a fashion borrowed from the Dialogues of Gregory the Great, the visions Fidelis saw on his deathbed. The tradition of the bishop as a source of credit as well as the ambitious building programme were continued by Fidelis' successor, Masona.
