= Zeno (bishop of Mérida) =

Zeno, a Greek, was the Bishop of Mérida in the late fifth century. Though he had traditionally been ascribed the see of Seville, it has now been shown that he was in fact metropolitan of Lusitania and thus bishop of the provincial capital of Mérida. The dates of his episcopate are unknown besides the date of 483 and the fact of a surviving letter from Pope Felix III (483–492).

Pope Simplicius was so impressed by his administration of his diocese that he desired to install him as papal vicar in southern Spain and strengthen his position there. It is possible that Simplicius was responding to the conquests of the Suevi in Lusitania. Several diocese had been lost to the barbarians and the pope's letter refers vaguely to the terminos (boundaries) of the Apostles. The provincial boundaries of Lusitania may have been under consideration and Simplicius may have wished to augment Zeno's authority to deal with the Suevi.

According to an inscription dated to 483 and surviving in a ninth-century copy, Zeno and Salla, a Gothic official, repaired the walls of Mérida and the bridge over the Guadiana there.

== Sources ==
- Thompson, E. A. Romans and Barbarians: The Decline of the Western Empire. Madison: University of Wisconsin Press, 1982. ISBN 0-299-08700-X.
