= Antonio Montero Moreno =

Spanish Roman Catholic prelate (1928–2022)

The Most Reverend Antonio Montero Moreno
- Archbishop Emeritus of Mérida-Badajoz
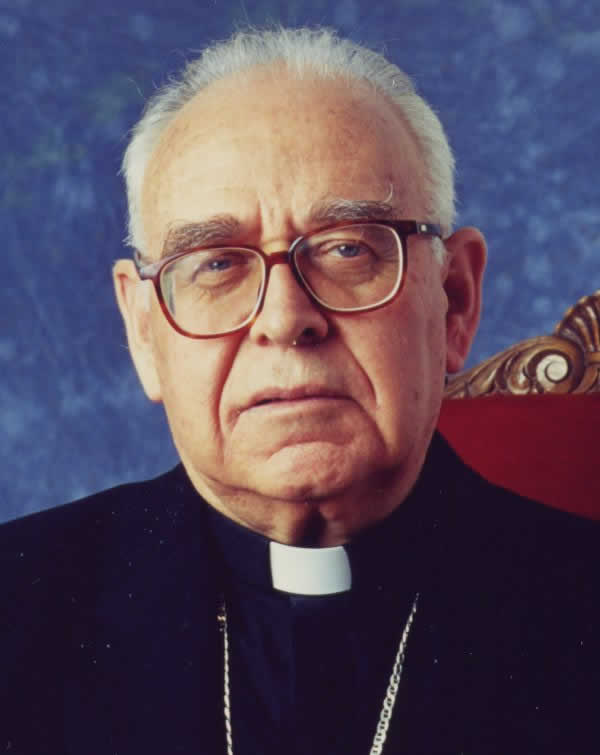
- Church: Roman Catholic Church
- Archdiocese: Mérida-Badajoz
- See: Mérida-Badajoz
- Appointed: 12 October 1994
- Term ended: 9 July 2004
- Predecessor: Post created
- Successor: Santiago García Aracil
- Previous posts: Auxiliary Bishop of Seville (1969–1980); Titular Bishop of Regiana (1969–1980); Bishop of Badajoz (1980–1994)

Orders
- Ordination: 19 May 1951
- Consecration: 17 May 1969 by José Bueno y Monreal

Personal details
- Born: 28 August 1928 Churriana de la Vega, Spain
- Died: 16 June 2022 (aged 93) Seville, Spain
- Education: Pontifical University of Salamanca; Pontifical Gregorian University
- Motto: Parare Vias Domini
- Coat of arms

Antonio Montero Moreno (28 August 1928 – 16 June 2022) was a Spanish Roman Catholic prelate.

Montero Moreno was born in Churriana de la Vega and was ordained to the priesthood in 1951. He served as auxiliary bishop of the Roman Catholic Archdiocese of Seville and was titular bishop of Regiana from 1969 to 1980. Montero then served as bishop of the Roman Catholic Diocese of Badajoz, Spain. from 1980 to 1994. He then served as archbishop of the Roman Catholic Archdiocese of Mérida-Badajoz, Spain, from 1994 until his retirement in 2004.

Catholic Church titles
Preceded by Post created	Archbishop of Mérida-Badajoz; 1994–2004	Succeeded by Santiago García Aracil
Preceded by Doroteo Fernández y Fernández	Bishop of Badajoz; 1980–1994	Succeeded by Post abolished
Preceded by Andreas Peter Cornelius Sol	Titular Bishop of Regiana; 1969–1980	Succeeded by José Vicente Henriquez Andueza
Preceded by —	Auxiliary Bishop of Seville; 1969–1980	Succeeded by —
