= Santa Maria del Buon Consiglio =

- Church of Saint Mary of Good Counsel
- Chiesa di Santa Maria del Buon Consiglio a Porta Furba
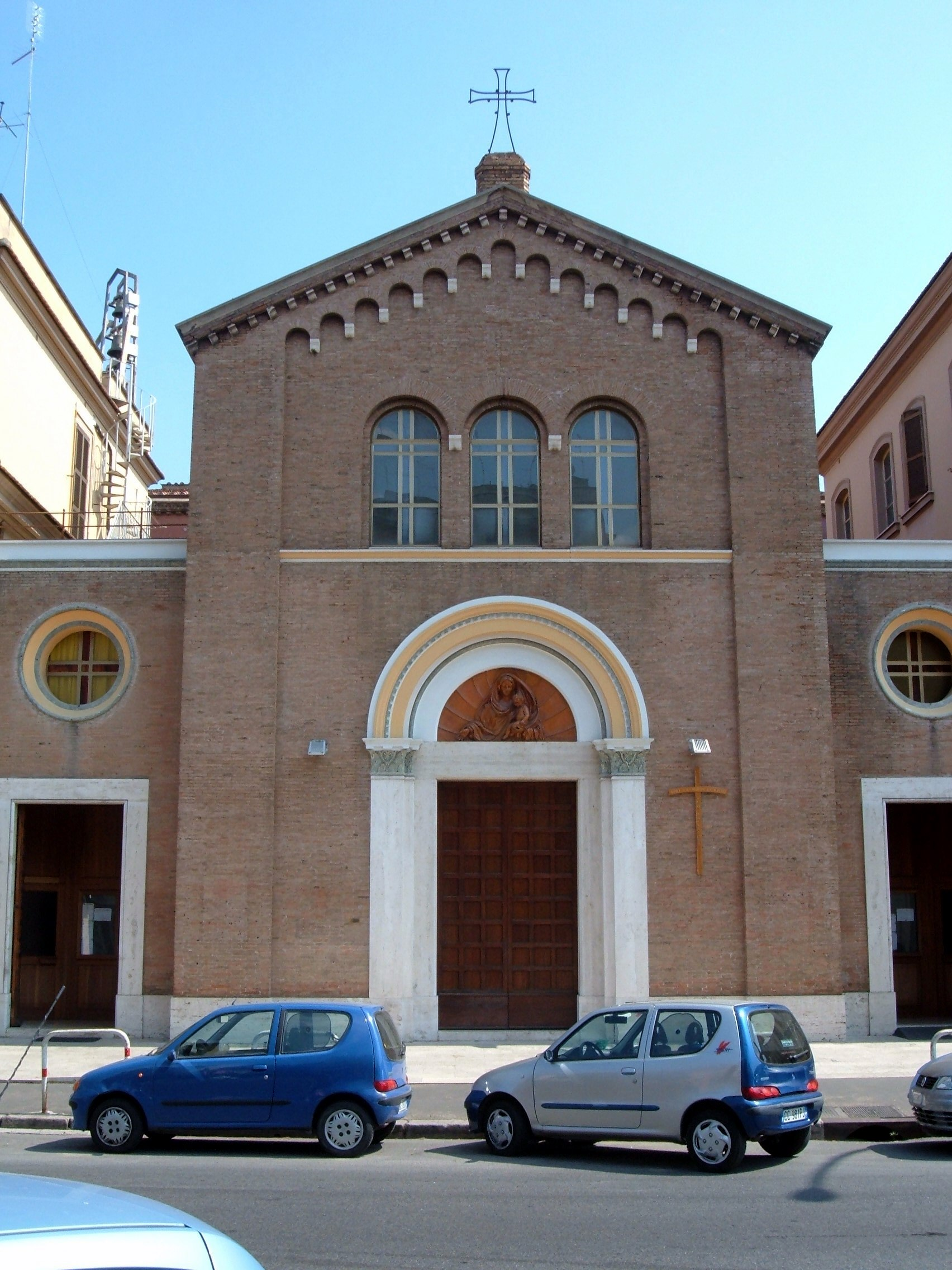
- Facade
- Click on the map for a fullscreen view
- 41°51′49″N 12°33′01″E
- Location: Via Tuscolana 613, Rome
- Country: Italy
- Language: Italian
- Denomination: Catholic
- Tradition: Roman Rite
- Website: parrocchiasmbc.it

History
- Status: Titular church
- Founder: Pope Benedict XV
- Dedication: Mary, mother of Jesus (Our Lady of Good Counsel)
- Consecrated: 9 April 1916

Architecture
- Architect: Costatino Schneider
- Style: Romanesque Revival
- Groundbreaking: 1914
- Completed: 1916

Administration
- Diocese: Rome

The church of Santa Maria del Buon Consiglio is a Catholic place of worship located on Via Tuscolana serving the parish of that name. Its eponymous patron is Our Lady of Good Counsel.

== History ==
The parish was erected on 26 July 1919 by Pope Benedict XV and entrusted to the diocesan clergy of the Diocese of Rome. The building was inaugurated on 9 April 1916 by Archbishop Vittorio Ranuzzi de' Bianchi, papal majordomo.

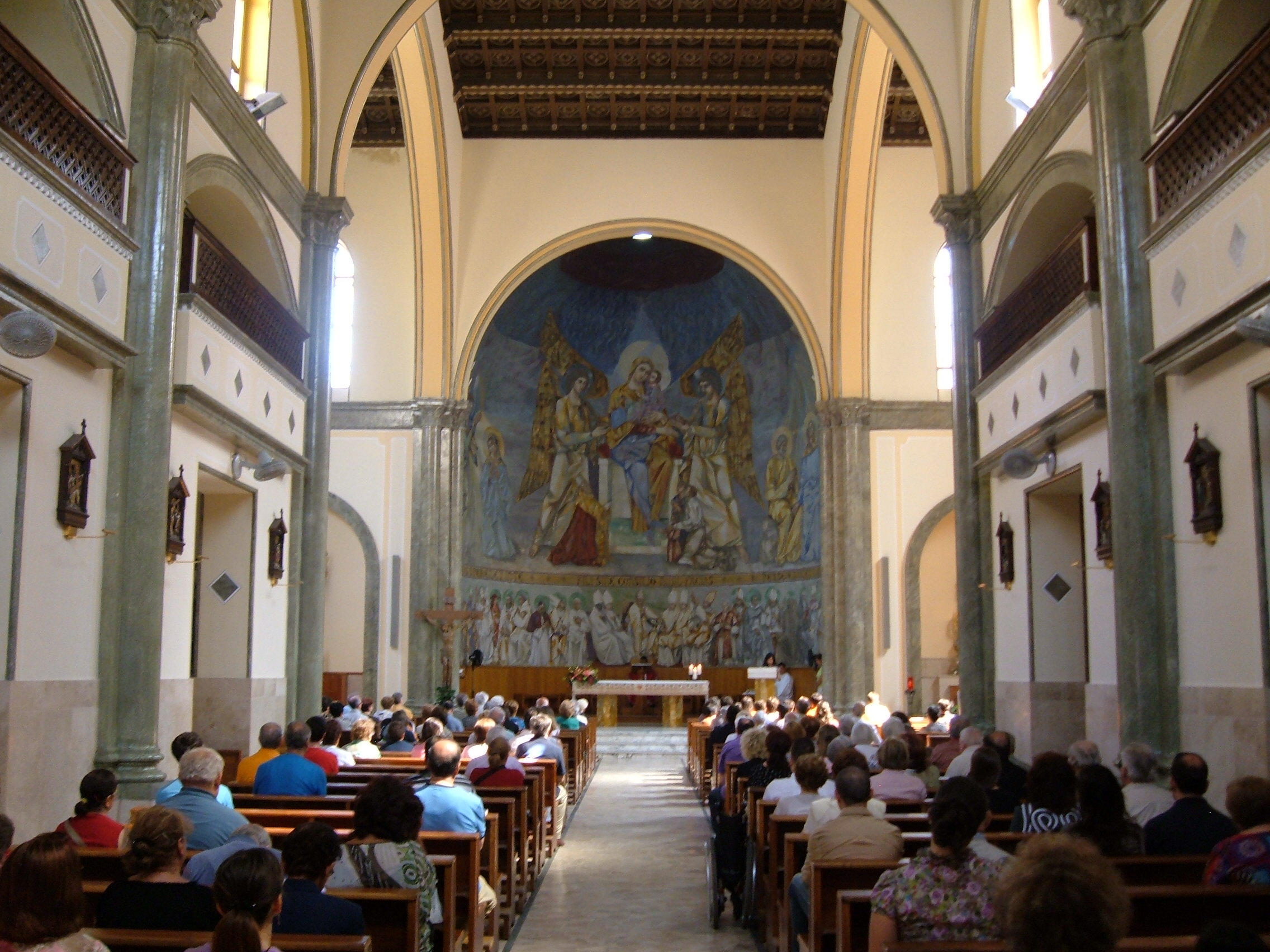
View of interior

The neo-Romanesque structure was built to the designs of Costatino Schneider, prompted by the concerns of Pope Pius X for the development of this sector of the city and thanks to his legacy, not long after his death in August 1914, construction was completed in 1916. Its brick facade fits closely between the parish school and offices on either side. It combines a variety of medieval elements. A terracotta bas-relief of the Madonna sits in a lunette above the centered doorway. Above are three windows crowned by a pitched roof in the style known as copertura a capanna with many decorative projections. Two doors corresponding to the interior side aisles flank the center portion of the facade, the narrow and low shapes serving to emphasize the form of the facade. The interior of the church was expanded and much altered in 1954–55 according to designs by Paolo Stefani.

From 1989 to 1992, the parochial vicar was Rev. Augusto Paolo Lojudice, later a cardinal and Archbishop of Siena. Pope John Paul II visited the church on 6 December 1992.

Pope Francis established the church of Santa Maria del Buon Consiglio as a cardinal's titular church on 28 November 2020.

== Cardinal Protectors ==
- Augusto Paolo Lojudice, Archbishop of Siena (28 November 2020 – present)
