= Saint Eulalia (Waterhouse painting) =

Painting by John William Waterhouse

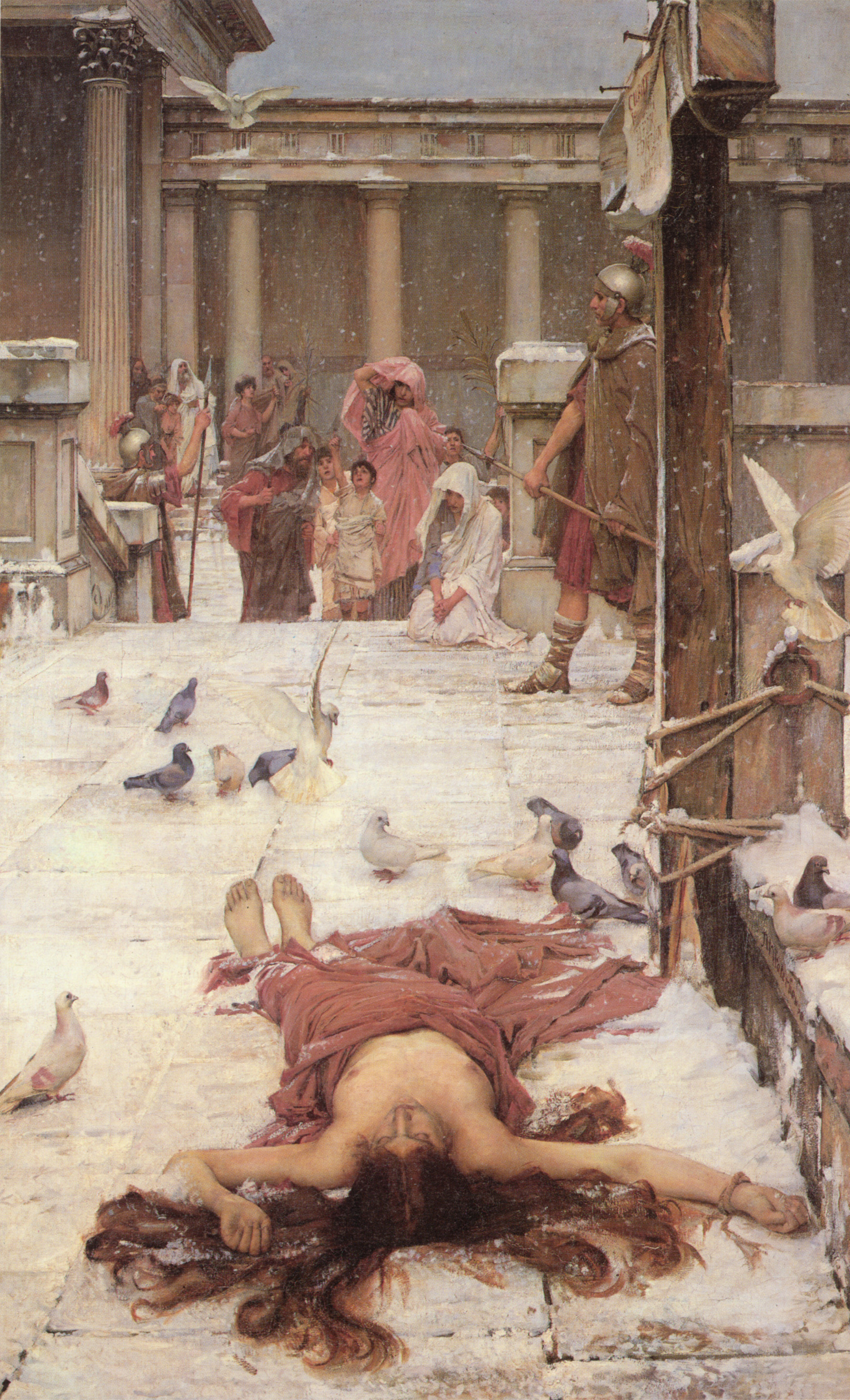
- Artist: John William Waterhouse
- Year: 1885
- Medium: oil on canvas
- Dimensions: 188.6 cm × 117.5 cm (74.3 in × 46.3 in)
- Location: Tate Britain, London

Saint Eulalia is an oil painting on canvas in the Pre-Raphaelite style, created in 1885 by English artist John William Waterhouse, depicting the aftermath of the death of Eulalia of Mérida. It is now in Tate Britain, London, but in 2025 not on display.

== History ==
A very daring composition, this is one of Waterhouse's most unusual, and consequently most striking, oil paintings. The corpse is dramatically foreshortened, and the white of the snow contrasts with that of Eulalia's naked flesh – the 12-year-old girl seems singularly out of place for a Waterhouse picture. His choice of configuration – situating the corpse across the front and leaving so much of the central canvas unoccupied – was risky but it worked: by placing all the background figures in the distance, he concentrated the viewer's gaze on the naked body. The nudity was also groundbreaking for Waterhouse – and something that could have laid him open to criticism – but his sensitive handling of the subject, the youth of the saint, and the historical context of the painting allowed him to escape the critics' pens. A comparison of the painting with the artist's study (below) shows important changes – the male figure is moved back, the snow is no longer falling and the saint's breasts are no longer partially covered by snow. These changes increase the sense of stillness and isolation.

According to legend, the snow was believed to have been sent by God as a shroud to cover the saint's nakedness; the dove, seen flying upwards near the crowd of mourners, is indicative of Eulalia's soul rising to Heaven, having flown out of her mouth.

The painting aroused considerable admiration. Bram Dijkstra quotes an anonymous reviewer in The Magazine of Art in 1885 writing

The artist's conception is full of power and originality. Its whole force is centred in the pathetic dignity of the outstretched figure, so beautiful in its helplessness and pure serenity, so affecting in its forlorn and wintry shroud, so noble in the grace and strength of its presentiment. The tone of the dark, almost livid flesh is finely realised, and the drawing of the foreshortened figure displays mastery skill; the disposition of the body and the curves of the lower limbs are circumstances of real subtlety of design in this beautiful composition.
