= San Paolo alla Regola =

Catholic church in Rome

- Church of Saint Paul in Regola
- Chiesa di San Paolo alla Regola
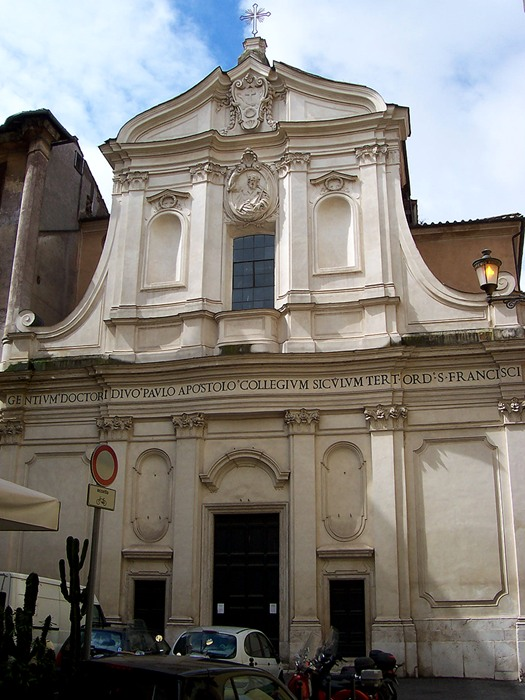
- Facade

- Location within Rome Location within Rome
- 41°53′34″N 12°28′25″E
- Location: Piazza di S. Paolo alla Regola 32, Rome
- Country: Italy
- Language: Italian
- Denomination: Catholic
- Tradition: Roman Rite

History
- Status: titular church
- Founded: 13th century
- Dedication: Paul the Apostle

Architecture
- Architectural type: Baroque
- Completed: 17th century

Administration
- Diocese: Rome

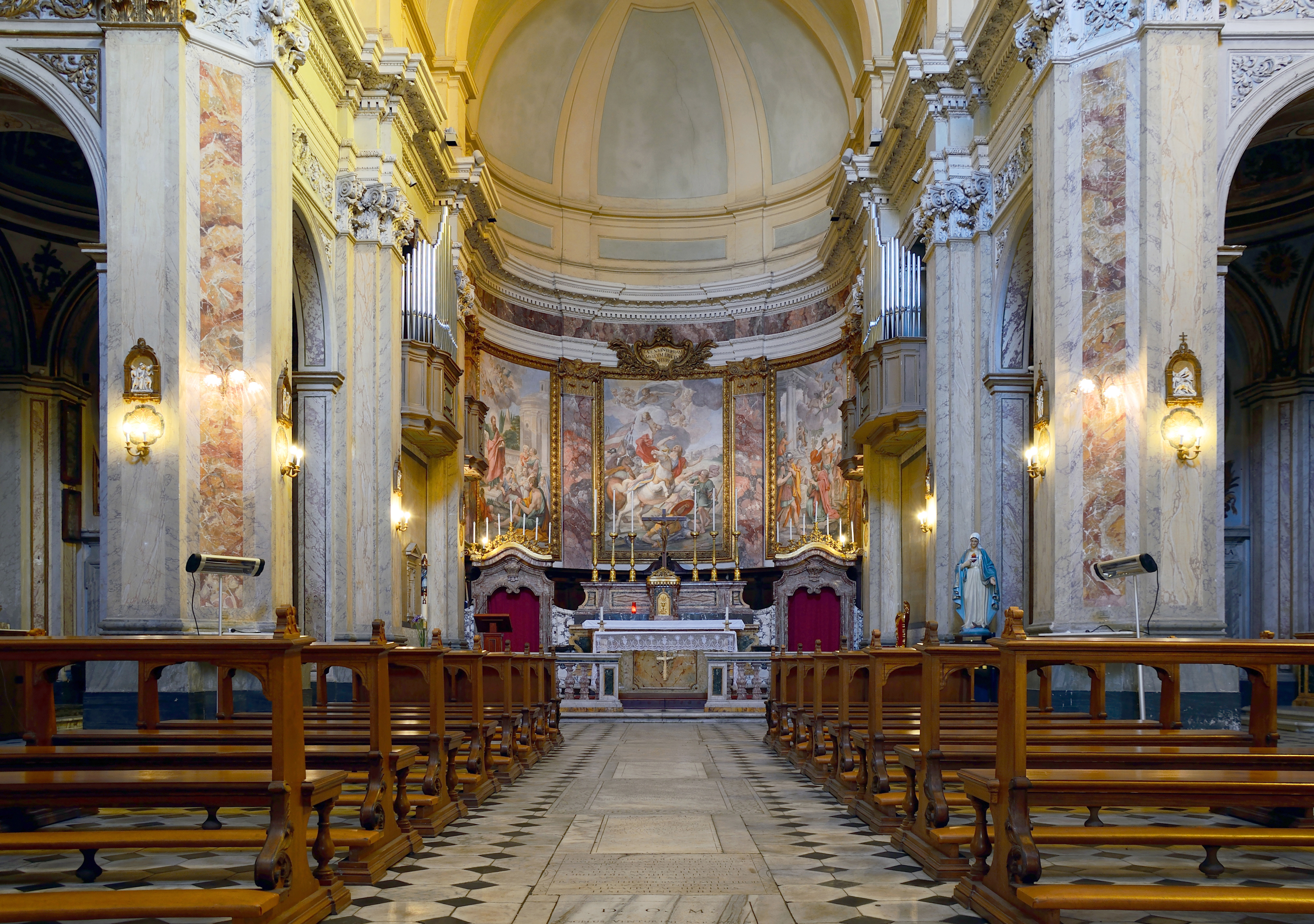
Intern

San Paolo alla Regola, a church in the Regola area of Rome, was made a cardinalate deaconry by Pope Pius XII in 1946. Its present Cardinal-Deacon, since 21 November 2010, is Francesco Monterisi, archpriest emeritus of the Basilica of Saint Paul Outside the Walls.

It is the only church dedicated to Saint Paul within the Walls of Rome.

== List of Cardinal Deacons ==
- Alojzije Stepinac (1952-1960; never possessed)
- Giuseppe Fietta (1958-1960)
- Michael Browne, O.P. (1962-1971)
- Francesco Monterisi (2010-)

== Underground ==
Underneath Sao Paolo are ruins of what is now a subterranean house.
