= Paul (bishop of Mérida) =

Paul was the metropolitan bishop of Mérida in the mid-sixth century (fl. 540s/550s). He was a Greek physician who had travelled to Mérida, where there may have been a Greek expatriate community. Certainly enough Greek clergy were travelling to Spain in the early sixth century that Pope Hormisdas wrote to the Spanish bishops in 518 explaining what to do if Greeks still adhering to the Acacian heresy desired to enter communion with the local church.

At some point in his episcopate, he performed a Caesarian section to save a woman's life. In gratitude, her husband, the richest senator in Lusitania, left all his possessions as a legacy to Paul, as well as immediately giving him one half. Though canon law dictated that all gifts to bishops passed to the Church, Paul kept the legacy as his private possession.

Paul's sister's son, Fidelis, was hired out as a boy to a trading vessel on its way to Spain. When the merchants arrived in Mérida, they approached the bishop for an audience, as was customary, and Paul discovered his nephew. Paul immediately took Fidelis under his wing. Contrary to canon law, he consecrated Fidelis as his successor in the bishopric and tried to force the clergy to accept his decision by threatening to withhold his vast private wealth which technically belonged to the Church. Paul offered to leave the wealth to Fidelis and after Fidelis' death to the Church, but the bishops initially refused. They were forced to relent when he threatened to remove all his wealth and dispose of otherwise; the riches made Mérida by far the richest see in Spain. Fidelis, in accordance with Paul's wishes, left the wealth to the Church at his death. Paul's later biographer, the author of the Vitas Patrum Emeritensium, justified the bishop's transgressions of canon law by saying that the ideas had been relevante sibi Spiritu sancto: "revealed to him by the Holy Spirit." The VPE, as it is abbreviated, refers to Paul as a saint.

Paul is often held up by modern historians as an example of the poor image the Arian church had of Catholics on account of his illegal activities, but he is also used as proof of the close ties between the East and West which still existed for Spain, at least in the sixth century. He also demonstrates that there was little prejudice which would prevent foreigners from attaining high position in a Spanish city under the Visigothic monarchy.
