= Huércanos =

- Municipality
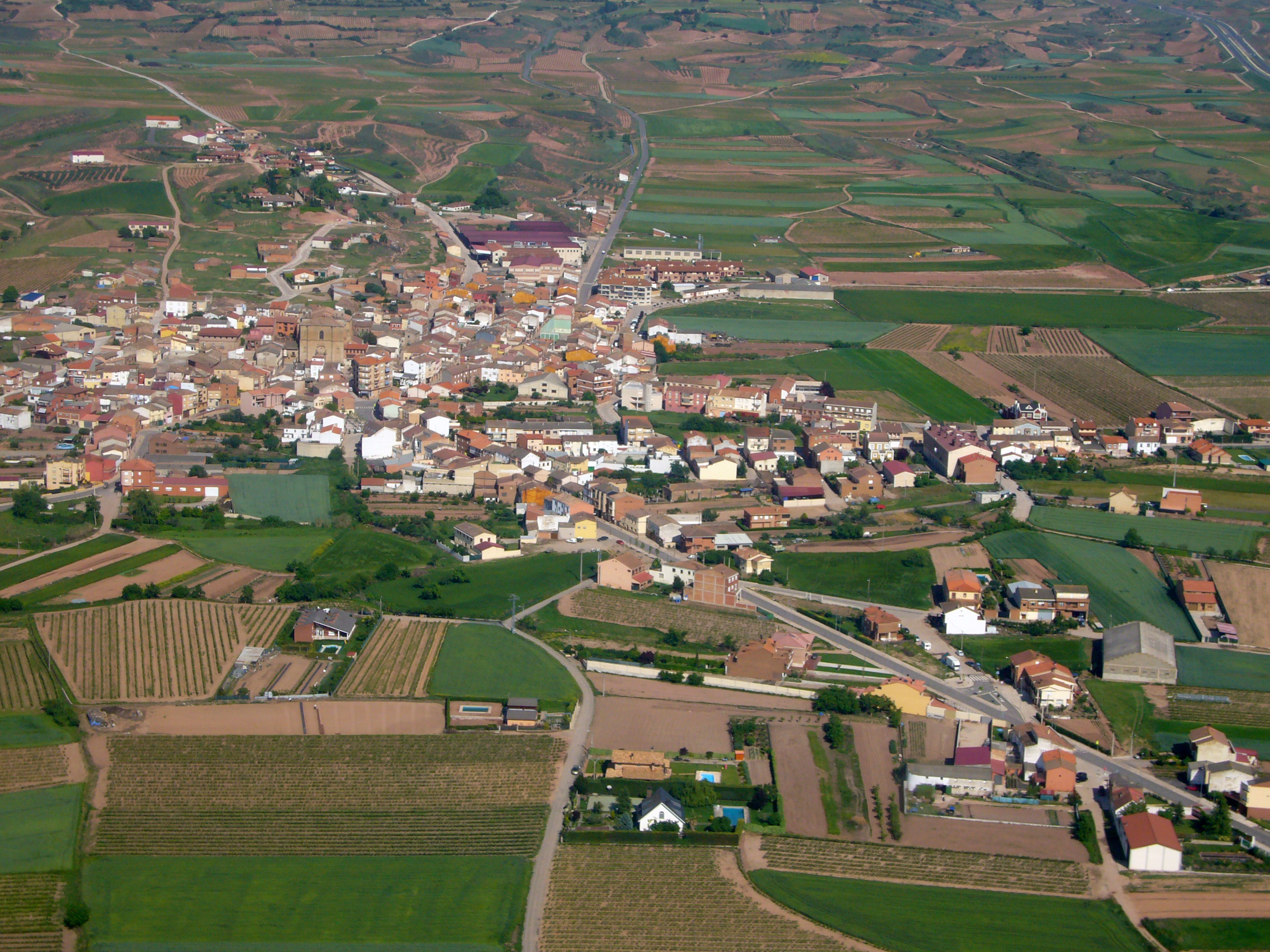
- Airview of Huércanos

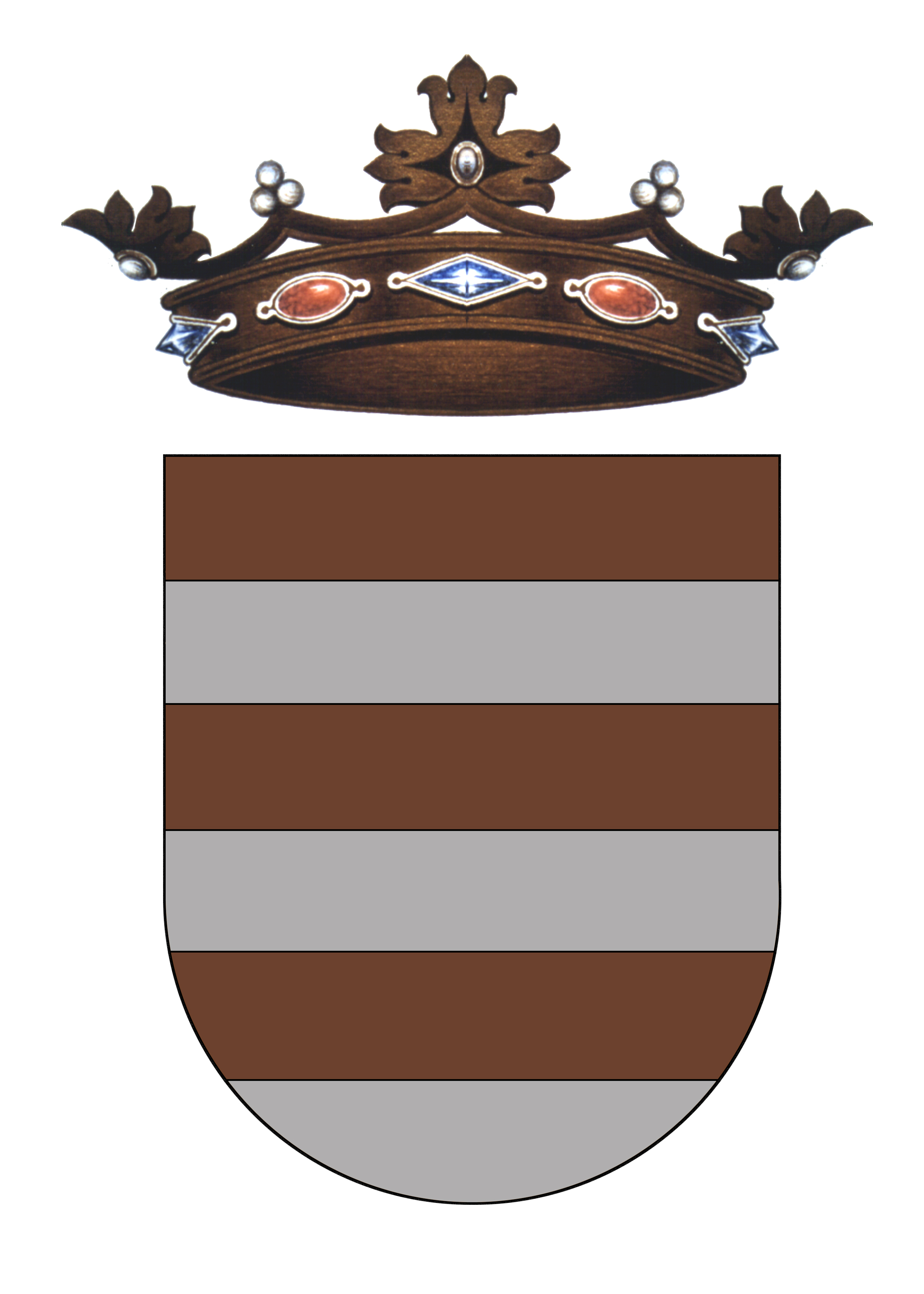
- Coat of arms

- Location within La Rioja, Spain Location within Spain
- Coordinates: 42°25′43″N 2°41′39″W
- Country: Spain
- Autonomous community: La Rioja
- Comarca: Nájera

Government
  - Mayor: Roberto Varona Alonso (PP)

Area
  - Total: 21.48 km^{2} (8.29 sq mi)
- Elevation: 512 m (1,680 ft)

Population (2025-01-01)
  - Total: 856
- Demonym(s): pochanqueros, as
- Postal code: 26314
- Website: www.huercanos.org

Huércanos is a village in the province and autonomous community of La Rioja, Spain. The municipality covers an area of 21.48 square kilometres (8.29 sq mi) and as of 2011 had a population of 917 people.
