= Santiago García Aracil =

Spanish Catholic archbishop (1940–2018)

- Archbishop of Mérida–Badajoz
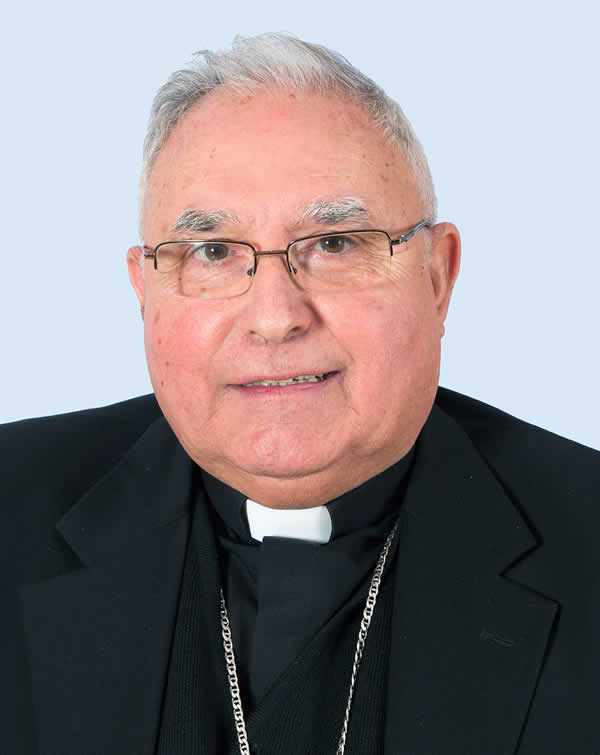
- Church: Catholic Church
- Archdiocese: Archdiocese of Mérida–Badajoz
- In office: 9 July 2004 – 21 May 2015
- Predecessor: Antonio Montero Moreno
- Successor: Celso Morga Iruzubieta
- Previous posts: Bishop of Jaén (1988-2004); Titular Bishop of Croae (1984-1988); Auxiliary Bishop of Valencia (1984-1988)

Orders
- Ordination: 21 September 1963
- Consecration: 27 December 1984 by Miguel Roca Cabanellas

Personal details
- Born: 8 May 1940 Valencia, Province of Valencia, Spanish State
- Died: 28 December 2018 (aged 78) Valencia, Valencian Community, Spain

Santiago García Aracil (8 May 1940 – 28 December 2018) was a Spanish Catholic archbishop.

== Biography ==
García Aracil was born in Valencia, Spain and was ordained to the priesthood in 1963. He served as titular bishop of Croæ and auxiliary bishop of the Roman Catholic Archdiocese of Valencia, Spain, from 1984 to 1988. He then served as bishop of the Roman Catholic Diocese of Jaén, Spain, from 1988 to 2004. Finally he served as archbishop of the Roman Catholic Archdiocese of Mérida-Badajoz, Spain, from 2004 to 2015, when he resigned for reasons of age.
