= Ignacy Jeż =

20th-century Polish Catholic bishop

- Bishop emeritus of Koszalin-Kołobrzeg
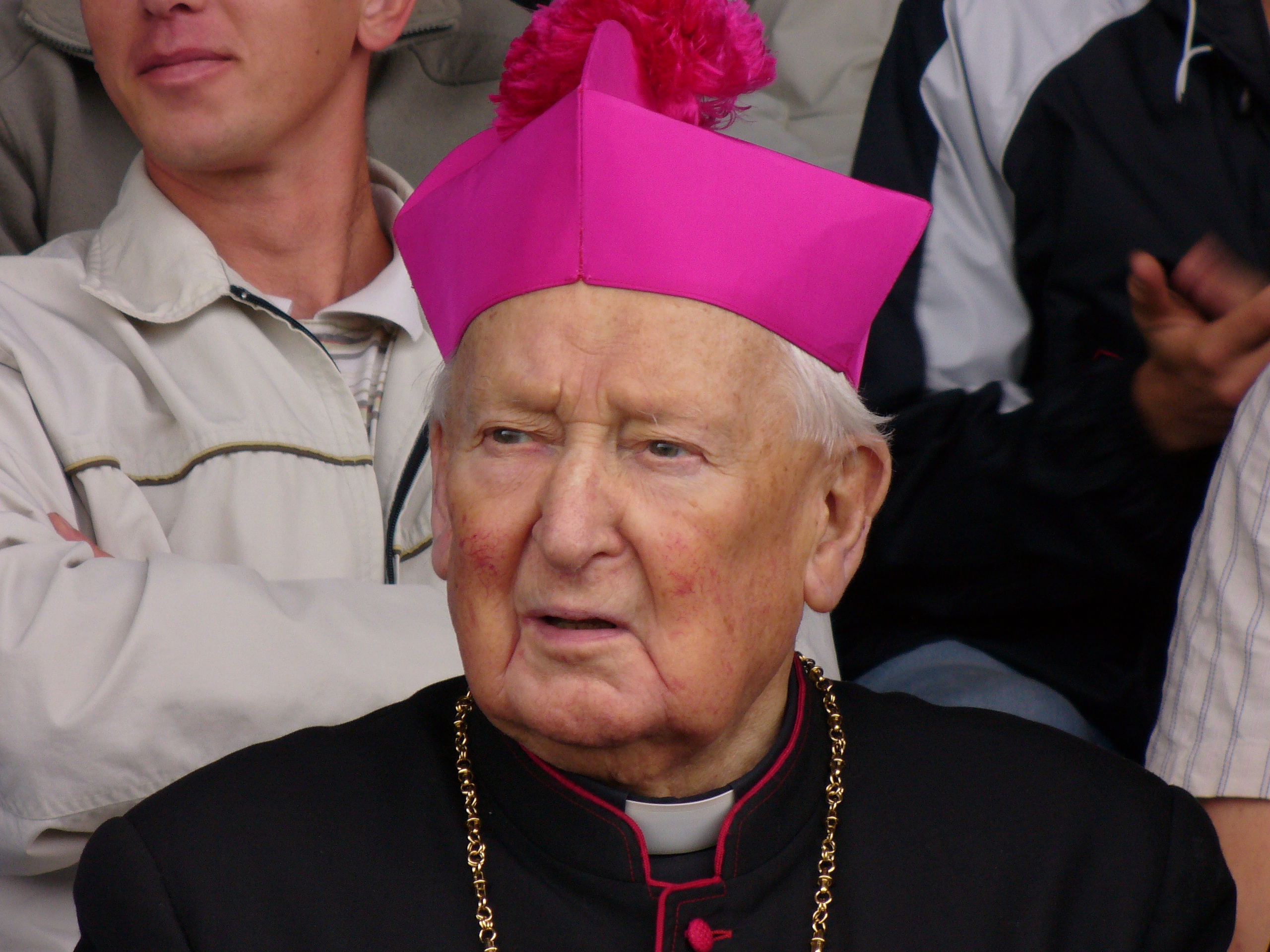
- Installed: 5 June 1960
- Term ended: 1 February 1992

Personal details
- Born: Ignacy Ludwik Jeż; 31 July 1914 Radomyśl Wielki, Subcarpathian Voivodeship, Poland
- Died: 16 October 2007 (aged 93) Vatican City

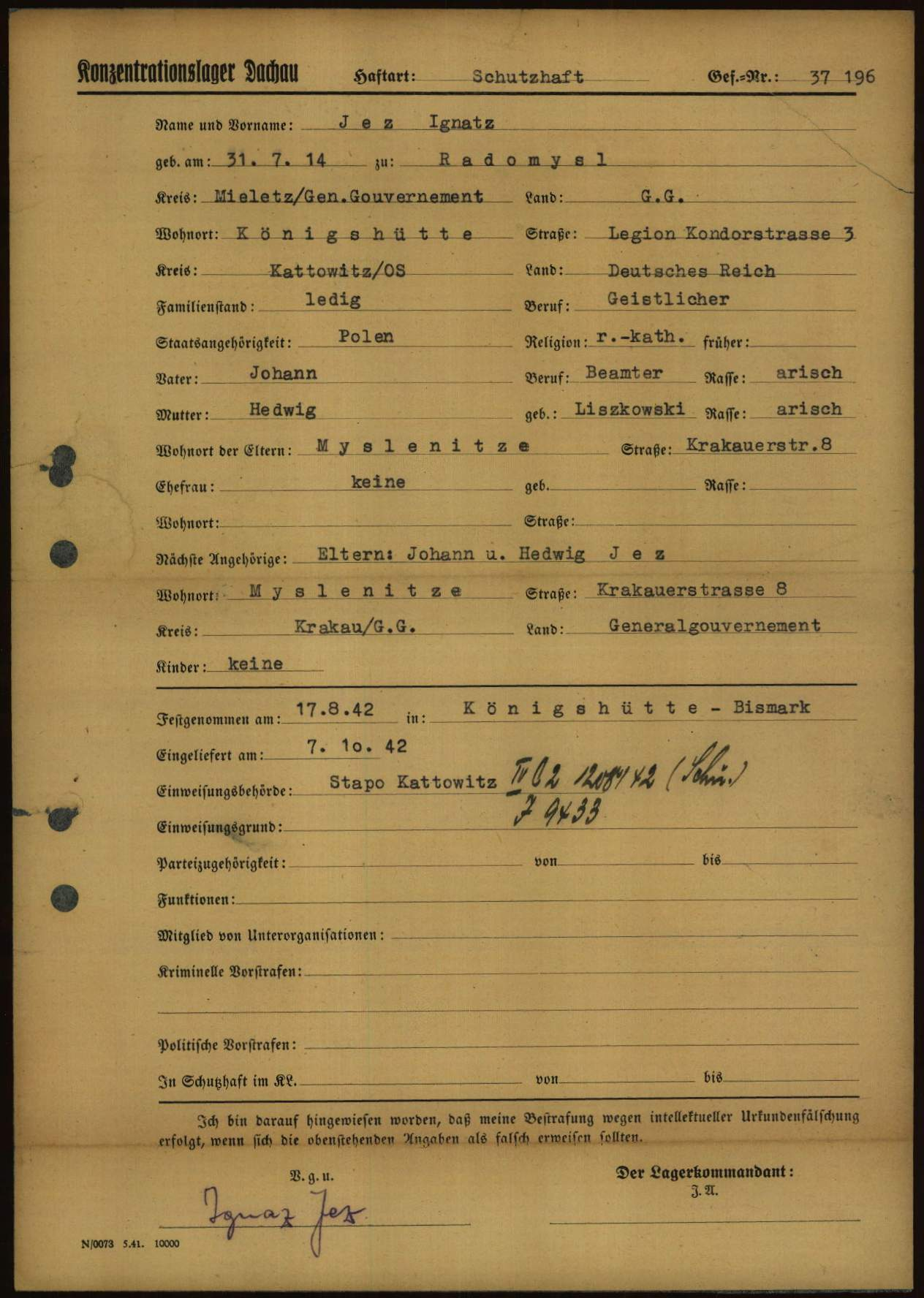
Registration form of Ignacy Jeż as a prisoner at Dachau Nazi Concentration Camp

Ignacy Ludwik Jeż (31 July 1914, Radomyśl Wielki – 16 October 2007) was a Polish Catholic prelate who served as the Bishop of Koszalin-Kołobrzeg. Jeż was born in the Polish town of Radomyśl Wielki on 31 July 1914. He was ordained a Catholic priest on 20 June 1937. In 1942 he was sent first to Niemców labour camp and then interned in Dachau concentration camp as prisoner no. 37196, where he met fellow priest Joseph Kentenich. After the camp was liberated by the American forces in 1945, Jeż returned to priesthood, and from 1946 until 1960 he was the director of a Catholic Gymnasium in Katowice. On 5 June 1960, under Pope John XXIII, Cardinal Stefan Wyszyński and future Cardinal Bolesław Kominek appointed Jeż Titular Bishop of Alba Maritima. In 1967 he was elevated to Auxiliary Bishop of the Catholic Archdiocese of Wrocław. In 1972 he was appointed Bishop of Koszalin-Kołobrzeg, in northern Poland. He held this post until 1 February 1992, when, at the age of 77, his resignation request was accepted by Pope John Paul II.

Jeż died on 16 October 2007 in Rome, Italy, the day before the announcement that Pope Benedict XVI had planned to make him a cardinal (in the consistory of 24 November 2007).

== Work ==
Jeż was one of the pioneers of re-initiating post-war German-Polish relations. His widespread work led him to become an honorary canon (Ehrendomherr) of the Bavarian Diocese of Würzburg, and in 2005 the President of Germany Horst Köhler awarded him the Grand Cross of Germany's federal order of merit, the Bundesverdienstkreuz. The following year the German Bundestag awarded him the Preis für Zivilcourage, "for his courageous behaviour as a young priest during the Nazi occupation of Poland". In 2007 he received the Grand Cross of the Polonia Restituta.

Jeż was made an honorary citizen of several cities and municipalities: Radomyśl Wielki (since 2004), Koszalin (since 1994), Slupsk (since 2006), Połczyn Zdrój (since 2006), Katowice (2007) and Kolobrzeg (since 2008).

Jeż was a Knight of the Order of the Smile.
