= Eulalia of Mérida =

3rd-century Spanish saint

Saint Eulalia of Mérida
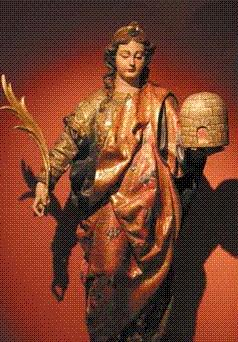
- Image of Santa Eulalia in Merida Cathedral

Virgin martyr
- Born: c. AD 290; Mérida, Spain
- Died: c. AD 304; Mérida
- Venerated in: Catholic Church, Eastern Orthodox Church
- Canonized: 304
- Major shrine: Cathedral of San Salvador
- Feast: 10 December
- Attributes: cross, stake, and dove
- Patronage: Mérida, Spain; Oviedo, Spain; runaways; torture victims; widows; inclement weather

Eulalia of Mérida (Augusta Emerita in 292 - Augusta Emerita 10 December, 304) was a young Roman Christian martyred in Augusta Emerita, the capital of Lusitania (modern Mérida, Spain), during the Persecution of Christians under Diocletian. Other views place her death at the time of Trajan Decius (AD 249–51). There is debate whether Saint Eulalia of Barcelona, whose story is similar, is the same person. Up till the proclamation of James, son of Zebedee, Eulalia was invoked as the protector of Christian troops in the Reconquista and was patron of the territories of Spain during their formation.

== Hagiography ==
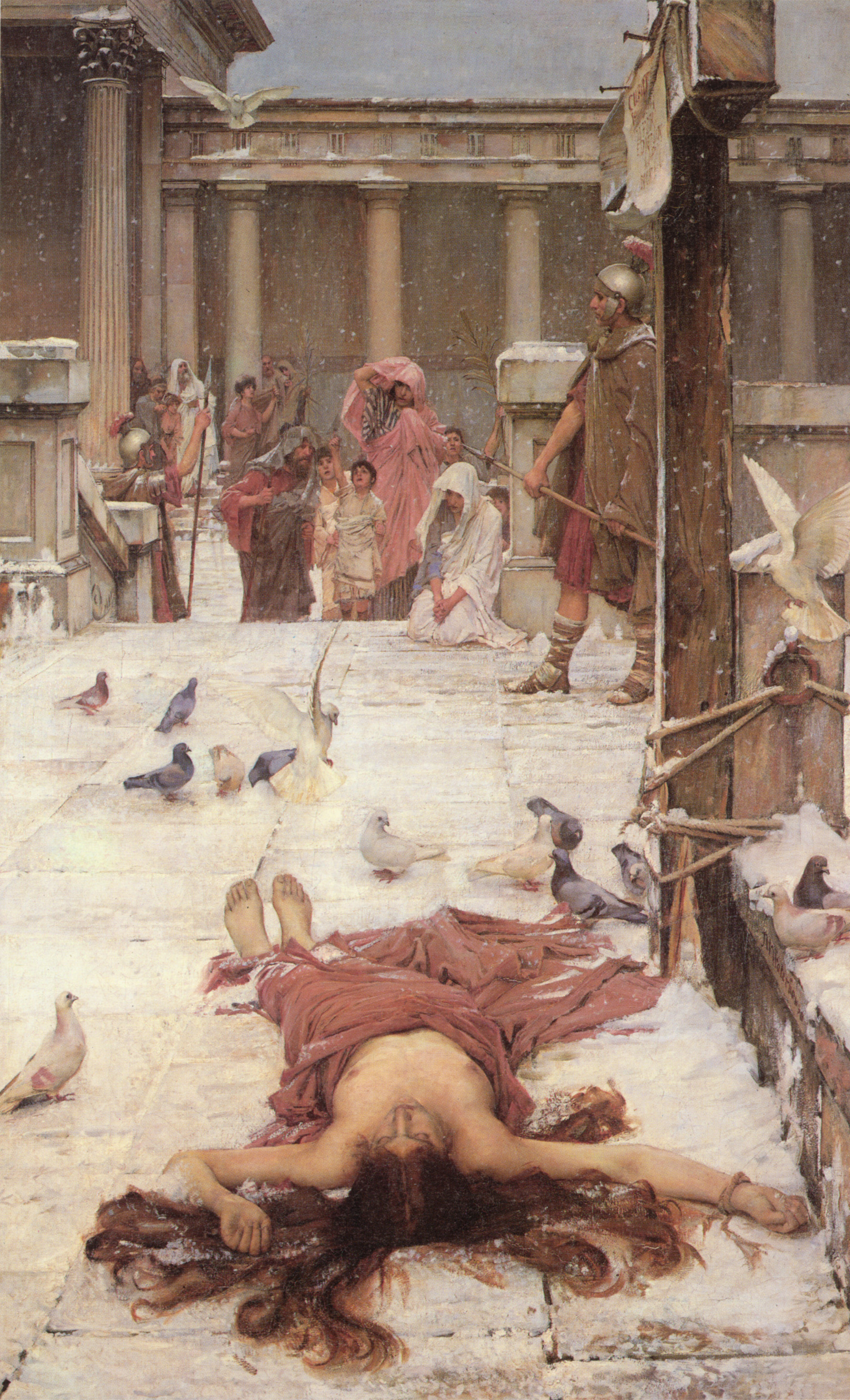
Saint Eulalia, by John William Waterhouse, 1885, Tate collection.

Eulalia was a devout Christian virgin, aged 12–14, whose mother sequestered her in the countryside in AD 304 because all citizens were required to avow faith in the Roman gods. Eulalia ran away to the law court of the governor Dacian at Emerita, professed herself a Christian, insulted the pagan gods and emperor Maximian, and challenged the authorities to martyr her. The judge's attempts at flattery and bribery failed. According to the Spanish-Roman poet Prudentius of the fifth century, who devoted book 3 of his Peristephanon ("About martyrs") to Eulalia, she said:

Isis, Apollo, Venus nihil est,
Maximianus et ipse nihil:
illa nihil, quia facta manu,
hic, manuum quia facta colit.

("Isis, Apollo, Venus –
they are naught; Maximian himself too, is naught;
because they are work of men's hands, both worthless, both naught.
He, because he reveres the works of hands.)"

Eulalia was then stripped by the soldiers, tortured with hooks and torches, and burnt at the stake, suffocating from smoke inhalation. She taunted her torturers all the while, (Note: Eulalia signifies "well-spoken", an attribute of orators.) and as she expired a dove flew out of her mouth. This frightened away the soldiers and allowed a miraculous snow to cover her nakedness, its whiteness indicating her sainthood.

A shrine over Eulalia's tomb was soon erected. Veneration of Eulalia was already popular with Christians by 350; Prudentius' poem increased her fame and relics from her were distributed through Iberia. Bishop Fidelis of Mérida rebuilt a basilica in her honor around 560. Her shrine was the most popular in Visigothic Spain. Around 780 her body was transferred to Oviedo by King Silo. It lies in a coffin of Arab silver donated by Alfonso VI in 1075. In 1639, she was made patron saint of Oviedo. She appears in Thieleman J. van Braght, Martyrs Mirror: An account of Those who Suffered in the Fourth Century (1660).

== Julia of Mérida ==
Often linked with Eulalia is Saint Julia of Mérida, as in the double dedication to Saints Eulalia and Julia. Julia is also said to have been a young girl martyred at Mérida in 304, in the same persecution by Diocletian, and her feast day is also celebrated on 10 December.

== See also ==
- Saint Eulalia of Mérida, patron saint archive
- Sequence of Saint Eulalia – French hagiography from 880
