= Celso Morga Iruzubieta =

Spanish prelate

The Most Reverend Celso Morga Iruzubieta
- Archbishop Emeritus of Mérida-Badajoz
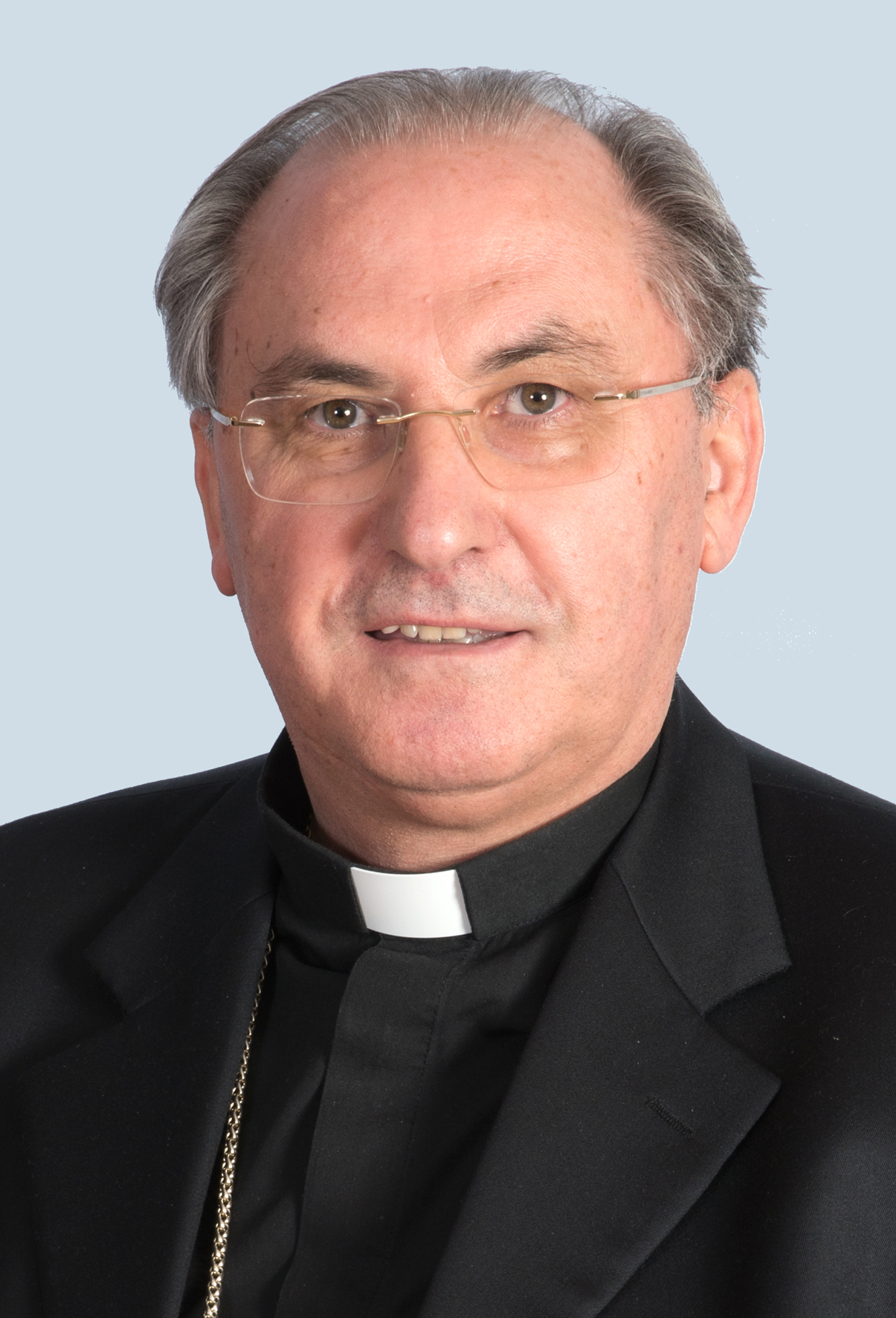
- Iruzubieta in 2017
- Church: Roman Catholic Church
- Archdiocese: Mérida-Badajoz
- See: Mérida-Badajoz
- Appointed: 21 May 2015
- Term ended: 29 June 2024
- Predecessor: Santiago García Aracil
- Previous posts: Undersecretary of the Congregation for the Clergy (2009–10); Titular Archbishop of Alba marittima (2010–14); Secretary of the Congregation for the Clergy (2010–14); Coadjutor Archbishop of Mérida-Badajoz (2014–15)

Orders
- Ordination: 24 June 1972 by Abilio del Campo y de la Bárcena
- Consecration: 5 February 2011 by Pope Benedict XVI

Personal details
- Born: 28 January 1948 (age 78) Huércanos, La Rioja, Spain
- Education: University of Navarra
- Motto: Monstra te Matrem

- Coat of arms

Styles of Celso Morga Iruzubieta
- Reference style: The Most Reverend
- Spoken style: Your Excellency
- Religious style: Archbishop

Celso Morga Iruzubieta (born 28 January 1948) is a Spanish prelate of the Catholic Church who was archbishop of Mérida-Badajoz from 2015 to 2024, after serving several months as coadjutor there. He was secretary of the Congregation for the Clergy from 2010 to 2014, after working there since 1987.

== Biography ==
Celsius Morga Iruzubieta was born on 28 January 1948 in Huércanos, La Rioja, Spain. He studied at a diocesan seminary. He was ordained a priest on 24 June 1972 for the Diocese of Calahorra y La Calzada-Logroño. He earned a doctorate in canon law at the University of Navarre. He was pastor and judicial vicar in his diocese. For four years he served in the Archdiocese of Córdoba in Argentina as an adjunct judicial vicar and professor of canon law at the diocesan seminary.

In 1987 he joined the staff of the Congregation for the Clergy, serving as head of office from 2000 to 2009 and undersecretary from 2009 to 2010. Pope Benedict XVI appointed him secretary of that Congregation and titular archbishop of Alba Maritima on 29 December 2010.

He received his episcopal consecration on 5 February 2011 from Pope Benedict, with Cardinals Angelo Sodano and Tarcisio Bertone as co-consecrators.

On 8 October 2014, Pope Francis appointed him archbishop coadjutor of Mérida-Badajoz. He succeeded as archbishop on 21 May 2015.

Pope Francis accepted his resignation on 29 June 2024.

Catholic Church titles
Preceded by Mauro Piacenza	Secretary of the Congregation for the Clergy; 2010 – 2014	Succeeded by Joël Mercier
Preceded by Santiago García Aracil	Archbishop of Mérida-Badajoz; 2015–2024	Succeeded by José Rodríguez Carballo
