= Archdiocese of Mérida–Badajoz =

Roman Catholic archdiocese in Spain

Coordinates: 38.8784°N 6.9695°W

Archdiocese of Mérida–Badajoz Archidioecesis Emeritensis Augustanus–Pacensis Archidiócesis de Mérida–Badajoz

Catholic
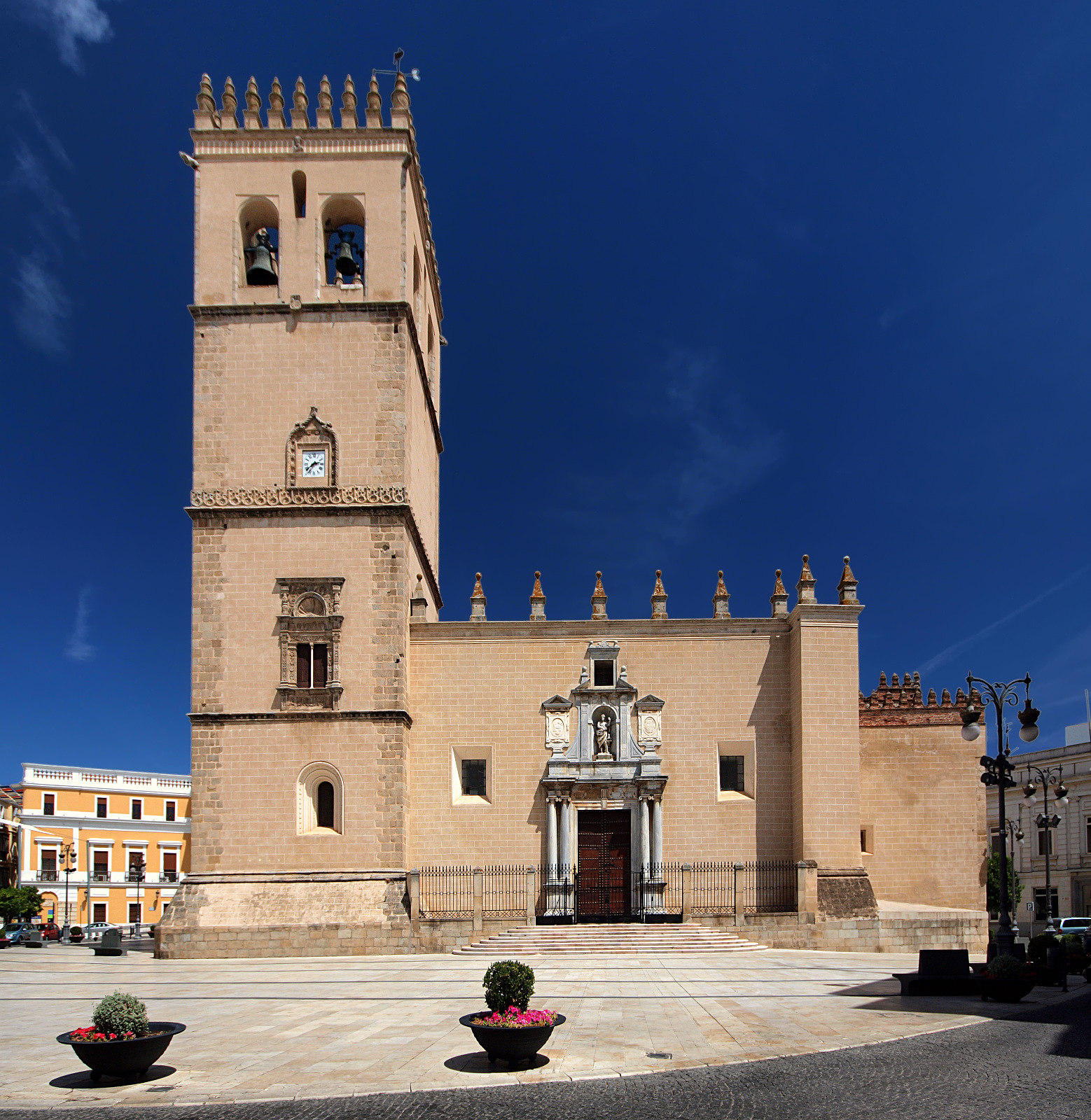
- Badajoz Cathedral

Location
- Country: Spain
- Ecclesiastical province: Mérida–Badajoz

Statistics
- Area: 17,405 km^{2} (6,720 sq mi)
- Population: Total; Catholics: (as of 2004); 585,290; 581,414 (99.3%)

Information
- Denomination: Roman Catholic
- Sui iuris church: Latin Church
- Rite: Roman Rite
- Established: 1255 (As Diocese of Badajoz); 28 July 1994 (As Archdiocese of Mérida–Badajoz)
- Cathedral: Cathedral of St John the Baptist in Badajoz
- Co-cathedral: Co-Cathedral of Saint Mary Major, Mérida

Current leadership
- Pope: Leo XIV
- Metropolitan Archbishop: José Rodríguez Carballo
- Suffragans: Diocese of Coria-Cáceres; Diocese of Plasencia
- Bishops emeritus: Celso Morga Iruzubieta

Map
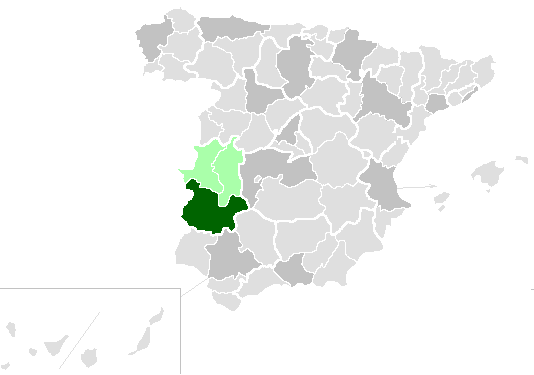

Website
- Website of the Archdiocese

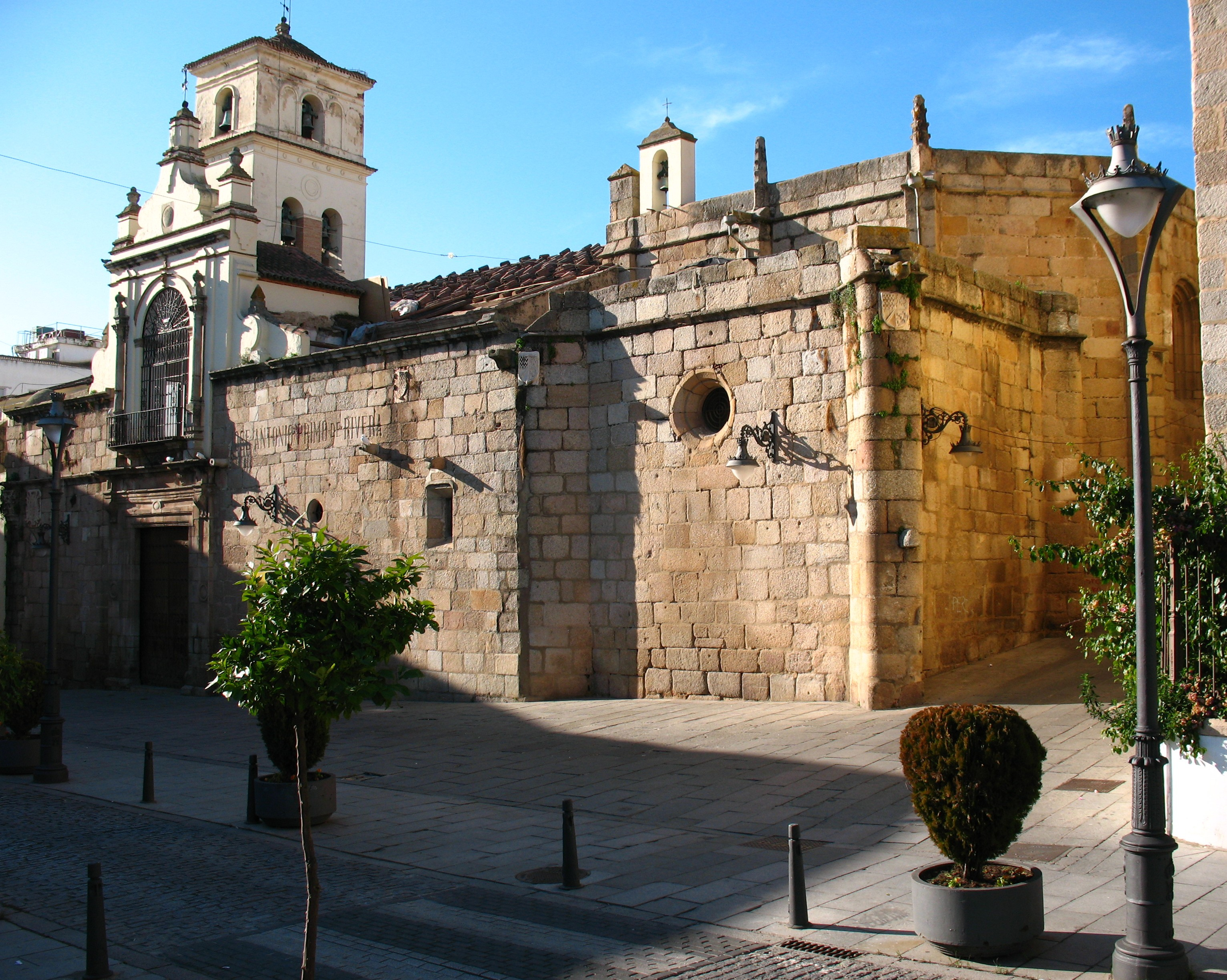
Co-cathedral of Saint Mary Major of Mérida

The Archdiocese of Mérida–Badajoz (Latin: Archidioecesis Emeritensis Augustanus–Pacensis) is a Latin Church ecclesiastical territory of the Catholic Church in Spain, created in 1255. Until 1994, it was known as the Diocese of Badajoz.

== History ==
The Diocese (dioecesis Emeritensis) was a Catholic and Arian see centred on the Spanish city of Mérida during the periods of Roman and Visigothic rule. Mérida was also the provincial capital of Lusitania.

The see prospered in the late 5th century under Zeno, a Greek, who was offered greater authority in order to defend the province from Suevic raids. At about that time the diocese fell under the control of the Visigoths and it remained a Visigothic see until the Moorish conquest of 711. Throughout that period, however, it only ever had two Gothic bishops: Masona and his successor Renovatus in the late sixth and early seventh centuries. In the mid-sixth century the see became the richest in Spain through the private wealth of bishops Paul and Fidelis, Greek uncle and nephew. Under these four, the city was ruled de facto by the bishops independent of the central government, a situation which led to conflict between the Arian king Leovigild and his bishop, Sunna.

The bishopric of Badajoz was erected in 1225, shortly after it was reconquered from the Moors by King Alfonso IX of León. Its first bishop was Don Pedro Pérez, appointed by Alfonso X, the Wise. The diocese was suffragan to the archdiocese of Seville, and was bounded on the north by the diocese of Coria, diocese of Plasencia, and diocese of Toledo, on the east by Toledo, the diocese of Ciudad Real, and the diocese of Córdoba, on the south by the archdiocese of Seville, and on the west by Portugal.

On July 28, 1994, Pope John Paul II established the Archdiocese of Mérida–Badajoz, making the Church of Saint John Baptist its metropolitan cathedral.

== Suffragan dioceses ==
- Coria–Cáceres
- Plasencia

== Ordinaries ==
=== Diocese of Mérida ===
- Martial (fl. c. 252)
- Felix (after 252)
- Liberius (before 300 – after 314)
- Florentius (before c. 347 – c. 357)
- Hydatius (fl. 380)
- Patruinus (fl. 400)
- Gregory (fl. c. 408/409)
- Antoninus (before 445 – after 448)
- Zeno (fl. 483)
- Saint Paul (c. 530 – c. 560)
- Saint Fidelis (c. 560 – c. 571)
- Saint Masona (before 573 – after 606)
- Saint Innocent (fl. 610)
- Saint Renovatus
- Stephen I (fl. 633)
- Orontius (before 638 – after 661)
- Profitius (fl. 666)
- Festus (fl. c. 672)
- Stephen II (antes 681 – after 684)
  - Zeno (before 687 – c. 688)
- Maximus (before 688 – after 693)
- Arnulf (before 839 – after 862)

=== Diocese of Badajoz ===
Erected: 1255

==== Bishops before 1500 ====
- Thedocutus (fl. 904)
- Julius (fl. 932)
- Daniel (fl. 1000)
- Pedro Pérez (1255–1266)
- Lorenzo Suárez (1267–1281)
- Gil Colona (1281–1299)
  - Juan de Badajoz (fl. 1286)
  - Alonso (fl. 1287)
  - Gil Ruíz (1290–1295)
- Bernardo (1300–1306)
  - Pietro, elect
- Simón (1308/9–1324)
- Bernabé (1324–1329)
- Juan de Morales (1329–1335)
- Fernando Ramírez de Ágreda (1335–1340)
  - Vicente Estévanez (1341–1347)
- Juan (1349–1353)
- Alfonso Fernando de Toledo y Vargas (1353–1354)
- Juan García Palomeque (24 October 1354 – 4 March 1373 Appointed, Bishop of Osma)
- Fernando Sánchez (1373–1378)
- Fernando Suárez de Figueroa (1378/1379–1402/1403)
  - Pedro (1390 – after 1409) of the Roman obedience
- Gonzalo de Alba, O.P. (1407–1408)
- Diego de Bedán, O.F.M. (1409–1415)
- Juan Rodríguez Villalón (1415–1418)
- Juan de Morales, O.P. (1418–1443/1444)
- Lorenzo Suárez de Figueroa (1444–1459/1461)
- Pedro Silva y Tenorio, O.P. (19 October 1461 – 20 January 1479)
  - Giovanni d’Aragona (20 January 1479 – 14 May 1479), apostolic administrator
- Gómez Suárez de Figueroa (14 May 1479 – 10 November 1485)
- Pedro Ximénez de Prexamo (18 January 1486 – 23 January 1489)
- Bernardino López de Carvajal y Sande (23 Jan 1489 – 27 Mar 1493 Appointed, Bishop of Cartagena (en España))
- Juan Ruiz de Medina (1493–1495 Appointed Bishop of Cartagena)
- Juan Rodríguez de Fonseca (1495–1499 Appointed Bishop of Córdoba)
- Alfonso Manrique de Lara y Solís (6 Sep 1499 – 18 Aug 1516 Appointed, Bishop of Córdoba)

==== 1500s ====
- Pedro Ruiz de la Mota, O.S.B. (22 Aug 1516 – 4 Jul 1520 Appointed, Bishop of Palencia)
- Bernardo de Mesa, O.P. (20 Feb 1521 – 1524 Died)
- Pedro Gómez Sarmiento de Villandrando (26 Oct 1524 – 3 Jul 1525 Appointed, Bishop of Palencia)
- Pedro González Manso (3 Jul 1525 – 13 Mar 1532 Appointed, Bishop of Osma)
- Jerónimo Suárez Maldonado (20 Mar 1532 – 18 Sep 1545 Died)
- Francisco de Navarra y Hualde (14 Dec 1545 – 4 May 1556 Appointed, Archbishop of Valencia)
- Cristóbal Rojas Sandoval (4 May 1556 – 27 May 1562 Appointed, Bishop of Córdoba)
- St. Juan de Ribera (27 May 1562 – 3 Dec 1568 Appointed, Archbishop of Valencia)
- Diego de Simancas (3 Dec 1568 – 13 Jun 1578 Appointed, Bishop of Zamora)
- Diego Gómez de Lamadrid, O.SS.T. (13 Jun 1578 – 15 Aug 1601 Died)

==== 1600s ====
- Andrés Fernández de Córdoba y Carvajal (7 Oct 1602 – 1611 Died)
- Juan Beltrán Guevara y Figueroa (28 Nov 1611 – 12 Jan 1615 Appointed, Archbishop of Santiago de Compostela)
- Cristóbal de Lobera y Torres (16 Nov 1615 – 9 Jul 1618 Appointed, Bishop of Osma)
- Pedro Fernández Zorrilla (23 Jul 1618 – 14 Jun 1627 Confirmed, Bishop of Pamplona)
- Juan Roco Campofrío, O.S.B. (5 Jul 1627 – 8 Mar 1632 Appointed, Bishop of Coria
- Gabriel Ortiz Sotomayor (3 Dec 1635 – 17 Apr 1640 Died)
- José Valle de la Cerda, O.S.B. (17 Dec 1640 – 22 Oct 1644 Died)
- Angel Manrique, O. Cist. (12 Jun 1645 – 28 Feb 1649 Died)
- Diego López de la Vega (23 Aug 1649 – 28 Jan 1658 Appointed, Bishop of Coria)
- Diego del Castillo y Arteaga (25 Feb 1658 – 21 Sep 1658 Died)
- Gabriel de Esparza Pérez (27 Jan 1659 – 13 Mar 1662 Appointed, Bishop of Salamanca)
- Jerónimo Rodríguez de Valderas, O. de M. (17 Apr 1662 – 9 Apr 1668 Appointed, Bishop of Jaén)
- Francisco de Rois y Mendoza, O. Cist. (14 May 1668 – 29 May 1673 Appointed, Archbishop of Granada)
- Francisco Lara (archbishop) (26 Jun 1673 – 1 Mar 1675 Appointed, Archbishop of Zaragoza)
- Agustín Antolínez (bishop), O.S.A. (6 Dec 1675 – 17 Jul 1677 Died)
- Juan Herrero Jaraba (8 Nov 1677 – 17 Mar 1681 Appointed, Bishop of Plasencia)
- Juan Marín y Rodezno (28 Apr 1681 – 12 Jan 1706 Died)

==== 1700s ====
- Alfonso Rozado (19 Jul 1706 – 21 Dec 1706 Died)
- Francisco Valero y Losa (7 Nov 1707 – 18 Mar 1715 Confirmed, Archbishop of Toledo)
- Pedro Francisco Levanto Vivaldo (8 Jul 1715 – 2 Feb 1729 Died)
- Amador Merino y Malaguillas (8 Feb 1730 – 29 Jan 1755 Died)
- Manuel Pérez Minayo y Zumeda (21 Jul 1755 – 28 Nov 1779 Died)
- Santiago Palmero Escada (11 Dec 1780 – 10 Dec 1781 Died)
- Alonso de Solís Marroquín y Gragera, O.S. (17 Feb 1783 – 8 Feb 1797 Died)
- Gabriel Álvarez de Faria y Sánchez Zarzosa (18 Dec 1797 – 11 Apr 1802 Died)

==== 1800s ====
- Mateo Delgado y Moreno (9 Aug 1802 – 16 Feb 1841 Died)
- Francisco Javier Rodríguez y Obregón (17 Dec 1847 – 4 Jan 1853 Died)
- Manuel Garcia Gil, O.P. (22 Dec 1853 – 23 Dec 1858 Appointed, Archbishop of Zaragoza)
- Diego Mariano Alguacil y Rodríguez (23 Dec 1858 – 23 Dec 1861 Confirmed, Bishop of Vitoria)
- Pantaleón Monserrat y Navarro (7 Apr 1862 – 1 Oct 1863 Appointed, Bishop of Barcelona)
- Joaquín Hernández y Herrero (21 Dec 1863 – 25 Sep 1865 Confirmed, Bishop of Segorbe)
- Fernando Ramírez y Vázquez (25 Sep 1865 – 14 Nov 1890 Died)
- Francisco Sáenz de Urturi y Crespo, O.F.M. (1 Jun 1891 – 21 May 1894 Appointed, Archbishop of Santiago de Cuba)
- Ramón Torrijos y Gómez (21 May 1894 – 16 Jan 1903 Died)

==== 1900s ====
- José Hevía y Campomanes, O.P. (25 Jun 1903 – 2 May 1904 Died)
- Félix Soto y Mancera (14 Nov 1904 – 31 Jan 1910 Died)
- Adolfo Pérez y Muñoz (18 Jul 1913 – 11 Jul 1920 Appointed, Bishop of Córdoba)
- Ramón Pérez y Rodríguez (31 Aug 1920 – 7 Jan 1929 Appointed, Bishop of Spain, Military)
- José Maria Alcaráz y Alenda (13 Mar 1930 – 22 Jul 1971 Died)
- Doroteo Fernández y Fernández (22 Jul 1971 – 15 Jan 1979 Resigned)
- Antonio Montero Moreno (3 May 1980 – 9 Jul 2004 Retired)

=== Archdiocese of Mérida–Badajoz ===
Elevated: 28 July 1994

- Antonio Montero Moreno (3 May 1980 – 9 Jul 2004 retired)
- Santiago García Aracil (9 Jul 2004 – 21 May 2015 retired)
- Celso Morga Iruzubieta (21 May 2015 succeeded – 29 June 2024 retired)
- José Rodríguez Carballo (29 June 2024 succeeded – )

== Auxiliary bishops ==
- Fernando de Vera y Zuñiga (1614–1628).
