= Maximilian of Austria =

Maximilian of Austria may refer to the following members of the Habsburg dynasty:

- Maximilian I, Holy Roman Emperor (1459–1519), who obtained the Burgundian lands by marriage
- Maximilian II, Holy Roman Emperor (1527–1576), king of Bohemia, king of Hungary, and emperor of the Holy Roman Empire
- Maximilian III, Archduke of Austria (1558–1618), fourth son of Emperor Maximilian II and Maria of Spain
- Archduke Maximilian Francis of Austria (1756–1801), Archbishop-Elector of Cologne
- Emperor Maximilian I of Mexico (1832–1867), member of the Imperial House of Habsburg-Lorraine, emperor of Mexico
- Archduke Maximilian Eugen of Austria (1895–1952), son of Archduke Otto Francis of Austria
- Maximilian of Austria (Bishop)
