= Sebastián Pérez =

Sébastien Pérez may refer to:

- Sebastián Pérez (bishop) (died 1593), Spanish Roman Catholic bishop
- Sebastián Pérez (footballer, born 1990) Chilean football goalkeeper
- Sebastián Pérez (footballer, born 1993), Colombian football midfielder
- Sebastián Pérez Bouquet (born 2003), Mexican football midfielder

== See also ==
- Sébastien Pérez (born 1973), French football defender
