= Antonio Manrique =

Most Reverend Antonio Manrique
- Bishop of Calahorra y La Calzada
- Church: Catholic Church
- Diocese: Diocese of Calahorra y La Calzada
- In office: 1587–1589
- Predecessor: Juan Ochoa Salazar
- Successor: Pedro Portocarrero

Orders
- Consecration: November 1587 by Gaspar de Quiroga y Vela

Personal details
- Died: 30 January 1589

Antonio Manrique, O.F.M. (died 1589) was a Roman Catholic prelate who served as Bishop of Calahorra y La Calzada (1587–1589).

== Biography ==
Antonio Manrique was ordained a priest in the Order of Friars Minor. On 7 August 1587, he was appointed during the papacy of Pope Sixtus V as Bishop of Calahorra y La Calzada. In November 1587, he was consecrated bishop by Gaspar de Quiroga y Vela, Archbishop of Toledo, with Sebastián Pérez (bishop), Bishop of Osma, and Diego de la Calzada, Titular Bishop of Salona, serving as co-consecrators. He served as Bishop of Calahorra y La Calzada until his death on 30 January 1589.

== External links and additional sources ==
- Cheney, David M. "Diocese of Calahorra y La Calzada–Logroño". Catholic-Hierarchy.org. (for Chronology of Bishops)^{self-published}
- Chow, Gabriel. "Diocese of Calahorra y La Calzada–Logroño". GCatholic.org. (for Chronology of Bishops)^{self-published}

Catholic Church titles
Preceded by Juan Ochoa Salazar	Bishop of Calahorra y La Calzada; 1587–1589	Succeeded by Pedro Portocarrero
