= Alonso Velázquez =

Roman Catholic prelate

Most Reverend Alonso Velázquez
- Archbishop of Santiago de Compostela
- Church: Catholic Church
- Archdiocese: Archdiocese of Santiago de Compostela
- In office: 1583–1587
- Predecessor: Juan de Liermo Hermosa
- Successor: Juan de Sanclemente Torquemada
- Previous post: Bishop of Osma (1578–1583)

Orders
- Consecration: September 1578 by Gaspar de Quiroga y Vela

Personal details
- Born: 1533 Tudela del Duero
- Died: 14 January 1587 (aged 53–54) Santiago de Compostela, Spain

Alonso Velázquez (1533 – 14 January 1587) was a Roman Catholic prelate who served as Archbishop of Santiago de Compostela (1583–1587) and Bishop of Osma (1578–1583).

== Biography ==
Alonso Velázquez was born in Tudela del Duero, Spain. On 13 June 1578, he was appointed during the papacy of Pope Gregory XIII as Bishop of Osma. In September 1578, he was consecrated bishop by Gaspar de Quiroga y Vela, Archbishop of Toledo. On 9 March 1583, he was appointed during the papacy of Pope Gregory XIII as Archbishop of Santiago de Compostela. He served as Archbishop of Santiago de Compostela until his death on 14 January 1587. While bishop, he was the principal consecrator of Pedro Fernández Temiño, Bishop of Ávila.

== External links and additional sources ==
- Cheney, David M. "Diocese of Osma-Soria". Catholic-Hierarchy.org. (for Chronology of Bishops) ^{[self-published]}
- Chow, Gabriel. "Diocese of Osma-Soria (Italy)". GCatholic.org. (for Chronology of Bishops) ^{[self-published]}
- Cheney, David M. "Archdiocese of Santiago de Compostela". Catholic-Hierarchy.org. (for Chronology of Bishops) ^{[self-published]}
- Chow, Gabriel. "Archdiocese of Santiago de Compostela (Spain)". GCatholic.org. (for Chronology of Bishops) ^{[self-published]}

Catholic Church titles
Preceded by Francisco Tello Sandoval	Bishop of Osma; 1578–1583	Succeeded by Sebastián Pérez (bishop)
Preceded by Juan de Liermo Hermosa	Archbishop of Santiago de Compostela; 1583–1587	Succeeded by Juan de Sanclemente Torquemada
