= Alconaba =

- Municipality
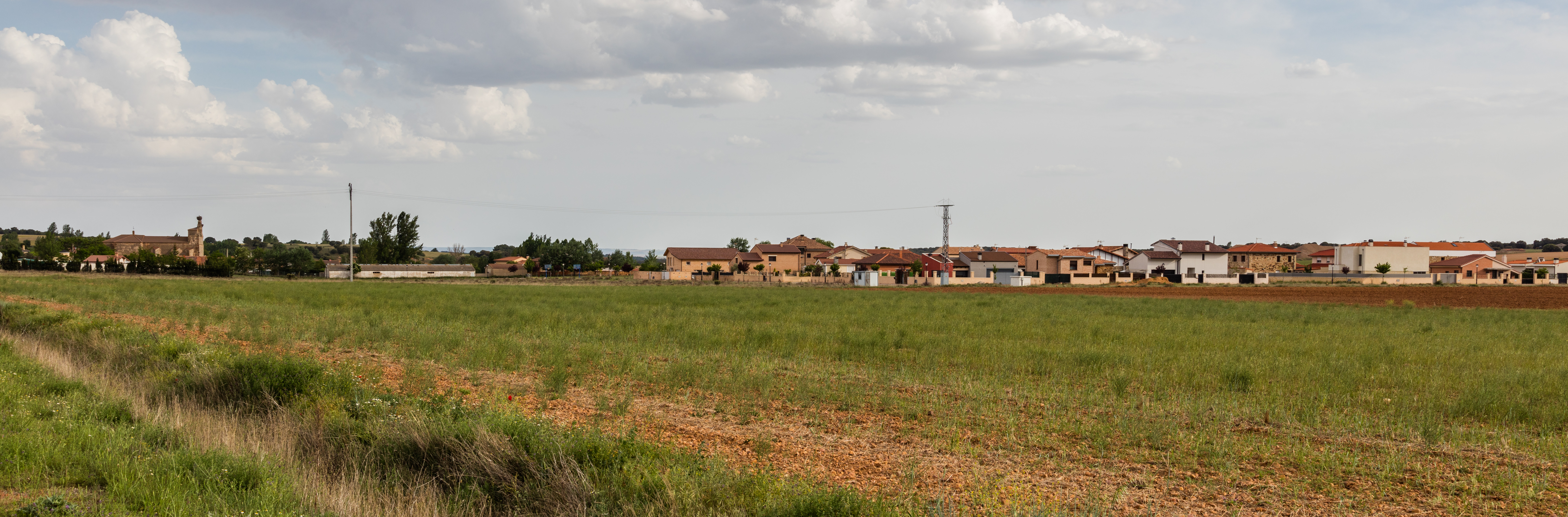

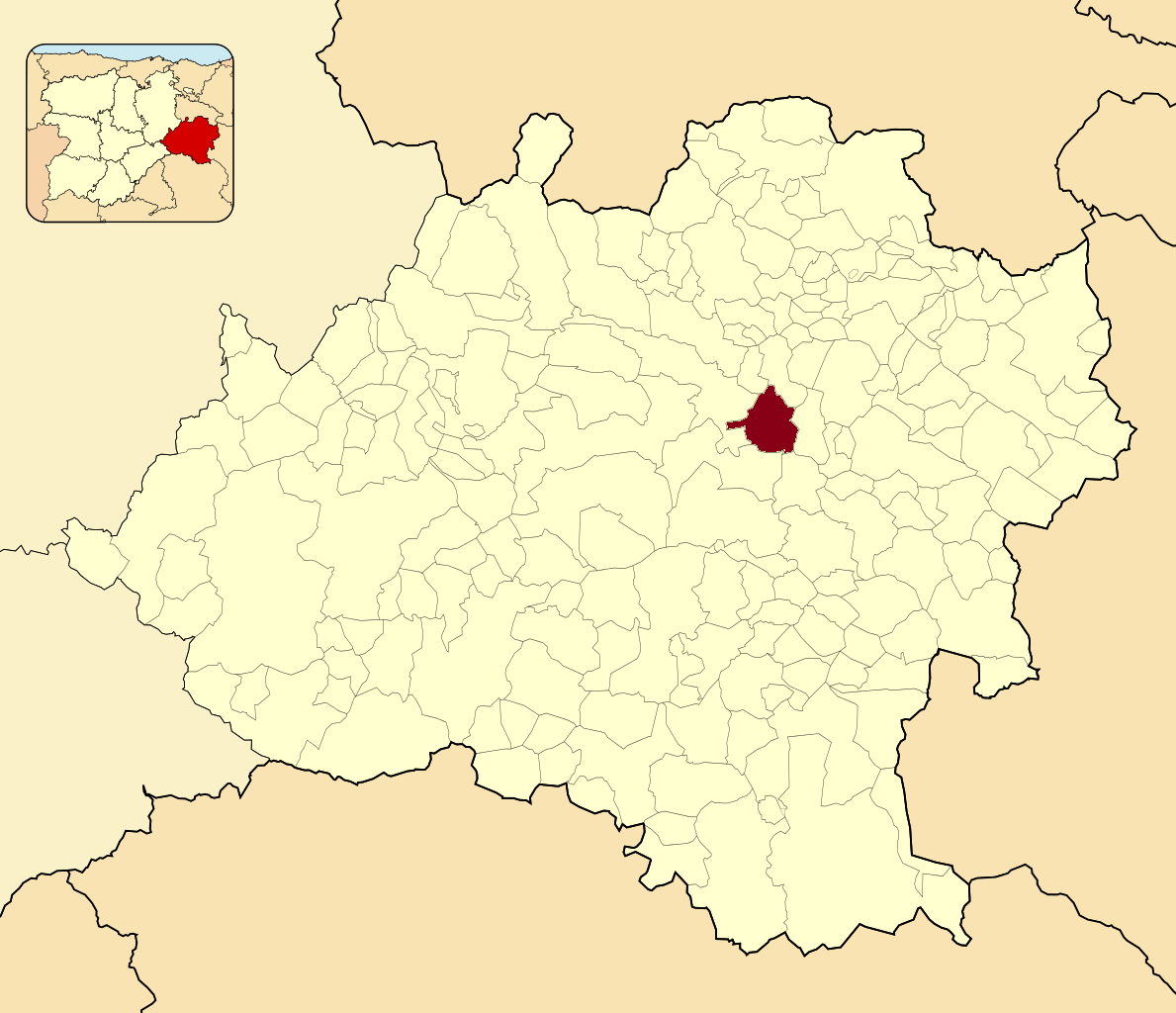
- Municipal location in the Province of Soria.

- Location in Spain. Alconaba (Spain)
- Coordinates: 41°43′25″N 2°23′07″W
- Country: Spain
- Autonomous community: Castile and León
- Province: Soria
- Comarca: Campo de Gomara

Government
  - Alcalde: Pedro Antonio Asensio Blázquez (PP)

Area
  - Total: 52.29 km^{2} (20.19 sq mi)
- Elevation: 1,007 m (3,304 ft)

Population (2025-01-01)
  - Total: 198
  - Density: 3.79/km^{2} (9.81/sq mi)
- Time zone: UTC+1 (CET)
  - Summer (DST): UTC+2 (CEST)
- Website: Official website

Alconaba is a municipality in the Province of Soria, Castilla y León, Spain. It belongs to the Comarca de Campo de Gómara.

In the Catholic hierarchy, Alconaba belongs to the Diocese of Osma-Soria, which is part of the Archdiocese of Burgos.

In addition to Alconaba proper, the municipality includes the villages of Cubo de Hogueras, Martialay and Ontalvilla de Valcorba.

== Toponymy ==
The current name, like many placenames in Spain, is an adaptation of the original Arabic name: al-qunnaba, meaning "hemp".
