= Alonso III Fonseca =

Galician politician and archbishop

His Excellency Alonso de Fonseca y Ulloa
- Archbishop of Toledo; Primate of Spain
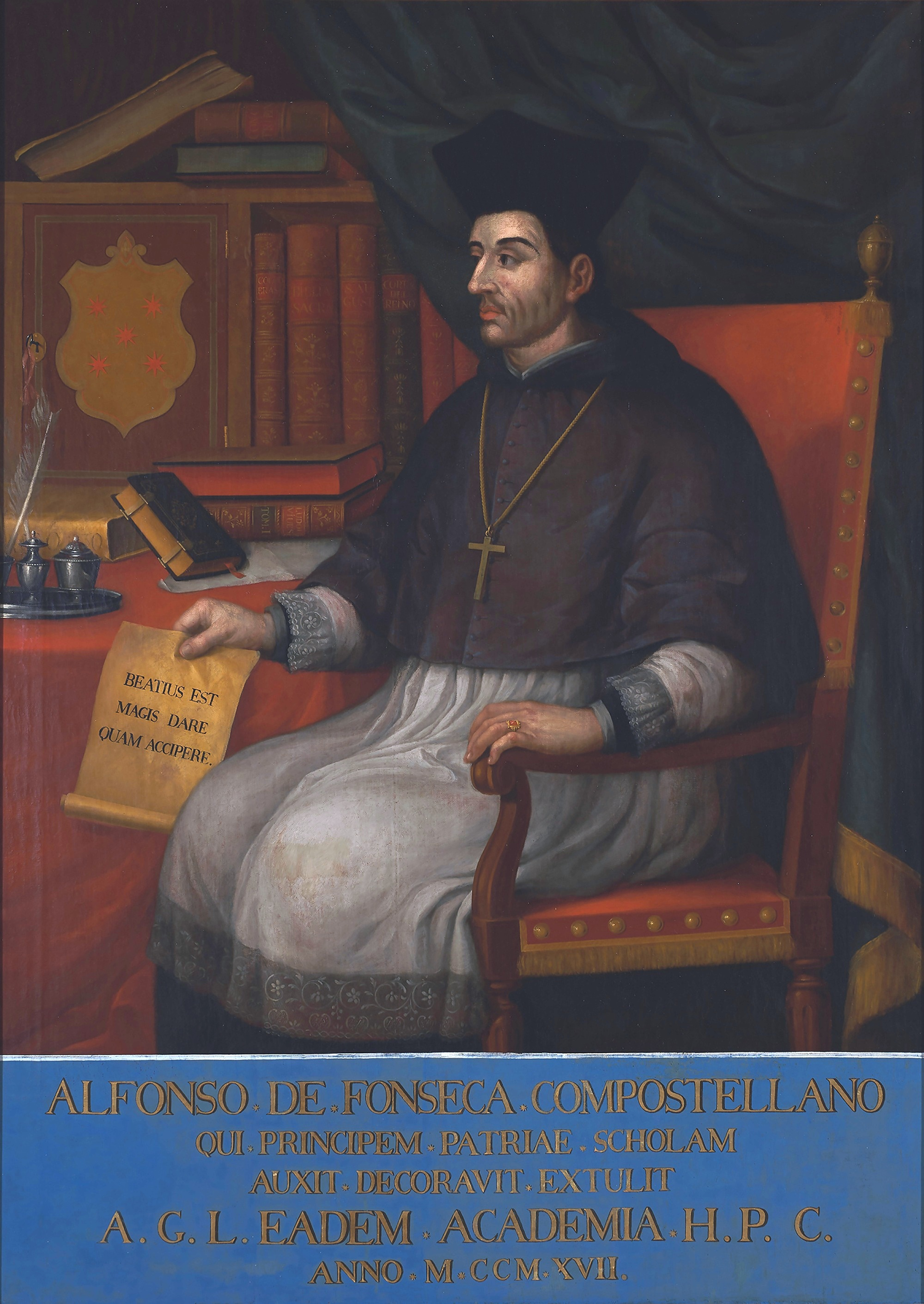
- Portrait by Plácido Fernández Arosa in the University of Santiago de Compostela (1817)
- Church: Roman Catholic
- Archdiocese: Toledo
- Appointed: 31 December 1523
- Term ended: 4 February 1534
- Predecessor: Guillaume de Croÿ
- Successor: Juan Pardo de Tavera
- Previous post: Archbishop of Santiago de Compostela (1507–23)

Personal details
- Born: c. 1475 Santiago de Compostela
- Died: 4 February 1534 (aged c. 59) Alcalá de Henares

Alonso III Fonseca (c. 1475 – 4 February 1534) was a Galician archbishop and politician. He was Archbishop of Santiago de Compostela from 1507, and Archbishop of Toledo from 1523. He was a major supporter of the University of Santiago de Compostela.

== Biography ==
=== Early life ===
Fonseca was the son of the archbishop Alonso II Fonseca and Alonso II's concubine María de Ulloa. His older brother was Diego II de Acevedo, first Count of Andrade. They had different surnames because a younger son (i.e. Alonso III Fonseca) would take the surname of his father (“Fonseca”) and the older son would take the name of his grandmother (the mother of his father the archbishop), which was “Acevedo.”

=== Archbishop of Santiago de Compostela ===
As archbishop, he was forced to confront Condado de Altamira, Count of Altamira, because the count was meddling in the affairs of the Tierras de Santiago, and also put a stop to the injustices committed by the governors there, taking advantage of his close relations with the Spanish monarchy as well as the papacy. He was also involved in lawsuits against the Benedictine monks of San Martín Pinario, during a resurgence of this religious order in Galicia.

He presided over his father's funeral in 1512, at which Gonzalo Fernández de Córdoba, known as "The Great Captain", attended, and Fernández de Córdoba symbolically offered his weapons to Saint James the Great (Santiago) at the funeral.

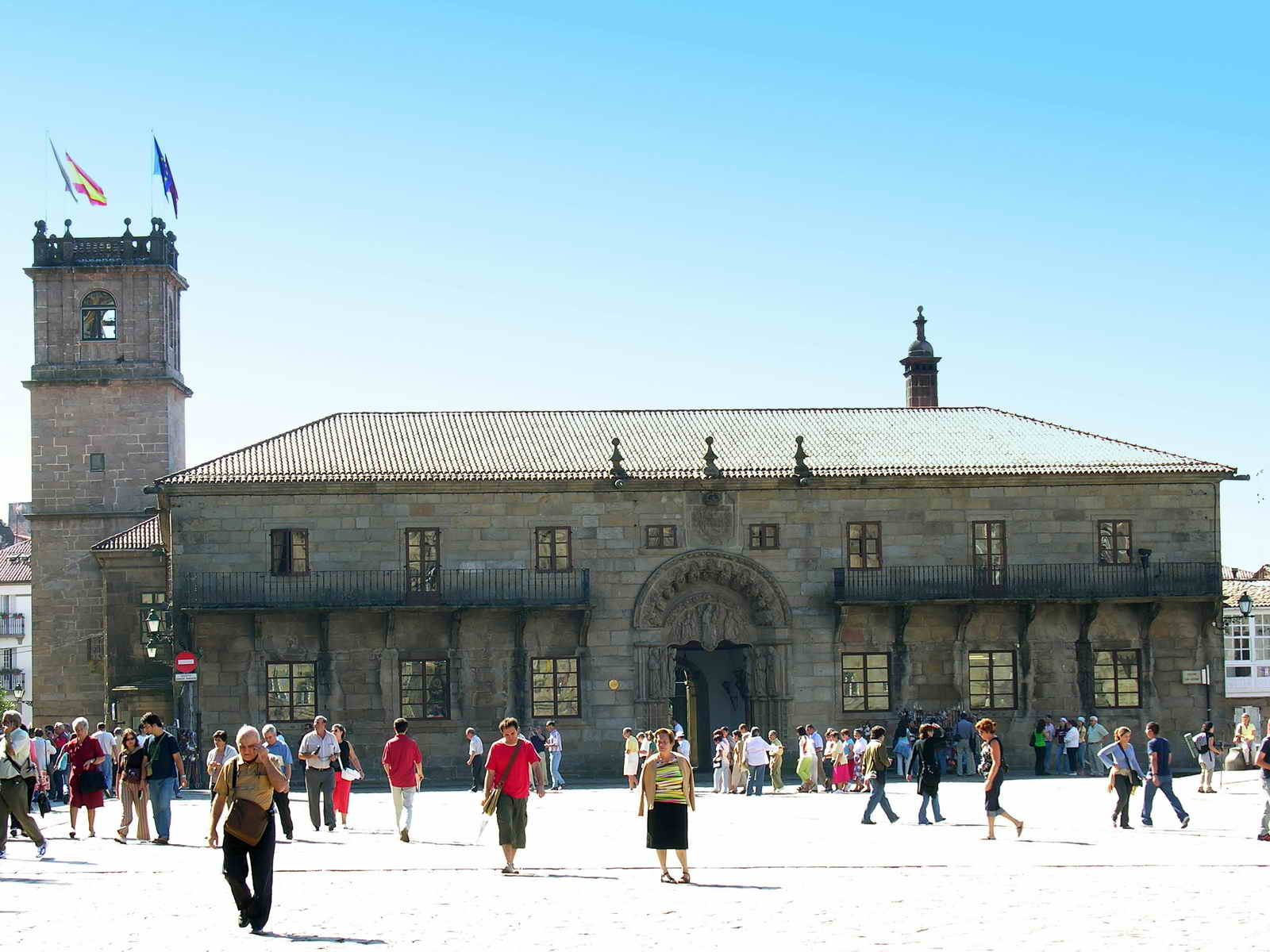
El pazo de Fonseca, Santiago de Compostela.

=== Political career ===
He assumed the leadership of the Galician nobility, who wished to maintain their privileges, and was named by Charles V as a member of the Royal Council. The Galician nobility was not included in the Cortes (Legislature) of Santiago and the Cortes of A Coruña, and Fonseca led the fight for their inclusion in these legislative bodies. Fonseca presided over an assembly at Melide, whose aims for the Kingdom of Galicia included demands for legislative representation and a new board of trade (casa de contratación) based at A Coruña. He also served as a mediator in the War of the Germanías.

=== Archbishop of Toledo ===
In 1523, he was named Archbishop of Toledo, and in this position, served as a patron to scholars, artists, and humanists. He baptized Philip II of Spain in May 1527. His main place of residence was at Alcalá de Henares, where he died on 4 February 1534. He was buried at Salamanca.

He had a son, the result of an affair with the noblewoman Juana de Pimentel. Fonseca's son later served the Spanish king and inherited property in Galicia.

=== Legacy ===
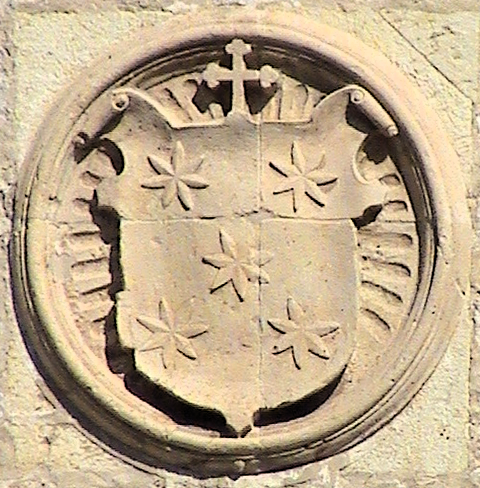
The coat of arms of Archbishop Fonseca.

The definitive consolidation of the University of Santiago de Compostela comes with Fonseca. Fonseca was an extremely erudite man, a Renaissance man and patron of numerous artists of the time, who was in touch with important thinkers such as Erasmus of Rotterdam. Around 1507 the old Pilgrim's Hospital in Santiago de Compostela was purchased with the aim of transforming it into a university college. The Santiago Alfeo College, today known as the Fonseca College, was also built, which became the centre of the university life till the second half of the 18th century and still remains emblematic in today's university.

Catholic Church titles
Preceded by Alfonso de Fonseca y Ulloa	Archbishop of Santiago de Compostela; 1507–1523	Succeeded by Juan Pardo de Tavera
Preceded by Guillaume de Croy	Archbishop of Toledo; 1523–1534	Succeeded by Juan Pardo de Tavera
