= Gaspar de Quiroga y Vela =

Catholic official

His Eminence Gaspar de Quiroga y Vela
- Cardinal, Archbishop of Toledo; Primate of Spain
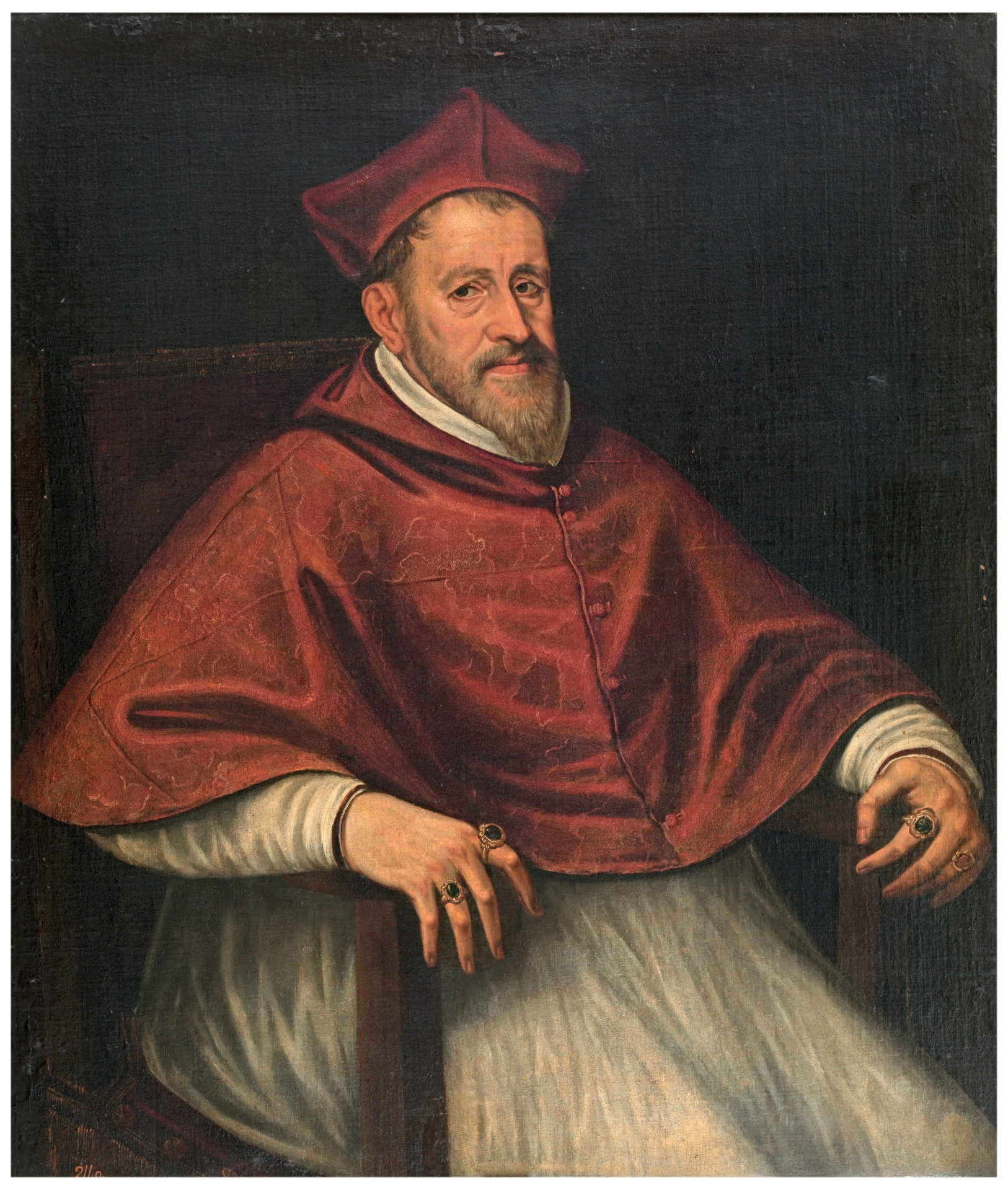
- Gaspar de Quiroga y Vela
- Church: Roman Catholic
- Appointed: 6 September 1577
- Term ended: 12 November 1594
- Predecessor: Bartolomé Carranza
- Successor: Albert of Austria
- Other post: Cardinal-Priest of Santa Balbina (1578–94)
- Previous post: Bishop of Cuenca (1571–77)

Orders
- Consecration: 15 April 1572 by Diego de Espinosa
- Created cardinal: 15 December 1578 by Pope Gregory XIII
- Rank: Cardinal-Priest

Personal details
- Born: 13 January 1512 Madrigal de las Altas Torres, Spain
- Died: 20 November 1594 (aged 82) Madrid, Spain
- Coat of arms

Gaspar de Quiroga y Vela (13 January 1512 – 20 November 1594) was a prominent Spanish churchman who rose to become General Inquisitor of Spain, from 1573 to 1594, and Archbishop of Toledo from 1577 to 1594. He was named a Cardinal by Pope Gregory XIII in 1578. He was the nephew of the 1st Bishop of Michoacán in Mexico, Vasco de Quiroga (died 1565).

== Biography ==
Born in Madrigal de las Altas Torres, he studied at the Colegio de San Salvador de Oviedo of the University of Salamanca, of which he was later a professor, and the Colegio Mayor Santa Cruz in Valladolid. He obtained a licentiate in canon law in 1537 and a doctorate in canon law in 1538. He was named vicar general and a canon of Toledo.

He went to Rome in 1554 as an auditor of the Roman Rota. While in Rome he befriended Ignatius of Loyola, the founder of the Society of Jesus. In 1559, he was sent by King Philip II as an envoy to Naples and to the Spanish-administered territories in the Italian peninsula.

He served as a member of the Spanish High Council of Justice since 1563 and as Bishop of Cuenca, (1561–77), being then promoted to Archbishop of Toledo, to replace Bartolomé de Carranza who had been under arrest in Spain and Rome for the last 17 years, charged with heresy. Quiroga was also active as President of the Council of Italy (1567–71; 1586–94), and became a member of the Spanish Council of State.

He was a patron in Toledo of the Greek-Spanish painter Doménikos Theotokópoulos, usually known as El Greco (1541–1614). It is claimed that Quiroga portrait is found in the face of Saint Augustine in the famous Greco painting The Burial of the Count of Orgaz.

Quiroga liberated from the Inquisition's prisons the mystical poet Fray Luis de León (1527–91), who had been imprisoned for over 4 years at Valladolid, from March 1572 until December 1576, for publishing, amongst other things, a Spanish translation of the Song of Solomon, both of his parents having Jewish ancestry albeit being himself an Augustinian friar expert in Greek, Latin and Hebrew.

Around 1584, Quiroga built at the other side of the River Tagus, in the area known as the "Cigarrales", a summer house now occupied by a hotel.

== Episcopal succession ==
Episcopal succession of Gaspar de Quiroga y Vela

While bishop, he was the principal consecrator of:

- Rodrigo de Castro Osorio (de Lemos), Bishop of Oviedo (1574);
- Alonso Velázquez, Bishop of Osma (1578);
- Alfonso Delgado, Bishop of Astorga (1580);
- Andrés Cabrera Bobadilla, Bishop of Segovia (1583);
- Diego Aponte Quiñones, Bishop of Oviedo (1585);
- Fernando Suárez de Figueroa, Bishop of Islas Canarias (1587);
- Antonio Manrique, Bishop of Calahorra y La Calzada (1587);
- Antonio Zapata y Cisneros, Bishop of Cádiz (1587);
- Pedro Portocarrero (bishop, died 1600), Bishop of Calahorra y La Calzada (1589);
- Juan de Zuazola, Bishop of Astorga (1589);
- Juan Bautista Pérez Rubert, Bishop of Segorbe (1592); and
- António de Matos de Noronha, Bishop of Elvas (1592).

== See also ==
- Spanish Inquisition

Catholic Church titles
Preceded by Bernardo de Fresneda	Bishop of Cuenca; 1561–1577	Succeeded by Diego de Covarrubias y Leyva
Preceded by Bartolomé Carranza	Archbishop of Toledo; 1577–1594	Succeeded by Albert VII of Austria
Preceded by Pedro Ponce de León	Grand Inquisitor of Spain; 1573–1594	Succeeded by Jerónimo Manrique de Lara
Preceded by Gaspar Cervantes de Gaeta	Cardinal-Priest of S. Balbina; 1578–1594	Succeeded by Pompeo Arrigoni
Records
Preceded by Gian Girolamo Albani	Oldest living Member of the Sacred College; 15 April 1591 - 12 November 1594	Succeeded by Gabriele Paleotti
