= Juan Beltrán Guevara y Figueroa =

Roman Catholic prelate

Most Reverend Juan Beltrán Guevara y Figueroa
- Archbishop of Santiago de Compostela
- Church: Catholic Church
- Archdiocese: Archdiocese of Santiago de Compostela
- In office: 1615–1622
- Predecessor: Maximilian of Austria
- Successor: Luis Fernández de Córdoba
- Previous posts: Archbishop of Salerno (1606–1611); Archbishop (Personal Title) of Badajoz (1611–1615)

Orders
- Consecration: 8 December 1606 by Ottaviano Paravicini

Personal details
- Born: 1540 Valencia del Ventoso, Spain
- Died: 22 May 1622 (age 83) Santiago de Compostela, Spain

Juan Beltrán Guevara y Figueroa (1540 – 22 May 1622) was a Roman Catholic prelate who served as Archbishop of Santiago de Compostela (1603–1614), Archbishop (Personal Title) of Badajoz (1611–1615), and Archbishop of Salerno (1606–1611).

== Biography ==
Juan Beltrán Guevara y Figueroa was born in Valencia del Ventoso, Spain. On 4 December 1606, he was appointed during the papacy of Pope Paul V as Archbishop of Salerno. On 8 December 1606, he was consecrated bishop by Ottaviano Paravicini, Cardinal-Priest of Sant'Alessio. On 28 November 1611, he was appointed during the papacy of Pope Paul V as Archbishop (Personal Title) of Badajoz. On 12 January 1615, he was appointed during the papacy of Pope Paul V as Archbishop of Santiago de Compostela. He served as Archbishop of Santiago de Compostela until his death on 22 May 1622.

While bishop, he was the principal consecrator of Principal Consecrator of Jerónimo Ruiz Camargo, Bishop of Ciudad Rodrigo (1614), and Francisco González Zárate (de Gamarra), Bishop of Cartagena (1616).

== External links and additional sources ==
- Cheney, David M. "Archdiocese of Salerno-Campagna-Acerno". Catholic-Hierarchy.org. (for Chronology of Bishops) ^{[self-published]}
- Chow, Gabriel. "Metropolitan Archdiocese of Salerno–Campagna–Acerno (Italy)". GCatholic.org. (for Chronology of Bishops) ^{[self-published]}
- Cheney, David M. "Archdiocese of Mérida–Badajoz". Catholic-Hierarchy.org. (for Chronology of Bishops) ^{[self-published]}
- Chow, Gabriel. "Metropolitan Archdiocese of Mérida–Badajoz". GCatholic.org. (for Chronology of Bishops) ^{[self-published]}
- Cheney, David M. "Archdiocese of Santiago de Compostela". Catholic-Hierarchy.org. (for Chronology of Bishops) ^{[self-published]}
- Chow, Gabriel. "Archdiocese of Santiago de Compostela (Spain)". GCatholic.org. (for Chronology of Bishops) ^{[self-published]}

Catholic Church titles
Preceded by Mario Bolognini	Archbishop of Salerno; 1606–1611	Succeeded by Lucio Sanseverino
Preceded by Andrés Fernández de Córdoba y Carvajal	Archbishop (Personal Title) of Badajoz; 1611–1615	Succeeded by Cristóbal de Lobera y Torres
Preceded by Maximilian of Austria	Archbishop of Santiago de Compostela; 1615–1622	Succeeded by Luis Fernández de Córdoba
