= Capillas =

- Municipality
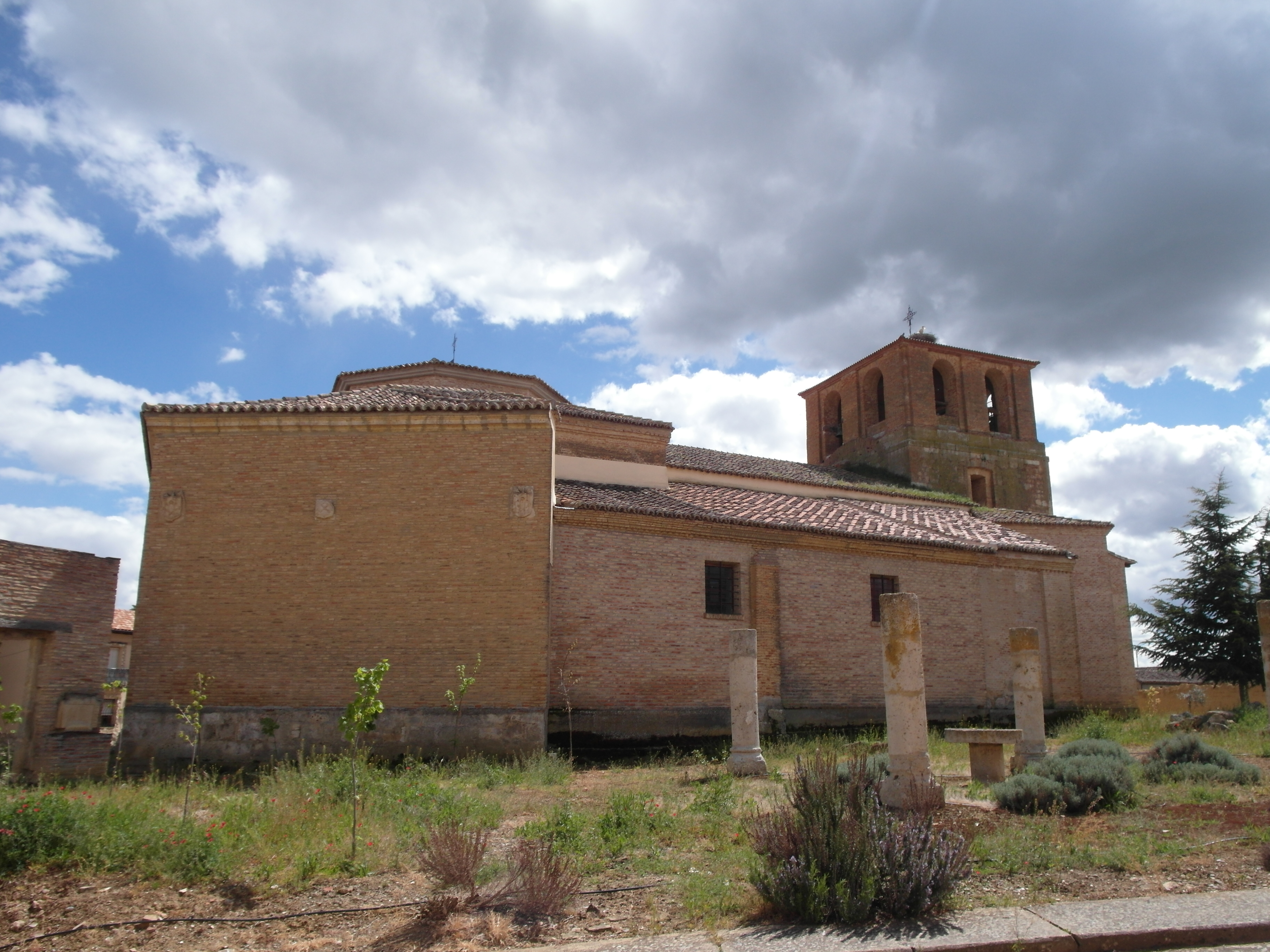
- Church of St. Augustinus

- Location in Castile and León
- Coordinates: 42°0′48″N 4°53′27″W
- Country: Spain
- Community: Castile and León
- Province: Palencia
- Comarca: Tierra de Campos

Government
  - Mayor: Ascensión Curieses Alonso (PSOE, since 2007)

Area
  - Total: 18.27 km^{2} (7.05 sq mi)
- Elevation: 753 m (2,470 ft)

Population (2025-01-01)
  - Total: 68
  - Density: 3.7/km^{2} (9.6/sq mi)
- Demonym(s): Capilludo, capilluda, capilludos, capilludas
- Time zone: UTC+1 (CET)
  - Summer (DST): UTC+2 (CEST)
- Postal code: 34305
- Website: Official website

Capillas is a municipality in Spain, located in the province of Palencia, Castile and León. In 2013, the population was 86.

== History ==
The town was first mentioned in 916 as Fonte de Capela, one of the earliest settlements in the region. The name "Capillas" means "chapels" in Spanish.

== Geography ==
Capillas, part of the comarca of Tierra de Campos, is 30 kilometres (19 mi) from Palencia and 52 kilometres (32 mi)from Valladolid. The municipality borders Boada de Campos, Castil de Vela, Castromocho, Gatón de Campos (in the province of Valladolid), Meneses de Campos and Villarramiel.

== Demographics ==
1900	1910	1920	1930	1940	1950	1960	1970	1981	1991	2004	2013
513	465	386	365	389	375	354	181	162	143	102	86

== Personality ==
Francisco Blanco Salcedo, born here in 1512, was Archbishop of Santiago de Compostela for seven years.
