= Jerónimo Manrique de Lara (bishop of Ávila) =

Grand inquisitor of Spain

Jerónimo Manrique de Lara O. de M.
- Bishop of Cartagena; Bishop of Ávila; General Inquisitor
- Church: Catholic Church
- Diocese: Cartagena (1583–1591); Ávila (1591–1595)
- Predecessor: Gaspar de Quiroga y Vela
- Successor: Pedro de Portocarrero

Personal details
- Born: before 1538
- Died: September 1, 1595
- Denomination: Catholic
- Parents: Alfonso Manrique de Lara
- Occupation: Bishop; General Inquisitor

Jerónimo Manrique de Lara, O. de M. (before 1538 – 1 September 1595) was a church leader in Spain, a General Inquisitor.

== Biography ==
Grandson of famous Rodrigo Manrique, (1406 – Ocaña, 1476), first count of Paredes de Nava, one of the pretenders to be recognized as "Maestre" of the military Order of Santiago, a nephew – grandson also of Bishop and Archbishop Iñigo Manrique de Lara (deceased 1585).

He was an illegitimate child, "barragán" in Spanish for a father being a priest, of Bishop, Archbishop, Cardinal and General Inquisitor Alfonso Manrique de Lara, becoming a Bishop of Cartagena (1583–1591), and later Bishop of Ávila (1591–1595).

There is not much to be said of his time as a General Inquisitor because of his death barely 10 months later.

It is known however that Flemish – German born Johannes Bartholomeus Avontroot (born 1556), resident in the Spanish Canary Islands was some sort of administrator of a sugar manufacturer in Tazacorte and Argual also Flemish, Paulus Vandale. One of Paulus daughters, María Vandale, had been married to a Melchor de Monteverde. She married Avontroot as a widower from Don Melchor but the step children of Avontroot declared to the local inquisitors their new step father ate meat on certain days fast on meat dishes was compulsory for Catholics and suggested laziness about the step father attending Sunday masses. Just before 1595 the Canary Islands Inquisition had already, apparently, a thick dossier on neglectful Avontroot. Whether these documents were sent to the General Inquisitor in Toledo is not known but could be possible.

== External links and additional sources ==
- Cheney, David M. "Diocese of Cartagena". Catholic-Hierarchy.org. (for Chronology of Bishops) ^{[self-published]}
- Chow, Gabriel. "Diocese of Cartagena". GCatholic.org. (for Chronology of Bishops) ^{[self-published]}
- Cheney, David M. "Diocese of Ávila". Catholic-Hierarchy.org. (for Chronology of Bishops) ^{[self-published]}
- Chow, Gabriel. "Diocese of Ávila". GCatholic.org. (for Chronology of Bishops) ^{[self-published]}

Catholic Church titles
Preceded by Gaspar de Quiroga y Vela	Grand Inquisitor of Spain; 1595	Succeeded by Pedro de Portocarrero
