= Caja =

Caja (meaning "box" in Spanish) can refer to:

- Caja or caixa, a Spanish savings bank similar to a credit union
- Caja project, a former Google project for reducing security risks in HTML, CSS and JavaScript
- Caja del Rio, a mesa in New Mexico, USA
- Caja vallenata, a drum similar to a tambora
- Caja China, see Nochebuena
- Caja (file manager), the official file manager for the MATE desktop environment
- Cajá, fruit of the Spondias mombin tree

== People ==
- Isidoro Caja de la Jara (died 1593), Spanish Roman Catholic bishop of Mondoñedo
- Attilio Caja (born 1961), Italian professional basketball coach
- Caja Heimann (1918–1988), Danish film actress
- Jerome Caja (1958–1995), American mixed-media painter and Queercore performance artist

== See also ==
- Caixa
