= Agustin Pérez (bishop) =

Most Reverend Agustin Pérez
- Bishop of Osma
- Church: Catholic Church
- Diocese: Diocese of Osma
- In office: 1261–1286
- Predecessor: Gilles
- Successor: Juan Alvarez (bishop)

Orders
- Consecration: 2 Mar 1262 by Ramon Losaza

Personal details
- Died: 12 April 1286 Osma, Spain

Agustin Pérez (died 1286) was a Roman Catholic prelate who served as Bishop of Osma (1261–1286).

== Biography ==
On 18 Oct 1261, Agustin Pérez was appointed during the papacy of Pope Urban IV as Bishop of Osma. On 2 Mar 1262, he was consecrated bishop by Ramon Losaza, Archbishop of Seville, with Martin, Bishop of Segovia, and Martin Álvarez, Bishop of Segorbe-Albarracin, serving as co-consecrators. He served as Bishop of Osma until his death on 12 Apr 1286.

While bishop, he was the principal consecrator of Alfonso Garcia, Bishop of Palencia (1265) .

== External links and additional sources ==
- Cheney, David M. "Diocese of Osma-Soria". Catholic-Hierarchy.org. (for Chronology of Bishops) ^{[self-published]}
- Chow, Gabriel. "Diocese of Osma-Soria (Italy)". GCatholic.org. (for Chronology of Bishops) ^{[self-published]}

Catholic Church titles
| Preceded by Gilles | Bishop of Osma; 1261–1286 | Succeeded by Juan Alvarez (bishop) |
