= Alonso de Fonseca y Acevedo =

Roman Catholic prelate

Most Reverend Alonso de Fonseca y Acevedo
- Archbishop of Santiago de Compostela
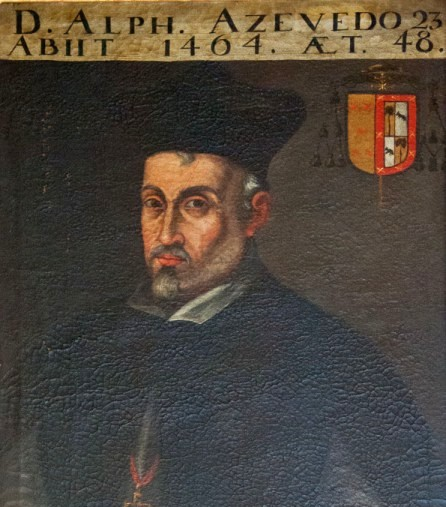
- ALONSO DE FONSECA Y ACEVEDO (1460-1464), o Fonseca el Joven
- Church: Catholic Church
- Archdiocese: Archdiocese of Santiago de Compostela
- In office: 1469–1507
- Predecessor: Alonso de Fonseca y Ulloa
- Successor: Alonso III Fonseca
- Previous posts: Archbishop of Santiago de Compostela (1460–1465); Archbishop of Seville (1465–1469)

Personal details
- Born: 1440 Salamanca
- Died: 12 March 1512 (aged 71–72) Santiago de Compostela, Spain

Alonso de Fonseca y Acevedo (also Alonso II de Fonseca) (1440 – 12 March 1512) was a Roman Catholic prelate who served as Archbishop of Santiago de Compostela (1460–1465 and 1469–1507), and Archbishop of Seville (1465–1469).

== Biography ==
In 1460, Alonso de Fonseca y Acevedo was appointed by the King of Spain and confirmed by Pope Pius II as Archbishop of Santiago de Compostela. In 1465, he was appointed by Pope Paul II as Archbishop of Seville. On 24 May 1493, he was appointed by Pope Alexander VI as Archbishop of Santiago de Compostela from which he resigned in 1507. He was one of the three ambassadors to England that left on 26 August 1501 to accompany princess Catherine of Aragon on her marriage to Arthur, Prince of Wales. The others were Diego Fernández de Córdoba y Mendoza, 3rd Count of Cabra, and Antonio de Rojas Manrique, bishop of Mallorca.

He died in 1512.

== External links and additional sources ==
- Cheney, David M. "Archdiocese of Sevilla {Seville}". Catholic-Hierarchy.org. (for Chronology of Bishops) ^{[self-published]}
- Chow, Gabriel. "Metropolitan Archdiocese of Sevilla (Italy)". GCatholic.org. (for Chronology of Bishops) ^{[self-published]}
- Cheney, David M. "Archdiocese of Santiago de Compostela". Catholic-Hierarchy.org. (for Chronology of Bishops) ^{[self-published]}
- Chow, Gabriel. "Archdiocese of Santiago de Compostela (Spain)". GCatholic.org. (for Chronology of Bishops) ^{[self-published]}

Catholic Church titles
| Preceded by Rodrigo de Luna | Archbishop of Santiago de Compostela (1st time); 1460–1465 | Succeeded by Alonso de Fonseca y Ulloa |
| Preceded by Alonso de Fonseca y Ulloa | Archbishop of Seville; 1465–1469 | Succeeded by Alonso de Fonseca y Ulloa |
| Preceded by Alonso de Fonseca y Ulloa | Archbishop of Santiago de Compostela (2nd time); 1469–1507 | Succeeded by Alonso III Fonseca |
