= Bartolomé Carranza =

16th-century Navarrese priest persecuted in the Spanish Inquisition

His Excellency Bartolomé Carranza O.P.
- Archbishop of Toledo; Primate of Spain
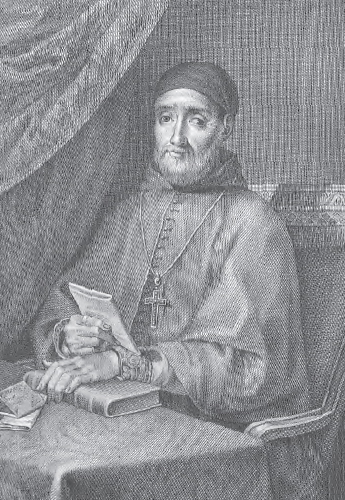
- Church: Catholic Church
- Archdiocese: Toledo
- Appointed: 16 December 1557
- Term ended: 2 May 1576
- Predecessor: Juan Martínez Silíceo
- Successor: Gaspar de Quiroga y Vela

Orders
- Consecration: 27 February 1558 by Antoine Perrenot de Granvelle

Personal details
- Born: 1503 Miranda de Arga, Navarre
- Died: 2 May 1576 (aged 72–73) Santa Maria sopra Minerva, Rome
- Buried: Santa Maria sopra Minerva
- Coat of arms: Bartolomé Carranza's coat of arms

Bartolomé Carranza (1503 – 2 May 1576, sometimes called de Miranda or de Carranza y Miranda) was a Navarrese priest of the Dominican Order, theologian and Archbishop of Toledo. He is notable for having been persecuted by the Spanish Inquisition. He spent much of his later life imprisoned on charges of heresy. He was first denounced in 1530, and imprisoned during 1558–1576. The final judgement found no proof of heresy but secluded him to the Dominican cloister of Santa Maria sopra Minerva where he died seven days later.

== Early life and education ==
Carranza belonged to a noble family which had its estates at Miranda de Arga, Kingdom of Navarre, in present-day Spain. He was born there in 1503, as the youngest son of Pedro Carranza.

As a young man, he bore witness to the Spanish conquest of his home country, Navarre. The ensuing institutional takeover brought about deep changes to church structures of Navarre, such as a redesign of ecclesiastic boundaries and an attempt to prevent European influences from entering Navarre and Spain altogether.

He studied at Alcalá from 1515 to 1520, where Sancho Carranza, his uncle, was professor, entering in 1520 the Dominican order, and then, from 1521 to 1525, at Salamanca and at Valladolid.

He received his early education at Alcalá and in 1520 entered the Dominican convent of Benalaque near Guadalajara.

== Career ==
=== Teacher (1527–1540) ===
At Valladolid he was teacher of theology beginning in 1527. No Spaniard save Melchior Cano rivalled him in learning; students from all parts of Spain flocked to hear him. In 1530 he was denounced to the Inquisition as limiting the papal power and leaning to the opinions of Erasmus, but the process failed; he was made professor of philosophy and regent in theology (1533 to 1539).

He continued his philosophical and theological studies at Salamanca; in 1528 he was made master of the liberal arts, and in 1534 lector of theology, at the College of St. Gregory, Valladolid. On account of some doctrinal opinions he was said to hold, an accusation was about this time brought against him, but nothing further came of it. Carranza's reputation as a learned theologian increased rapidly, and he was appointed censor by the Inquisition and was commissioned to prepare opinions and sermons. He was also sent by his order on various important missions.

In 1539, as representative to the chapter-general of his order he visited Rome; here he was made Master of Theology at the studium generale of the Dominican Order at the Convent of Santa Maria sopra Minerva, the progenitor of the Pontifical University of Saint Thomas Aquinas, Angelicum. While he mixed with the liberal circle associated with Juan de Valdés, he had also the confidence of Pope Paul III.

Thus in 1539 he represented his province at the general chapter of the Dominicans at Rome. After his return, in 1540, the Emperor Charles V offered him the See of Cuzco in Peru, but Carranza declined the appointment and continued performing his duties as lector of theology at Valladolid. He acted as censor (cualificador) of books (including versions of the Bible) for the Inquisition. In 1540 he was nominated to the sees of the Canary Islands and of Cuzco, Peru, but declined both.

=== Council of Trent (1545–1552) ===
In 1545, when the Council of Trent was opened, Charles V sent Carranza and another Dominican, Domingo de Soto, as imperial theologians, to the council, and by June, 1545, Carranza was in Trent. During the first period of the council (1545–47) he took an active part in the discussions of the theologians in the congregations, expressed opinions concerning the various matters appointed for discussion, the sacraments in general, Baptism, the Eucharist, and the Sacrifice of the Mass, and preached at Divine service, 14 March, before the assembled council. He also showed great zeal in the conferences concerning the reform of church discipline.

In the warm discussions as to the duty of episcopal residence, he insisted on the imperative duty of bishops and clergy to reside in their benefices, publishing at Venice (1547) his discourse to the council, De necessaria residentia personali, which he treated as iuris divini. He was strongly of the opinion that the duty of residence was a Divine law (ius divinum), and therefore could not be delegated to a vicar. On this question, Carranza wrote and issued a treatise, Controversia de necessarii residentii personali episcoporum et aliorum inferiorum ecclesiæ pastorum Tridenti explicata. His Lenten sermon to the Council, on justification, caused much remark. He was made provincial general of his order for Castile.

Carranza also had a share in drawing up the eleven articles proposed by the Spaniards, which treated the duty of episcopal residence and other questions of discipline relating to the office of a bishop. When the council was transferred to Bologna he did not go to that city, but remained in Trent.

In 1548 Charles asked him to accompany Prince Philip to Flanders as confessor, but Carranza declined the position; in 1549 he again refused the appointment of Bishop of the Canary Islands.

After his return to Spain, in 1549, he was made prior of the monastery at Palencia, and in 1550 provincial. In 1551, when Pope Julius III reopened the Council at Trent, Carranza went once more to that city to take part in the deliberations. The council was again interrupted in 1552, and Carranza went back to Spain, where, besides his duties in his order, he also took part in the labours of the Inquisition.

=== England (1554–1557) ===
Charles sent him to England in 1554 with his son Philip on the occasion of the marriage with Mary. He became Mary's confessor, and laboured earnestly for the re-establishment of the old religion, especially in Oxford.

As almoner of Prince Philip, Carranza came in contact with the prince, and often preached before him and his court. When, in 1554, Philip was betrothed to Queen Mary of England, and was preparing to go to that country for the marriage, he sent Carranza and other members of Spanish orders ahead of him, in order to give support to the queen in her efforts to bring back the country to the Catholic Faith. Carranza remained until 1557 in England, where he was actively engaged, in connexion with Cardinal Pole, as visitator and preacher. He sought to prevent the sale of Protestant books, preached frequently against what he considered as "the false doctrines", and made an inspection of the University of Oxford, from which, by his efforts, a number of professors were expelled. After Charles V had abdicated the throne and was succeeded, in Spain, by Philip, Carranza returned, in 1557, to the Continent, and went to Flanders, where the new king had his principal residence at that time. In Flanders the zealous Dominican also busied himself with efforts to check the introduction and spread of Protestant writings and to maintain the Catholic Faith.

=== Archbishop of Toledo (1557–1559) ===
The See of Toledo falling vacant by the death of the Cardinal Archbishop Siliceo, 31 May 1557, the king decided upon Carranza as successor to the position. In vain did Carranza exert himself to win the favour of the king for another candidate. Philip II persisted in his choice, so that at last Carranza yielded and was preconized by Pope Paul IV, 16 December 1557, as Archbishop of Toledo and, therefore, Primate of Spain. Carranza received episcopal consecration at Brussels, in 1558, from Cardinal Granvella, then Bishop of Arras. Equipped with important political instructions the new archbishop left Flanders in June and reached the court at Valladolid in August. Soon after this he went to Yuste to visit Charles V, who was dying; he remained with the emperor until the latter's death.

In 1557 Philip appointed him to the archbishopric of Toledo; he accepted with reluctance, and was consecrated at Brussels on 27 February 1558. He was at the deathbed of Charles V (on 21 September) and gave him extreme unction; then raised a curious controversy as to whether Charles, in his last moments, had been influenced by Lutheranism. A report arose in time that Carranza had led Charles into heretical views, so that the emperor had not died in the true Catholic Faith. This rumour was pure invention, but it gave a new ground for the process before the Inquisition which had already begun against him.

It was only for about a year that Carranza was able to devote himself to his diocese, where he bestowed especial attention upon the care of the poor. In 1558, in Antwerp he published Commentary on the Christian Catechism. A number of views suspected of heresy were found in the book, and the Grand Inquisitor Fernando de Valdés y Salas brought an action against the author. Besides this work on the catechism, Carranza's manuscripts, expressions he had employed in sermons, and letters found in his possession, including one from Juan Valdés, the heretic, were taken as evidence against him. Melchior Cano, the famous theologian, and Dominicus de Soto, both members of the same order as the archbishop, drew numerous propositions from the commentary which were open to ecclesiastical censure. A Brief of Paul IV, dated 7 January 1559, had granted the Grand Inquisitor of Spain the power, for the space of two years, to investigate the conduct of all Spanish bishops; this measure was intended to counteract the threatening danger of the spread of Protestant doctrine. With the permission, therefore, of King Philip II (26 June 1558) the grand inquisitor had the archbishop arrested at Torrelaguna, 22 August 1558, and brought a prisoner to Valladolid.

=== Imprisonment (1559–1567) ===
The same year he was again denounced to the Inquisition on the grounds of his Commentary (although in 1563 it had received the approval of the Commission of the Council of Trent). He had evidently lost favour with Philip, by whose order he was arrested at Torrelaguna in 1559 and imprisoned for nearly eight years, and the book was placed on the Index. The process dragged on. Carranza appealed to Rome, was taken there in December 1566, and confined for ten years in the castle of St. Angelo. He was defended in the proceedings by Navarrese fellows Francisco de Navarra, archbishop of Valencia (a close friend of his) and Martin de Azpilcueta, from Barasoain.

Pope Pius IV made repeated requests to Philip II in the matter, and was urged several times in 1562 and 1563 by the members of the Council of Trent to bring the case of the Archbishop of Toledo before his court. The Congregation of the Index also gave at the council a favourable testimony for Carranza in regard to his commentary. Nevertheless, the Spanish process pursued its tedious course. In 1564, when the Inquisition had closed its investigation, the king expressed the wish to Pius IV that the matter be decided in Spain by judges appointed by the pope. The pope agreed to this and named (13 July 1565) four judges who were to pronounce judgment in Spain. These judges were: Cardinal Ugo Buoncompagni, Ippolito Aldobrandini, Fel. Peretti, O. S. F., and J. B. Castagna, Archbishop of Rossano; all four became popes later. However, after their arrival in Spain in November, 1565, they were not permitted to proceed independently of the officials of the Inquisition, and the process, therefore, reached no final settlement. At last, in 1567, owing to the peremptory order of Pius V, the suit was brought before the Curia, the official documents were sent to Rome, and Carranza, who had been in prison eight years, was taken to Rome, where he arrived 28 May 1567.

=== Trial in Rome (1567–1576) and death ===
The papal chambers in the Castle of Sant'Angelo were appointed to be his residence during the trial. Once more the case lasted a long time, being nine years before the Curia. It was not until the reign of Gregory XIII that a final decision was reached, 14 April 1576.

Carranza was not found guilty of actual heresy, but he was condemned to abjure sixteen Lutheran propositions of which he had made himself suspected, was forbidden to enter on the government of his diocese for another five years, and was ordered during this period to live in the monastery of his order near the church of Santa Maria sopra Minerva, there to perform certain religious exercises as penance. Carranza died, however, in the same year, and was buried in the choir of the church just mentioned. Before this he had, on 23 April, visited the seven great churches and had celebrated Mass on the following day in the Archbasilica of Saint John Lateran. He was succeeded in his see by the inquisitor general, Gaspar Quiroga.

The theologian José Tellechea Idígoras (Melanchton y Carranza: préstamos y afinidades, Salamanca, Universidad Pontificia, Centro de Estudios Orientales y Ecuménicos Juan XXIII, 1979) concluded that while Carranza may have been unconscious of his "errors", there is no doubt that he was influenced by the doctrine of the Lutheran Philip Melanchthon.

At a later date the Congregation of the Index also condemned his Commentary. This work, a stout folio, treated the doctrines of Christian faith and morals under four heads: faith, commandments, sacraments, and good works.

Previous to receiving the last sacraments he declared that he had been all his life a true adherent of the Catholic Faith, that he had never voluntarily understood and held the condemned propositions in a heretical sense, and that he submitted entirely to the judgment pronounced upon him. He had borne the imprisonment of nearly seventeen years with patience and resignation.

== Legacy ==
According to J. P. Kirsch:

Carranza's sorrowful fate was brought about, largely, by the intense desire to keep all Protestant influences out of Spain. At the same time it cannot be denied that expressions which he used and propositions which he occasionally set forth would of themselves give rise to the suggestion of heretical opinions.

He was universally venerated at Rome. The Spanish people honoured him as a saint; Pope Gregory XIII placed a laudatory inscription on his tomb in the church of Santa Maria and gave permission for the placing over his grave of a monument bearing an inscription in his honour.

Besides the Commentary, Carranza published a Summa Conciliorum et Pontificum a Petro usque Paulum III (Venice, 1546), which has often been re-published and enlarged by later editors. The Summa was prefaced by four dissertations:

1. Quanta sit auctoritas traditionum in ecclesiâ
2. Quanta Sacræ Scripturæ
3. Quanta Romani Pontificis et Sedis apostolicæ
4. Quanta Conciliorum

Further, there is his controversial treatise concerning episcopal residence mentioned above, and an Introduction to the Hearing of the Mass. An edition of the latter was issued in Antwerp in 1555.
