= Miranda de Arga =

Town in Navarra, Spain

Coordinates: 42°29′N 1°50′W

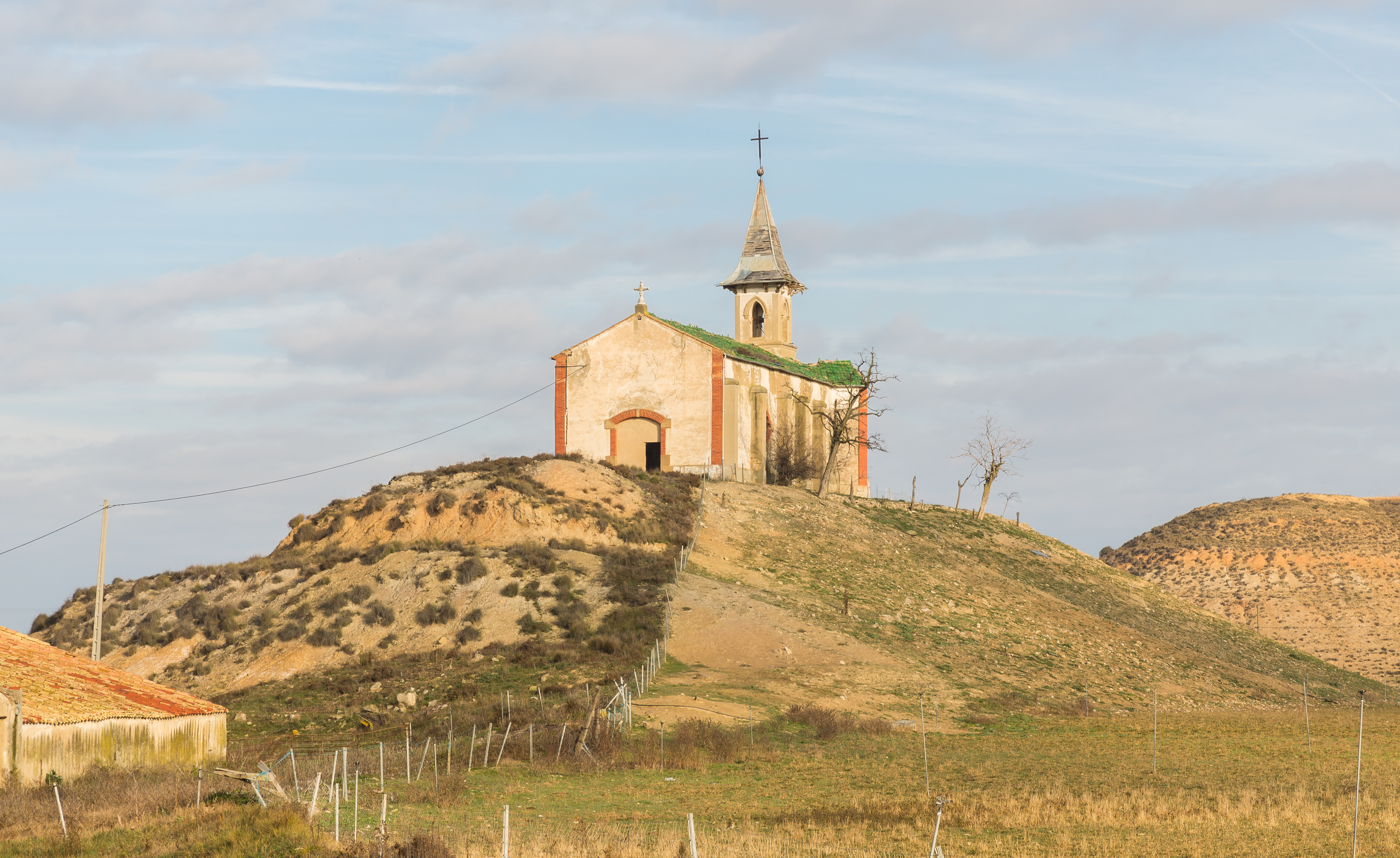
Vergalijo

Miranda de Arga (Basque: Miranda Arga) is a town and municipality located in the province and autonomous community of Navarre, northern Spain.

The prominent 16th-century theologian Bartolomé Carranza was born in 1503 at Miranda de Arga, member of a noble family which had its estates there.
