= Cristóbal Fernández Valtodano =

Roman Catholic prelate (??–1572)

Most Reverend Cristóbal Fernández Valtodano
- Archbishop of Santiago de Compostela
- Church: Catholic Church
- Archdiocese: Archdiocese of Santiago de Compostela
- In office: 1570–1572
- Predecessor: Gaspar de Zúñiga y Avellaneda
- Successor: Francisco Blanco Salcedo

Personal details
- Died: 14 November 1572 Santiago de Compostela, Spain

Cristóbal Fernández Valtodano (died 14 November 1572) was a Roman Catholic prelate who served as Archbishop of Santiago de Compostela (1570–1572) and Bishop of Palencia (1561–1570).

== Biography ==
On 2 June 1561, Cristóbal Fernández Valtodano was appointed during the papacy of Pope Pius IV as Bishop of Palencia. On 20 February 1570, he was appointed during the papacy of Pope Pius V as Archbishop of Santiago de Compostela. He served as Archbishop of Santiago de Compostela until his death on 14 November 1572.

== External links and additional sources ==
- Cheney, David M. "Diocese of Palencia". Catholic-Hierarchy.org. (for Chronology of Bishops) ^{[self-published]}
- Chow, Gabriel. "Diocese of Palencia (Spain)". GCatholic.org. (for Chronology of Bishops) ^{[self-published]}
- Cheney, David M. "Archdiocese of Santiago de Compostela". Catholic-Hierarchy.org. (for Chronology of Bishops) ^{[self-published]}
- Chow, Gabriel. "Archdiocese of Santiago de Compostela (Spain)". GCatholic.org. (for Chronology of Bishops) ^{[self-published]}

Catholic Church titles
Preceded by Pedro de la Gasca	Bishop of Palencia; 1561–1570	Succeeded by Juan Ramírez Zapata de Cárdenas
Preceded by Gaspar de Zúñiga y Avellaneda	Archbishop of Santiago de Compostela; 1570–1572	Succeeded by Francisco Blanco Salcedo
