= Francisco Blanco Salcedo =

Spanish Catholic archbishop (1512–1581)

Most Reverend Francisco Blanco Salcedo
- Archbishop of Santiago de Compostela
- Church: Catholic Church
- Archdiocese: Archdiocese of Santiago de Compostela
- In office: 1574–1581
- Predecessor: Cristóbal Fernández Valtodano
- Successor: Juan de Liermo Hermosa
- Previous posts: Bishop of Ourense (1556–1565); Bishop of Málaga (1565–1574)

Orders
- Consecration: 23 August 1556 by Pedro de la Gasca

Personal details
- Born: 1 January 1512 Capillas, Spain
- Died: 26 April 1581 (age 69) Santiago de Compostela, Spain

Francisco Blanco Salcedo (1 January 1512 – 26 April 1581) was a Spanish Roman Catholic prelate who served as Archbishop of Santiago de Compostela (1574–1581), Bishop of Málaga (1565–1574), and Bishop of Ourense (1556–1565).

== Biography ==
Francisco Blanco Salcedo was born in Capillas, Spain. On 12 June 1556, he was appointed during the papacy of Pope Paul IV as Bishop of Ourense. On 23 August 1556, he was consecrated bishop by Pedro de la Gasca, Bishop of Palencia. On 13 April 1565, he was appointed during the papacy of Pope Pius IV as Bishop of Málaga. On 4 June 1574, he was appointed during the papacy of Pope Gregory XIII as Archbishop of Santiago de Compostela. He served as Archbishop of Santiago de Compostela until his death on 26 April 1581. While bishop, he was the principal consecrator of Juan de Sanclemente Torquemada, Bishop of Ourense (1579).

== See also ==
- Catholic Church in Spain

== External links and additional sources ==
- Cheney, David M. "Diocese of Orense". Catholic-Hierarchy.org. (for Chronology of Bishops) ^{[self-published]}
- Chow, Gabriel. "Diocese of Orense (Spain)". GCatholic.org. (for Chronology of Bishops) ^{[self-published]}
- Cheney, David M. "Diocese of Málaga". Catholic-Hierarchy.org. (for Chronology of Bishops) ^{[self-published]}
- Chow, Gabriel. "Diocese of Málaga (Spain)". GCatholic.org. (for Chronology of Bishops) ^{[self-published]}
- Cheney, David M. "Archdiocese of Santiago de Compostela". Catholic-Hierarchy.org. (for Chronology of Bishops) ^{[self-published]}
- Chow, Gabriel. "Archdiocese of Santiago de Compostela (Spain)". GCatholic.org. (for Chronology of Bishops) ^{[self-published]}

Catholic Church titles
Preceded by Francisco Manrique de Lara	Bishop of Ourense; 1556–1565	Succeeded by Fernando Tricio Arenzana
Preceded by Bernardo Manrique	Bishop of Málaga; 1565–1574	Succeeded by Francisco Pacheco de Córdoba
Preceded by Cristóbal Fernández Valtodano	Archbishop of Santiago de Compostela; 1574–1581	Succeeded by Juan de Liermo Hermosa
