= Pedro Helías =

Pedro Helías (or Elías; died 1149) was the Archbishop of Santiago de Compostela from 1143 until his death. Prior to becoming archbishop he was a canon of the cathedral of Saint James from 1102, serving as its dean in 1122–24.

Pedro and his relative Bernardo—a fellow canon, engineer, archivist and royal chancellor—were both protégés of Archbishop Diego Gelmírez, but later they fell out with him. In 1116–17 they jointed the municipal revolt of Compostela against the policies of the archbishop. During the unrest, the archbishop's brother, Gudesindo, was killed.

After Diego's death in 1140, Pedro was the candidate favoured by the chapter and the city, but King Alfonso VII tried to force the election of Berengar, former bishop of Salamanca. The royal choice was resisted. Pedro went to Rome, where he received confirmation from Pope Innocent II in 1141. It was not until 1143, however, that Pedro was recognised by the king.

== See also ==
- Catholic Church in Spain

== Sources ==
- Fletcher, Richard (1978). The Episcopate in the Kingdom of León in the Twelfth Century. Oxford: Oxford University Press.
- Reilly, Bernard F. (1998). The Kingdom of León-Castilla Under King Alfonso VII, 1126–1157. Philadelphia: University of Pennsylvania Press.
