= Caixa =

Caixa (box – sometimes bank – in the Portuguese, Galician, and Catalan languages ['kajʃɐ]) may refer to:

- a Brazilian snare drum
- A Caixa, a 1994 Portuguese comedy film directed by Manoel de Oliveira
- Caixa Econômica Federal, also referred to as Caixa, a Brazilian bank
- Caixa Geral de Depósitos, also referred to as Caixa, the second largest bank in Portugal
- Caixa (São Vicente), a mountain on the island of São Vicente, Cape Verde
- La Caixa, a Spanish banking institution
- La Caixa, Barcelona, headquarters and skyscrapers of La Caixa bank

== See also ==
- Caixas, a commune in the Pyrénées-Orientales department in southern France
- Banco Nossa Caixa, also referred to as Nossa Caixa, a defunct Brazilian bank
- Caja, the Spanish-language equivalent word
