= Pedro Portocarrero (bishop, died 1600) =

Grand Inquisitor of Spain

Most Reverend Pedro Portocarrero
- Bishop of Cuenca
- Church: Catholic Church
- Diocese: Roman Catholic Diocese of Cuenca
- In office: 1597–1600
- Predecessor: Juan Fernández Vadillo
- Successor: Andrés Pacheco
- Previous posts: Bishop of Calahorra y La Calzada (1589–1594); Bishop of Córdoba (1594–1597)

Orders
- Consecration: 4 June 1589 by Gaspar de Quiroga y Vela

Personal details
- Born: Spain
- Died: 20 September 1600 Cuenca, Spain

Pedro Portocarrero (died 1600) was a Roman Catholic prelate who served as Bishop of Cuenca (1597–1600), Bishop of Córdoba (1594–1597), and Bishop of Calahorra y La Calzada (1589–1594).

== Biography ==
Pedro Portocarrero was born in Spain. On 20 March 1589, he was appointed during the papacy of Pope Sixtus V as Bishop of Calahorra y La Calzada. On 4 June 1589, he was consecrated bishop by Gaspar de Quiroga y Vela, Archbishop of Toledo, with Sebastián Pérez (bishop), Bishop of Osma, and Diego de la Calzada, Titular Bishop of Salona, serving as co-consecrators. On 12 January 1594, he was appointed during the papacy of Pope Clement VIII as Bishop of Córdoba. On 28 May 1597, he was appointed during the papacy of Pope Clement VIII as Bishop of Cuenca. He served as Bishop of Cuenca until his death on 20 September 1600.

While bishop, he was the principal consecrator of Pedro Manso Zuñiga, Bishop of Calahorra y La Calzada (1594); and Francisco Reinoso Baeza, Bishop of Córdoba (1597).

== See also ==
- Grand Inquisitor

== External links and additional sources ==
- Cheney, David M. "Diocese of Calahorra y La Calzada–Logroño". Catholic-Hierarchy.org. (for Chronology of Bishops)^{self-published}
- Chow, Gabriel. "Diocese of Calahorra y La Calzada–Logroño". GCatholic.org. (for Chronology of Bishops)^{self-published}
- Cheney, David M. "Diocese of Córdoba". Catholic-Hierarchy.org. (for Chronology of Bishops) ^{[self-published]}
- Chow, Gabriel. "Diocese of Córdoba". GCatholic.org. (for Chronology of Bishops) ^{[self-published]}
- Cheney, David M. "Diocese of Cuenca". Catholic-Hierarchy.org. (for Chronology of Bishops) ^{[self-published]}
- Chow, Gabriel. "Diocese of Cuenca (Spain)". GCatholic.org. (for Chronology of Bishops) ^{[self-published]}

Catholic Church titles
Preceded by Antonio Manrique	Bishop of Calahorra y La Calzada; 1589–1594	Succeeded by Pedro Manso Zuñiga
Preceded by Fernando de la Vega Fonseca	Bishop of Córdoba; 1594–1597	Succeeded by Francisco Reinoso Baeza
Preceded by Juan Fernández Vadillo	Bishop of Cuenca; 1597–1600	Succeeded by Andrés Pacheco
