= Juan de Liermo Hermosa =

Roman Catholic prelate

Most Reverend Juan de Liermo Hermosa
- Archbishop of Santiago de Compostela
- Church: Catholic Church
- Archdiocese: Archdiocese of Santiago de Compostela
- In office: 1582
- Predecessor: Francisco Blanco Salcedo
- Successor: Alonso Velázquez
- Previous post: Bishop of Mondoñedo (1574–1582)

Personal details
- Born: 1522 San Martín de Liermo, Spain
- Died: 26 July 1582 (age 60) Santiago de Compostela, Spain

Juan de Liermo Hermosa (1522 – 26 July 1582) was a Roman Catholic prelate who served as Archbishop of Santiago de Compostela (1582) and Bishop of Mondoñedo (1574–1582).

== Biography ==
Juan de Liermo Hermosa was born in San Martín de Liermo, Spain. On 4 June 1574, he was appointed during the papacy of Pope Gregory XIII as Bishop of Mondoñedo. On 8 January 1582, he was appointed during the papacy of Pope Gregory XIII as Archbishop of Santiago de Compostela. He served as Archbishop of Santiago de Compostela until his death on 26 July 1582.

== External links and additional sources ==
- Cheney, David M. "Diocese of Mondoñedo–Ferrol". Catholic-Hierarchy.org. (for Chronology of Bishops) ^{[self-published]}
- Chow, Gabriel. "Diocese of Mondoñedo–Ferrol (Spain)". GCatholic.org. (for Chronology of Bishops) ^{[self-published]}
- Cheney, David M. "Archdiocese of Santiago de Compostela". Catholic-Hierarchy.org. (for Chronology of Bishops) ^{[self-published]}
- Chow, Gabriel. "Archdiocese of Santiago de Compostela (Spain)". GCatholic.org. (for Chronology of Bishops) ^{[self-published]}

Catholic Church titles
Preceded by Antonio Luján Luján	Bishop of Mondoñedo; 1574–1582	Succeeded by Isidoro Caja de la Jara
Preceded by Francisco Blanco Salcedo	Archbishop of Santiago de Compostela; 1582	Succeeded by Alonso Velázquez
