= Rodrigo de Luna =

Archbishop of Santiago de Compostela from 1449 to 1460

Most Reverend Rodrigo de Luna
- Archbishop of Santiago de Compostela
- Church: Catholic Church
- Archdiocese: Archdiocese of Santiago de Compostela
- In office: 1449–1460
- Predecessor: Álvaro Núñez de Isorna
- Successor: Alonso de Fonseca y Acevedo

Personal details
- Died: 1460 Santiago de Compostela, Spain

Rodrigo de Luna (died 1460) was a Roman Catholic prelate who served as Archbishop of Santiago de Compostela (1449–1460).

== Biography ==
On 7 April 1449, Rodrigo de Luna was appointed during the papacy of Pope Nicholas V as Archbishop of Santiago de Compostela. He served as Archbishop of Santiago de Compostela until his death in 1460. While bishop, he was the principal consecrator of Pedro González de Mendoza, Bishop of Calahorra y La Calzada (1454).

== External links and additional sources ==
- Cheney, David M. "Archdiocese of Santiago de Compostela". Catholic-Hierarchy.org. (for Chronology of Bishops) ^{[self-published]}
- Chow, Gabriel. "Archdiocese of Santiago de Compostela (Spain)". GCatholic.org. (for Chronology of Bishops) ^{[self-published]}

Catholic Church titles
Preceded by Álvaro Núñez de Isorna	Archbishop of Santiago de Compostela; 1449–1460	Succeeded by Alonso de Fonseca y Acevedo
