= Diego de la Calzada =

Spanish Roman Catholic prelate

Most Reverend Diego de la Calzada
- Auxiliary Bishop of Toledo
- Church: Catholic Church
- Archdiocese: Archdiocese of Toledo
- In office: 1578–1589?

Orders
- Consecration: 1578

Diego de la Calzada was a Roman Catholic prelate who served as Auxiliary Bishop of Toledo (1578–1589?).

== Biography ==
On 17 February 1578, Diego de la Calzada was appointed during the papacy of Pope Gregory XIII as Auxiliary Bishop of Toledo and Titular Bishop of Salona. While bishop, he was the principal co-consecrator of Francisco Trujillo García, Bishop of León (1578); Antonio Manrique, Bishop of Calahorra y La Calzada (1587); Antonio Zapata y Cisneros, Bishop of Cádiz (1587); Pedro Portocarrero (bishop, died 1600), Bishop of Calahorra y La Calzada (1589), and Juan de Zuazola, Bishop of Astorga (1589).

== External links and additional sources ==
- Cheney, David M. "Salona (Titular See)". Catholic-Hierarchy.org. (for Chronology of Bishops) ^{[self-published]}
- Chow, Gabriel. "Titular Episcopal See of Salona (Italy)". GCatholic.org. (for Chronology of Bishops) ^{[self-published]}
