= Juan de Sanclemente Torquemada =

Roman Catholic prelate

Most Reverend Juan de Sanclemente Torquemada
- Archbishop of Santiago de Compostela
- Church: Catholic Church
- Archdiocese: Archdiocese of Santiago de Compostela
- In office: 1587–1602
- Predecessor: Alonso Velázquez
- Successor: Maximilian of Austria
- Previous post: Bishop of Ourense (1578–1587)

Orders
- Consecration: 25 January 1579 by Francisco Blanco Salcedo

Personal details
- Born: 19 August 1534 Córdoba, Spain
- Died: 20 April 1602 (age 67) Santiago de Compostela, Spain

Juan de Sanclemente Torquemada (19 August 1534 – 20 April 1602) was a Roman Catholic prelate who served as Archbishop of Santiago de Compostela (1587–1602) and Bishop of Ourense (1578–1587).

== Biography ==
Juan de Sanclemente Torquemada was born in Córdoba, Spain. On 7 July 1578, he was appointed during the papacy of Pope Gregory XIII as Bishop of Ourense. On 25 January 1579, he was consecrated bishop by Francisco Blanco Salcedo, Archbishop of Santiago de Compostela, with Fernando Vellosillo Barrio, Bishop of Lugo, and Diego Torquemada, Bishop of Tui, serving as co-consecrators. On 27 July 1587, he was appointed during the papacy of Pope Sixtus V as Archbishop of Santiago de Compostela. He served as Archbishop of Santiago de Compostela until his death on 20 April 1602.

== Episcopal succession ==
While bishop, he was the principal consecrator of Miguel Ares Canaval, Bishop of Orense (1595); Francisco de Tolosa, Bishop of Tui (1597); and Francisco Terrones del Caño, Bishop of Tui (1601).

== External links and additional sources ==
- Cheney, David M. "Diocese of Orense". Catholic-Hierarchy.org. (for Chronology of Bishops) ^{[self-published]}
- Chow, Gabriel. "Diocese of Orense (Spain)". GCatholic.org. (for Chronology of Bishops) ^{[self-published]}
- Cheney, David M. "Archdiocese of Santiago de Compostela". Catholic-Hierarchy.org. (for Chronology of Bishops) ^{[self-published]}
- Chow, Gabriel. "Archdiocese of Santiago de Compostela (Spain)". GCatholic.org. (for Chronology of Bishops) ^{[self-published]}

Catholic Church titles
Preceded by Fernando Tricio Arenzana	Bishop of Ourense; 1578–1587	Succeeded by Pedro González Acevedo
Preceded by Alonso Velázquez	Archbishop of Santiago de Compostela; 1587–1602	Succeeded by Maximilian of Austria
