= Alonso de Fonseca y Ulloa =

Roman Catholic prelate

Most Reverend Alonso de Fonseca y Ulloa
- Archbishop of Seville
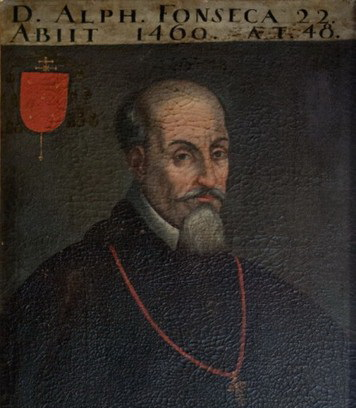
- Church: Catholic Church
- Archdiocese: Archdiocese of Seville
- In office: 1469–1473
- Predecessor: Alonso de Fonseca y Acevedo
- Successor: Pietro Riario
- Previous posts: Bishop of Ávila (1545–1454); Archbishop of Seville (1454–1465); Archbishop of Santiago de Compostela (1465–1469)

Personal details
- Died: 18 May 1473 Seville, Spain

Alonso de Fonseca (c. 1415 – 18 May 1473) was a Castilian prelate and political figure who played a significant role in governing the Kingdom of Castile during Henry IV's reign. Born into a prominent family of Portuguese origin, he pursued an ecclesiastical career under the patronage of influential relatives. He held major offices, including Bishop of Ávila, Archbishop of Seville and Archbishop of Santiago de Compostela. Closely associated with the royal court from his early service to the future king, he became a member of the royal council and a key intermediary in political negotiations among competing noble factions. His career included periods of influence and setbacks, especially during conflicts involving Juan Pacheco and the civil strife of the 1460s, where he often acted as a mediator. He participated in major political settlements, including the Treaty of the Bulls of Guisando. He helped consolidate royal authority while advancing his family's interests through ecclesiastical appointments. In later years, his activity declined due to illness, and he died at Coca in 1473. He was also noted for his patronage of learning and the arts, maintaining a substantial library and supporting contemporary scholars.

== Biography ==
Alonso de Fonseca was born around 1415 into a prominent family in the ruling elite of Toro. He was the grandson of the exiled Portuguese nobleman Pedro Rodríguez de Fonseca and the third son of Juan Alonso de Ulloa, advisor and royal judge to Henry III and John II, and Beatriz Rodríguez de Fonseca. After the early death of his father, he was directed toward an ecclesiastical career under the patronage of his maternal uncle, Cardinal Pedro de Fonseca. Following the cardinal’s death, his paternal uncle, Pedro Yáñez de Ulloa, oversaw his education and advancement. By 1435, he had completed his religious training, and his first ecclesiastical benefice came with his appointment as archdeacon of Sanlés in the cathedral of Santiago de Compostela.

Fonseca entered the household of Prince Henry, the future Henry IV of Castile, as chief chaplain in the early 1440s. His association with the prince proved decisive for his career. With the backing of the prince, he accumulated ecclesiastical and political offices. He was promoted to abbot of Valladolid around 1440, and by 1442 was appointed dean of the cathedral of Zamora. However, his great opportunity came in 1445, when he was consecrated bishop of Ávila. This diocese was one of the most coveted in the Church hierarchy. He became archbishop of Seville in 1454 and held positions within the royal administration, including membership in the Royal Council. He also acquired lordships such as Coca and Alaejos.

During the last years of John II's reign, Fonseca collaborated closely with Juan Pacheco, Marquis of Villena, a favorite of Prince Henry. In this period, he acted as an intermediary between the king and the prince, and between their respective factions. His role as a negotiator emerged at this stage and continued throughout his life. He participated in efforts to manage tensions between competing centers of power within the monarchy, including those associated with Álvaro de Luna and Pacheco.

When Henry IV ascended the throne in 1454, Fonseca’s influence increased. He became one of the king’s principal advisors and, alongside Pacheco, participated in directing governmental affairs during the early years of the reign.

In June 1460, following the vacancy in the archbishopric of Santiago de Compostela, the monarch sought a reliable figure in Santiago to resolve internal conflicts within the archdiocese. Fonseca proposed to address the issue with the appointment of his nephew as the new archbishop. His plan involved exchanging sees so that his nephew would become archbishop of Seville, while Fonseca, as the more experienced prelate, would oversee the pacification of Santiago. Afterward, they would revert to their original archbishoprics. Henry IV approved this arrangement, which also received papal sanction. However, Pacheco desired the See of Santiago for his cousin, the Bishop of Burgos, Luis de Acuña. Pacheco demanded that Fonseca compel his nephew to resign in favor of his cousin but Fonseca refused. This refusal, combined with previous tensions, led to the dissolution of the alliance between Fonseca and Pacheco.

By July 1461, Fonseca’s brother Fernando de Fonseca had taken control of Santiago. Still, bringing peace to the archbishopric was difficult because of ongoing political struggles and rival nobles, led by Bernal Yáñez de Moscoso, who tried to take the city from Fonseca’s supporters in 1463. These problems grew worse as Fonseca lost influence at court due to his conflict with Pacheco and the rise of new rivals, Beltrán de la Cueva and Pedro González de Mendoza, who replaced him in the king’s favor.

To regain favor with the king, Fonseca considered it necessary to distance himself from the conflict in Santiago de Compostela. In 1463, he obtained papal bulls from Rome to reclaim the see of Seville. His nephew initially resisted the transfer with support from local groups in Seville, but ultimately, he complied under royal and papal pressure.

Fonseca stayed near Seville in early 1464, waiting for the return of the diocese’s property. Meanwhile, his enemies were plotting against him. In May 1464, a group of nobles, led by Pacheco and the Archbishop of Toledo, started a revolt against the king. They began talks with the king, but the Marquis of Villena refused to continue unless Henry IV first acted against Fonseca. At the same time, Pacheco convinced the Mendoza family, who controlled the Royal Council, to move against Fonseca by suggesting that Pedro González de Mendoza could take over the Sevillian diocese.

The royal court then ordered Fonseca’s arrest. But the Marquis of Villena secretly warned Fonseca about the plan, hoping to win his support for the rebels. After the warning, Fonseca fled Seville. His property was taken, his towns of Coca and Alaejos were attacked, and the pope was asked to remove him from office. Fonseca and his nephew, now on good terms, joined the rebels’ demands against the king and supported the Burgos Manifesto in September 1464.

During the subsequent civil conflict, Fonseca consistently favored negotiation. After Henry IV’s symbolic deposition at Ávila in 1465, Fonseca once again supported the king and worked to broker settlements with opposing factions. His moderate stance enabled him to serve as an intermediary. He presided over the Royal Council when other leaders withdrew in protest of the king’s policies.

In 1467, after expulsion from court by the Mendoza family, Fonseca temporarily joined the faction supporting Infante Alfonso, the rival claimant to the throne. Despite this realignment, he continued to advocate negotiation over conflict and attempted to dissuade Henry IV from pursuing military action. The ensuing campaign resulted in a battle in which his brother Fernando was fatally wounded.

Later in 1467, Fonseca reestablished contact with Henry IV and contributed to renewed negotiations among the factions. He returned to the Royal Council and was entrusted with the custody of Queen Joanna as a guarantee of the king’s commitments. The death of Infante Alfonso in 1468 altered the political landscape. Fonseca participated in negotiations that led to the Treaty of the Bulls of Guisando, which recognized Henry IV as king and named Isabella as heir.

In the later years of Henry IV’s reign, Fonseca concentrated on consolidating the crown’s position and maintaining alliances with the nobility. He furthered his family’s interests by promoting relatives to ecclesiastical offices, including bishoprics in Ávila and Ourense. Although he did not secure all the promised lordships, his control over key sees increased his family’s influence within the kingdom.

Following Isabella’s marriage to Ferdinand of Aragon in 1469, Fonseca supported Juana la Beltraneja’s claims and aligned himself with the king’s succession policies. His political activity diminished as his health deteriorated. Fonseca spent his final years at his estate in Coca, where he died on May 18, 1473. His estate was inherited by his nephew, also named Alonso de Fonseca.

== Ecclesiastic positions ==
In 1445, Alonso de Fonseca y Ulloa was appointed by the King of Spain and confirmed by Pope Eugene IV as Bishop of Ávila. On 4 February 1454, he was appointed by Pope Nicholas V as Archbishop of Seville. In 1465, he was appointed by Pope Paul II as Archbishop of Santiago de Compostela. In 1469, he was re-appointed by Pope Paul II to his prior position as Archbishop of Seville where he served until his death on 18 May 1473.

While bishop, he was the principal co-consecrator of Pedro González de Mendoza, Bishop of Calahorra y La Calzada (1454).

== Sources ==
- González Nieto, Diego (2022). "Alonso de Fonseca y Ulloa". Real Academia de la Historia (in Spanish).
- Marino, Nancy F. (2006). Don Juan Pacheco: wealth and power in late medieval Spain. Tempe, Ariz: ACMRS (Arizona Center for Medieval and Renaissance Studies). ISBN 978-0-86698-356-3.
- "Alonso I de Fonseca (1418–1473)". MCN Biografías (in Spanish). 2025.

== External links and additional sources ==
- Cheney, David M. "Archdiocese of Santiago de Compostela". Catholic-Hierarchy.org. (for Chronology of Bishops) ^{[self-published]}
- Chow, Gabriel. "Archdiocese of Santiago de Compostela (Spain)". GCatholic.org. (for Chronology of Bishops) ^{[self-published]}
- Cheney, David M. "Archdiocese of Sevilla {Seville}". Catholic-Hierarchy.org. (for Chronology of Bishops) ^{[self-published]}
- Chow, Gabriel. "Metropolitan Archdiocese of Sevilla (Italy)". GCatholic.org. (for Chronology of Bishops) ^{[self-published]}
- Cheney, David M. "Diocese of Ávila". Catholic-Hierarchy.org. (for Chronology of Bishops) ^{[self-published]}
- Chow, Gabriel. "Diocese of Ávila". GCatholic.org. (for Chronology of Bishops) ^{[self-published]}

Catholic Church titles
Preceded by Lope de Barrientos	Bishop of Ávila; 1445–1454	Succeeded by Alonso Fernández de Madrigal
Preceded by Juan de Cervantes	Archbishop of Seville (1st time); 1454–1465	Succeeded by Alonso de Fonseca y Acevedo
Preceded by Alonso de Fonseca y Acevedo	Archbishop of Santiago de Compostela; 1465–1469	Succeeded by Alonso de Fonseca y Acevedo
Preceded by Alonso de Fonseca y Acevedo	Archbishop of Seville (2nd time); 1469–1473	Succeeded by Pietro Riario
