= Sebastián Pérez (bishop) =

Most Reverend Sebastián Pérez
- Bishop of Osma
- Church: Catholic Church
- Diocese: Osma
- In office: 1583–1593
- Predecessor: Alonso Velázquez
- Successor: Martín Garnica

Personal details
- Born: Montilla, Spain
- Died: 27 July 1593 Osma, Spain

Sebastián Pérez (died 1593) was a Roman Catholic prelate who served as Bishop of Osma (1583–1593).

== Biography ==
Sebastián Pérez was born in Montilla, Spain. On 9 March 1583, he was appointed during the papacy of Pope Gregory XIII as Bishop of Osma. He served as Bishop of Osma until his death on 27 July 1593.

== Episcopal succession ==
While bishop, he was the principal consecrator of:

- Pedro González Acevedo, Bishop of Orense (1587);

and principal co-consecrator of:

- Antonio Manrique, Bishop of Calahorra y La Calzada (1587);
- Antonio Zapata y Cisneros, Bishop of Cádiz (1587);
- Pedro Portocarrero, Bishop of Calahorra y La Calzada (1589); and
- Juan de Zuazola, Bishop of Astorga (1589).

== External links and additional sources ==
- Cheney, David M. "Diocese of Osma-Soria". Catholic-Hierarchy.org. (for Chronology of Bishops) ^{[self-published]}
- Chow, Gabriel. "Diocese of Osma-Soria (Italy)". GCatholic.org. (for Chronology of Bishops) ^{[self-published]}

Catholic Church titles
Preceded by Alonso Velázquez	Bishop of Osma; 1583–1593	Succeeded by Martín Garnica
