= Gatón de Campos =

Coordinates: 42°03′N 4°59′W

Gatón de Campos, Spain
- Coat of arms

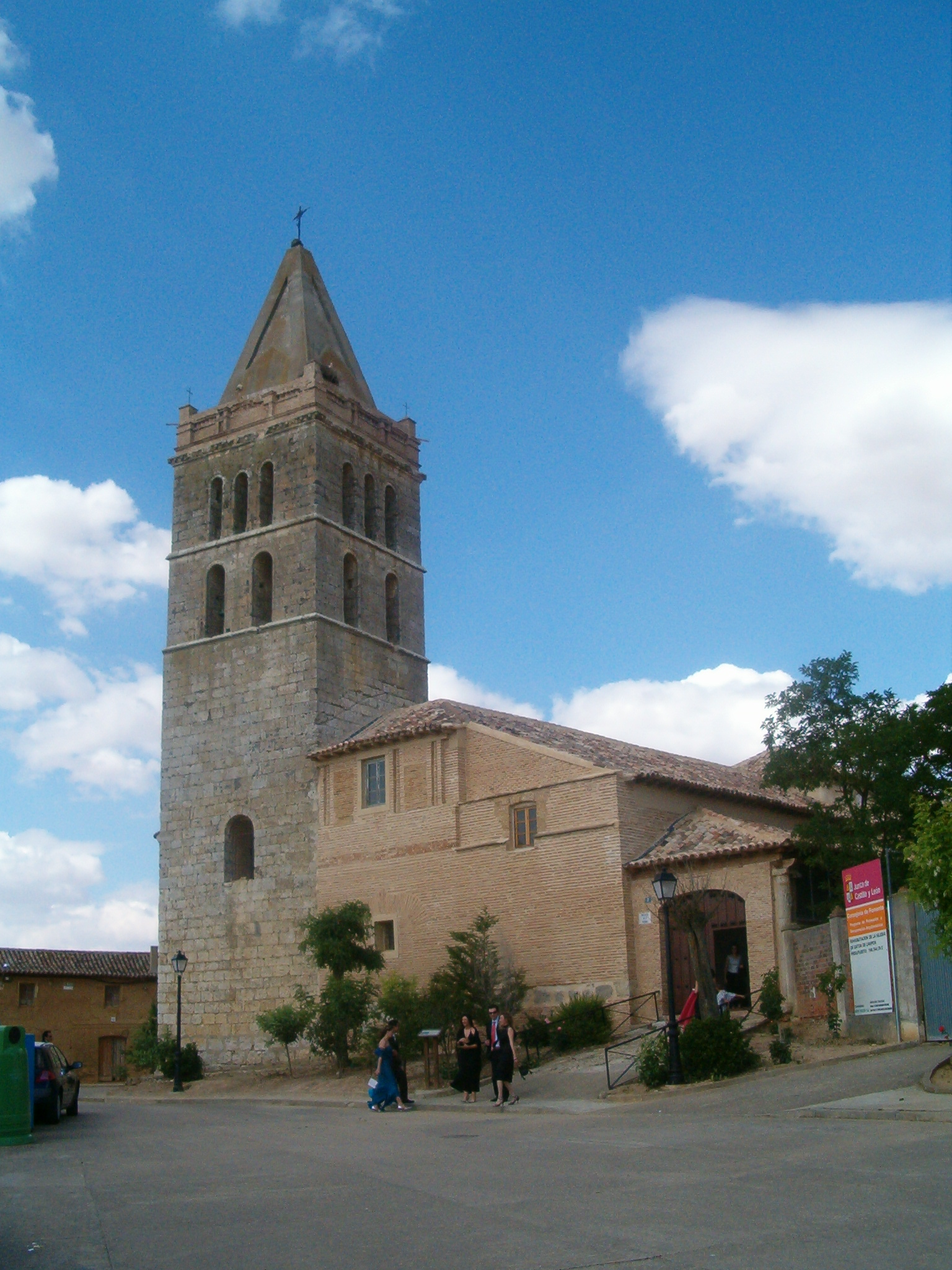
- Church of San pedro.
- Country: Spain
- Autonomous community: Castile and León
- Province: Valladolid
- Municipality: Gatón de Campos

Area
  - Total: 20 km^{2} (7.7 sq mi)

Population (2025-01-01)
  - Total: 46
  - Density: 2.3/km^{2} (6.0/sq mi)
- Time zone: UTC+1 (CET)
  - Summer (DST): UTC+2 (CEST)
- Website: gatondecampos.gago.info

Gatón de Campos is a municipality located in the province of Valladolid, Castile and León, Spain. According to the 2004 census (INE), the municipality has a population of 40 inhabitants.
