= Maximilian of Austria (bishop) =

Roman Catholic prelate

Most Reverend Maximiliano de Austria
- Archbishop of Santiago de Compostela
- Church: Catholic Church
- Archdiocese: Archdiocese of Santiago de Compostela
- In office: 1603–1614
- Predecessor: Juan de Sanclemente Torquemada
- Successor: Juan Beltrán Guevara y Figueroa
- Previous posts: Bishop of Cádiz (1596–1601); Bishop of Segovia (1601–1603)

Orders
- Consecration: 16 Feb 1597 by Bernardo Sandoval Rojas

Personal details
- Born: 13 Nov 1555 Jaén, Spain
- Died: 1 Jul 1614 (age 58) Santiago de Compostela, Spain

Maximiliano de Austria (13 November 1555 – 1 July 1614) was a Roman Catholic prelate who served as Archbishop of Santiago de Compostela (1603–1614), Bishop of Segovia (1601–1603), and Bishop of Cádiz (1596–1601).

== Biography ==
Maximiliano de Austria was born in Jaén, Spain as an illegitimate son of Leopoldo de Austria, Bishop of Córdoba and an illegitimate son of Maximilian I, Holy Roman Emperor. On 23 September 1596, he was appointed during the papacy of Pope Clement VIII as Bishop of Cádiz. On 16 February 1597, he was consecrated bishop by Bernardo Sandoval Rojas, Bishop of Jaén. On 27 August 1601, he was appointed during the papacy of Pope Clement VIII as Bishop of Segovia. On 21 April 1603, he was appointed during the papacy of Pope Clement VIII as Archbishop of Santiago de Compostela. He served as Archbishop of Santiago de Compostela until his death on 1 July 1614.

According to Manuel Gago Mariño, the sculptures at the base of the Maximilian Staircase of the Santiago de Compostela Cathedral, directed by Maximilian are also related to the Battle of Clavijo.

== See also ==
- Catholic Church in Spain

== External links and additional sources ==
- Cheney, David M. "Diocese of Cádiz y Ceuta". Catholic-Hierarchy.org. (for Chronology of Bishops) ^{[self-published]}
- Chow, Gabriel. "Diocese of Cádiz y Ceuta (Spain)". GCatholic.org. (for Chronology of Bishops) ^{[self-published]}
- Cheney, David M. "Diocese of Segovia". Catholic-Hierarchy.org. (for Chronology of Bishops) ^{[self-published]}
- Chow, Gabriel. "Diocese of Segovia (Spain)". GCatholic.org. (for Chronology of Bishops) ^{[self-published]}
- Cheney, David M. "Archdiocese of Santiago de Compostela". Catholic-Hierarchy.org. (for Chronology of Bishops) ^{[self-published]}
- Chow, Gabriel. "Archdiocese of Santiago de Compostela (Spain)". GCatholic.org. (for Chronology of Bishops) ^{[self-published]}

Catholic Church titles
| Preceded by Antonio Zapata y Cisneros | Bishop of Cádiz; 1596–1601 | Succeeded by Gómez Suárez Figueroa |
| Preceded by Andrés Pacheco | Bishop of Segovia; 1601–1603 | Succeeded by Pedro Castro Nero |
| Preceded by Juan de Sanclemente Torquemada | Archbishop of Santiago de Compostela; 1603–1614 | Succeeded by Juan Beltrán Guevara y Figueroa |
