= Valencia del Ventoso =

- Municipality
- Coat of arms
- Interactive map of Valencia del Ventoso
- Coordinates: 37°09′N 5°55′W
- Country: Spain
- Autonomous community: Extremadura
- Province: Badajoz

Area
  - Total: 99 km^{2} (38 sq mi)
- Elevation: 500 m (1,600 ft)

Population (2025-01-01)
  - Total: 1,870
  - Density: 19/km^{2} (49/sq mi)
- Time zone: UTC+1 (CET)
  - Summer (DST): UTC+2 (CEST)

Valencia del Ventoso is a municipality located in the province of Badajoz, Extremadura, Spain. According to the 2006 census (INE), the municipality has a population of 2,325 inhabitants.

== See also ==
- List of municipalities in Badajoz
