= Isidoro Caja de la Jara =

Spanish Roman Catholic prelate

Most Reverend Isidoro Caja de la Jara
- Bishop of Mondoñedo
- Church: Catholic Church
- Archdiocese: Diocese of Mondoñedo
- In office: 1582–1593
- Predecessor: Juan de Liermo Hermosa
- Successor: Gonzalo Gutiérrez Montilla

Orders
- Consecration: 1583

Personal details
- Died: 26 May 1593 Mondoñedo, Spain

Isidoro Caja de la Jara (died 26 May 1593) was a Roman Catholic prelate who served as Bishop of Mondoñedo from 1582 to 1593.

== Biography ==
On 20 December 1582, Isidoro Caja de la Jara was selected by the King of Spain and confirmed by Pope Gregory XIII as Bishop of Mondoñedo. In 1583, he was consecrated as bishop. He served as Bishop of Mondoñedo until his death on 26 May 1593.

Catholic Church titles
Preceded by Juan de Liermo Hermosa	Bishop of Mondoñedo; 1582–1593	Succeeded by Gonzalo Gutiérrez Montilla
