= Diocese of Osma-Soria =

Roman Catholic diocese in Spain

Diocese of Osma-Soria Dioecesis Oxomensis-Soriana Diócesis de Osma-Soria

Catholic
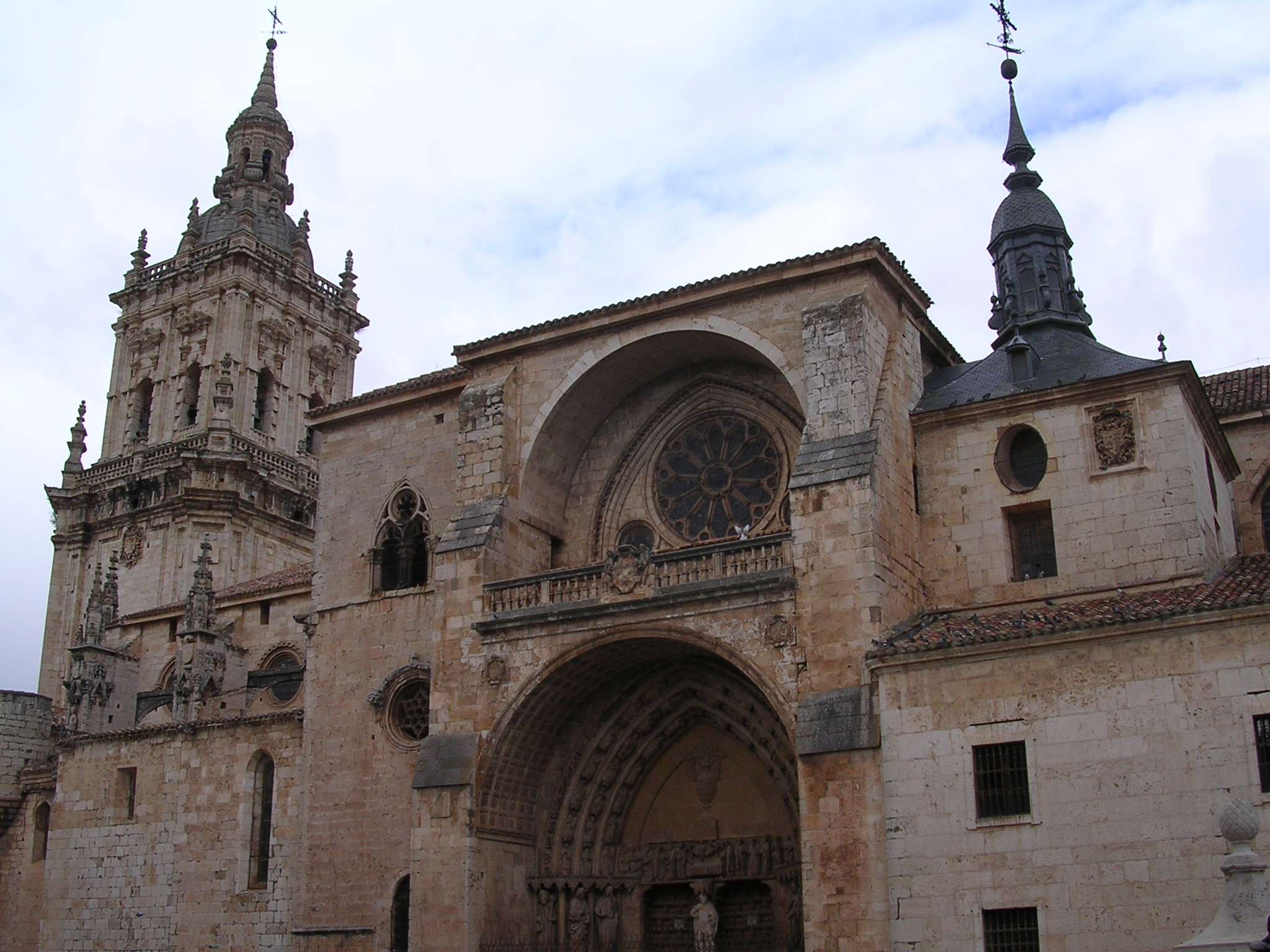
- Burgo de Osma Cathedral

Location
- Country: Spain
- Ecclesiastical province: Burgos
- Metropolitan: Burgos
- Coordinates: 41°35′09″N 3°04′15″W

Statistics
- Area: 10,328 km^{2} (3,988 sq mi)
- Population: Total; Catholics: (as of 2013); 95,700; 76,900 (80.4%)

Information
- Denomination: Catholic Church
- Sui iuris church: Latin Church
- Rite: Roman Rite
- Cathedral: Cathedral of the Assumption of Our Lady in Burgo de Osma
- Co-cathedral: Co-Cathedral of St Peter in Soria

Current leadership
- Pope: Leo XIV
- Bishop: Vacant
- Metropolitan Archbishop: Francisco Gil Hellín

Website
- Website of the Diocese

The Diocese of Osma-Soria (Latin: Oxomen(sis)–Sorian(a)) is a Latin Church ecclesiastical territory or diocese of the Catholic Church in northern Spain. It is a suffragan diocese in the ecclesiastical province of the metropolitan Archdiocese of Burgos. Its cathedral episcopal see is Catedral de Santa María de la Asunción, dedicated to the Assumption of Mary, in El Burgo de Osma. It also has a co-cathedral, Concatedral de San Pedro, dedicated to St. Peter, in Soria, and a minor basilica: Basílica de Nuestra Señora de los Miagros Miagros, in Ágreda, Soria, Castile and León, Spain.

== History ==
- Established circa 600 as Diocese of Osma
- Lost territory in 1077 to the Diocese of Nájera
- Renamed on 9 March 1959 as Diocese of Osma-Soria, as Soria gets a co-cathedral

== Statistics ==
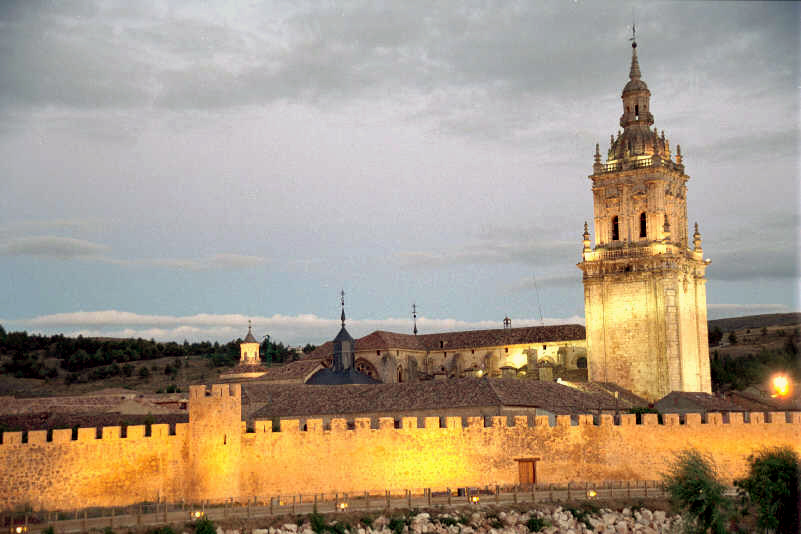
Catedral de Santa María de la Asunción and city walls

As per 2014, it pastorally served 80,000 Catholics (85.8% of 93,291 total) on 10,287 km^{2} in 542 parishes and 19 missions with 128 priests (103 diocesan, 25 religious), 212 lay religious (38 brothers, 174 sisters) and 1 seminarian.

== Episcopal ordinaries ==
very incomplete : lacking first centuries

Bishops of Osma

- Pedro de Bourges, Benedictine Order (O.S.B.) (1101 – death 1109.08.02)
- Raimundo (1109–1124), next Metropolitan Archbishop of Toledo (Spain) (1124 – death 1152)
- Beltrán (1126 – death 1140.10.01)
- Esteban (1141 – death 1147.09.01)
- Juan (1148 – death 1174.04.28)
- Bernardo (1174–1176)
- Miguel, O.S.B. (1177–1184)
- García (1185–1186)
- Martín Bazán (1188 – death 1201.07.27)
- Diego de Acebes (1201 – 1207.12.30)
- Rodrigo Jiménez de Rada, Cistercian Order (O. Cist.) (1208 – 1208 ? 27 Feb 1209)
- Menendo (1210–1225)
- Pedro Ramírez de Piedrola (1225–1230), next Bishop of Pamplona (Spain) (1231 – death 1238.10.05)
- Juan de Soria (1231 – 1240.05.29), next Bishop of Burgos (Spain) (1240.05.29 – 1246)
- Pedro de Peñafiel (1241 – death 1246.04.12)
- Gil(les) (27 March 1247 – death 4 August 1261)
- Agustin Pérez (18 Oct 1261 – death 12 April 1286)
- Juan Alvarez (bishop) (4 May 1286 – death 20 Oct 1296)
- Juan Pérez de Ascaron (1296 – death 1329)
- Bernabé (1329.10.20 – death 1351), previously Bishop of Badajoz (Spain) (1324.07.27 – 1329.10.20)
- Gonzalo (1351–1354)
- Alfonso Fernando de Toledo y Vargas, Augustinians (O.E.S.A.) (1354.10.25 – 1363.10.13), later Metropolitan Archbishop of Sevilla (Andalusia, southern Spain) (1363.10.13 – 1366); previously Bishop of Badajoz (Spain) (1353.02.13 – 1354.10.25)
- Lorenzo Pérez (1362.12.13 – death 1367)
- Pedro Gomez Barroso (19 July 1368 – 4 March 1373), next Bishop of Cuenca (Spain) (1373–1378)
- Juan García Palomeque (4 March 1373 – death 1374), previously Bishop of Badajoz (Spain) (1354.10.25 – 1373.03.04)
- Juan de Villareal (1374 – death 1379.02.22)
- Pedro Fernández de Frías (21 March 1379 – resigned? 1404), also/next Pseudocardinal-Priest of S. Prassede (1396? – 1412.09.23▼), Archpriest of Papal Basilica of St. Peter (1412 – 1420.09.19▼), promoted Pseudocardinal-Bishop of Suburbicarian Diocese of Sabina (1412.09.23 – death 1420.09.19▼) but also Pseudocardinal-Priest of above S. Prassede in commendam (1412.09.23 – 1419.06.26?▼) and next Pseudocardinal-Priest of S. Cecilia in commendam (1419.06.26 – 1420.09.19▼)
- Apostolic Administrator Alfonso Carrillo de Albornoz (28 Nov 1408 – death 14 March 1434), while Pseudocardinal-Deacon of S. Eustachio (1408.09.22 – 1418.08.01▼); later (canonical) Apostolic Administrator of Sigüenza (Spain) (1422 – ?), promoted Cardinal-Priest of Ss. Quattro Coronati (1423.01 – death 1434.03.14), Archpriest of Papal Archbasilica of St. John Lateran (1428 – 1434.03.14)
- Juan de Cerezuela y Luna (1422–1433), next Metropolitan Archbishop of Sevilla (Spain) (1433 – 1434), Metropolitan Archbishop of Toledo (Spain) (1434 – 1442)
- Pedro de Castilla de Eril (22 April 1433 – 6 April 1440), next Bishop of Palencia (Spain) (1440.04 – 1461.04.28)
- Roberto Moya (1440 – death 1453.11.13)
- Pedro García de Montoya (Huete) (9 Jan 1454 – death 18 Feb 1475)
- Francisco de Santillana (1475.05.04 – 1482.03.06), next Bishop of Córdoba (Spain) (1482.03.06 – 1482 not possessed)
  - Apostolic Administrator Cardinal Pedro González de Mendoza (1482.07.08 – 1482.11), while Apostolic Administrator of Archdiocese of Sevilla (Spain) (1474.05.09 – 1482.11.13), Apostolic Administrator of Diocese of Sigüenza (Spain) (1474.05.09 – 1495.01.11), transferred Cardinal-Priest of S. Croce in Gerusalemme (1478.07.06 – death 1495.01.11); previously Bishop of Calahorra y La Calzada (Spain) (1453.11.28 – 1467.10.30), Bishop of above Sigüenza (1467.10.30 – 1474.05.09), created Cardinal-Priest of S. Maria in Domnica pro hac vice Title (1473.05.17 – 1478.07.06); later Latin Patriarch of Alexandria (1482.11.13 – 1495.01.11) and Metropolitan Archbishop of Toledo (Spain) (1482.11.13 – 1495.01.11)
  - Apostolic Administrator Cardinal Raffaele Riario (1483.01.15 – 1493.05), while Apostolic Administrator of Archdiocese of Pisa (Italy) (1479.09.17 – 1499.06.03), transferred Cardinal-Deacon of S. Lorenzo in Damaso pro illa vice Deaconry (1480.05.05 – 1503.11.29), Apostolic Administrator of Diocese of Tréguier (France) (1480.08.18 – 1483.05.16), Apostolic Administrator of Diocese of Salamanca (Spain) (1482.07.08 – 1483), Chamberlain of the Holy Roman Church of Reverend Apostolic Camera (1483.01.24 – 1521.07.09); previously Cardinal-Deacon of S. Giorgio in Velabro (1477.12.12 – 1480.05.05), Apostolic Administrator of Diocese of Camerino (Italy) (1478.07.27 – 1479.09.17), Apostolic Administrator of Diocese of Cuenca (Spain) (1479.08.13 – 1482.07); later again Apostolic Administrator of Cuenca (1493.05.24 – 1521.07.09), Apostolic Administrator of Diocese of Tuscanella (1498.08.28 – 1506.09.16), Apostolic Administrator of Diocese of Viterbo (Italy) (1498.08.28 – 1506.09.16), Protodeacon of Sacred College of Cardinals (1503.09 – 1503.11.29), promoted Cardinal-Bishop of Suburbicarian Diocese of Albano (1503.11.29 – 1507.08.03), also Cardinal-Priest of S. Lorenzo in Damaso in commendam (1503.11.29 – 1517.06.22), promoted Cardinal-Bishop of Suburbicarian Diocese of Sabina (1507.08.03 [1507.09.10] – 1508.09.22), Apostolic Administrator of Diocese of Arezzo (Italy) (1508.07.07 – 1511.11.05), transferred Cardinal-Bishop of Suburbicarian Diocese of Porto e Santa Rufina (1508.09.22 – 1511.01.20), Cardinal Vice-Dean of Sacred College of Cardinals (1508.09.22 – 1511.01.20), Apostolic Administrator of Diocese of Savona (Italy) (1508.12.05 – 1516.04.09), transferred Cardinal-Bishop of Suburbicarian Diocese of Ostia–Velletri (1511.01.20 – ?1517.06.22), Cardinal Dean of Sacred College of Cardinals (1511.01.20 – 1521.07.09), Apostolic Administrator of Diocese of Malta (Malta) (1516.05.23 – 1520), Apostolic Administrator of Diocese of Lucca (Italy) (1517.03.09 – 1517.11.12), ?again Cardinal-Bishop of Ostia–Velletri (?1517.07.24 – death 1521.07.09), Apostolic Administrator of Diocese of Malaga (Balearic Spain) (1518.04.12 – 1518.09.03), again Apostolic Administrator of Archdiocese of Pisa (Italy) (1518.09.03 – retired 1518.09.10)
- Alfonso de Fonseca (1493 – death 1505), previously Bishop of Ávila (Spain) (1469–1485), Bishop of Cuenca (Spain) (1485–1493)
  - Auxiliary Bishop: García de Chinchilla, O.P. (1500.09.18 – death 1502), Titular Bishop of Byblus (1500.09.18 – 1502)
- Alfonso Enríquez (19 December 1505 – death 15 October 1523)
  - Auxiliary Bishop: Blas de Fernando, Cistercian Order (O. Cist.- (1507.04.19 – ?), Titular Bishop of above Byblus (1507.04.19 – ?)
- Juan Pardo Tavera (31 December 1523 – 8 June 1524), previously Bishop of Ciudad Rodrigo (Spain) (1514.07.14 – 1523.12.31); later Metropolitan Archbishop of Santiago de Compostela (Spain) (1524.06.08 –retired 1534.04.27), created Cardinal-Priest of S. Giovanni a Porta Latina (1531.04.27 – death 1545.08.01), Metropolitan Archbishop of Toledo (Spain) (1534.04.27 – 1545.08.01)
- García de Loaysa y Mendoza, Order of Preachers (O.P.) (8 June 1524 – 23 February 1532), previously Master of the Dominican Order (O.P.) (1518.05.23 – 1524.06.08), created Cardinal-Priest of S. Susanna (1530.05.16 – death 1546.04.22), Bishop of Sigüenza (Spain) (1532.02.23 – 1539.05.21), Metropolitan Archbishop of Sevilla (Spain) (1539.05.21 – 1546.04.22)
- Pedro González Manso (13 March 1532 – death 12 February 1537), previously Bishop of Guadix (Spain) (1523.08.31 – 1524.10.26), Bishop of Tui (Spain) (1524.10.26 – 1525.07.03), Bishop of Badajoz (Spain) (1525.07.03 – 1532.03.13)
- Pedro Alvarez de Acosta (21 May 1539 – death 20 February 1563), previously Bishop of Porto (Portugal) (1507.02.12 – 1535.01.08), Bishop of León (Spain) (1535.01.08 – 1539.05.21)
- Honorato Juan (1 March 1564 – death 30 July 1566)
- Francisco Tello Sandoval (3 March 1567 – 13 June 1578), next Bishop of Plasencia (Spain) (1578.06.13 – death 1580.07.08)
- Alonso Velázquez (13 June 1578 – 9 March 1583), next Metropolitan Archbishop of Santiago de Compostela (Spain) (1583.03.09 – death 1587.01.14)
- Sebastián Pérez (bishop) (9 May 1583 – death 27 July 1593 Died)
- Martín Garnica (27 April 1594 – death 20 November 1594 Died)
- Pedro Rojas Henríques, Order of Saint Augustine (O.S.A.) (30 August 1595 – death 9 March 1602), previously Bishop of Astorga (Spain) (1591.03.06 – 1595.08.30)
- Enrique Enríquez, O.E.S.A. (1602.11.15 – 1610.06.21), next Bishop of Plasencia (Spain) (1610.06.21 – death 1622.01.22)
- Fernando Acevedo González (July 1610 – 2 June 1613), next Metropolitan Archbishop of Burgos (Spain) (1613.06.02 – 1629)
- Francisco de Sosa, O.F.M. (23 September 1613 – death 1618)
- Cristóbal de Lobera y Torres (9 July 1618 – 6 March 1623)
- Alsono Martín de Zuñiga (23 March 1623 – 21 June 1630 Died)
- Domingo Pimentel Zúñiga, O.P. (2 October 1630 – 18 July 1633)
- Francisco Villafañe (5 September 1633 – 26 August 1639 Died)
- Martín Carrillo Alderete (9 June 1636 – 1 July 1641)
- Antonio Valdés Herrera (21 October 1641 – 10 November 1653)
- Juan de Palafox y Mendoza (24 November 1653 – 1 October 1659 Died)
- Nicolás Martinez (bishop), O.S.H. (21 June 1660 – 1 Oct 1660 Died)
- Alfonso Enríquez de Santo Tomás, O.P. (26 Sep 1661 – 28 Jan 1664 Confirmed, Bishop of Plasencia)
- Pedro de Godoy, O.P. (31 March 1664 – 16 May 1672 Confirmed, Bishop of Sigüenza)
- Antonio de Isla y Mena (8 August 1672 – 17 Dec 1681 Died)
- Sebastián de Arévalo y Torres, Order of Friars Minor (O.F.M.) (20 April 1682 – 20 Jan 1704 Died)
- Jorge Cárdenas Valenzuela (1704 – 18 November 1705 Died)
- Andrés Soto de la Fuente (22 March 1706 – 29 December 1714 Died)
- Felipe Antonio Gil Taboada (5 July 1715 – 4 March 1720)
- Miguel Herrero Esgueva (15 April 1720 – 20 January 1723)
- Jacinto Valledor Fresno (12 April 1723 – 12 February 1730 Died)
- José Barnuevo, O.S.B. (24 July 1730 – 25 July 1735 Died)
- Pedro de la Cuadra Achica (1 April 1736 – 7 September 1741)
- Juan Antonio Oruña (28 September 1744 – 4 March 1748 Died)
- Pedro Clemente de Aróstegui (16 September 1747 – 29 August 1760)
- Jacinto Aguado y Chacón (18 July 1762 – 27 March 1764)
- Bernardo Antonio Calderón Lázaro (20 August 1764 – 15 October 1786)
- Joaquín de Eleta, O.F.M. (27 December 1786 – 4 December 1788 Died)
- José Constancio Andino (29 March 1790 – death Nov 1793)
- Diego Melo Portugal, Order of Saint Augustine (O.S.A.) (12 September 1794 – 18 December 1795)
- Antonio Tavira Almazán (27 June 1796 – 14 August 1798)
- Francisco Ignacio Iñigo Angulo (25 September 1798 – 8 January 1799)
- Juan Moya, O.F.M. (28 March 1799 – 19 February 1801)
- José Antonio Garnica, Capuchin Franciscans (O.F.M. Cap.) (23 February 1801 – 10 January 1810)
- Juan Cavia González (19 August 1814 – 23 December 1831)
- Gregorio Sánchez y Jiménez (Rubio), Hieronymites (O.S.H.) (17 December 1847 – 27 September 1852)
- Vicente Horcos y San Martín, Benedictine Order (O.S.B.) (27 September 1852 – 13 January 1861)
- Pedro María Lagüera y Menezo (23 December 1861 – 1892)
- Victoriano Guisasola y Menéndez (15 June 1893 – 19 April 1897)
- José María García Escudero y Ubago (19 April 1897 – 22 March 1909)
- Manuel Lago y González (25 August 1909 – 4 May 1917)
- Matteo Múgica y Urrestarazu (22 February 1918 – 26 October 1923)
- Miguel de los Santos Díaz y Gómara (18 December 1924 – 28 January 1935)
- Tomás Gutiérrez Diez (1 April 1935 – 11 November 1943)
- Saturnino Rubio y Montiél (9 December 1944 – 1959 see below)

Suffragan Bishops of Osma-Soria

- Saturnino Rubio y Montiél (see above 1959 – 4 December 1969)
- Teodoro Cardenal Fernández (1 December 1969 – 19 October 1983)
- José Diéguez Reboredo (1 September 1984 – 15 May 1987)
- Braulio Rodríguez Plaza (6 November 1987 – 12 May 1995)
- Francisco Pérez González (16 December 1995 – 30 October 2003)
- Vicente Jiménez Zamora (21 May 2004 – 27 July 2007)
- Gerardo Melgar Viciosa (1 May 2008 – 8 April 2016)
- Abilio Martínez Varea (5 January 2017 – 9 July 2025).

== See also ==
- List of Catholic dioceses in Spain, Andorra, Ceuta and Gibraltar
- Roman Catholicism in Spain

== Sources and external links ==
- GCatholic.org, with Google map and satellite photo – data for all sections ^{[self-published]}
- Catholic Hierarchy ^{[self-published]}
