= Juan Carlos Navarro =

Juan Carlos Navarro is the name of:

- Juan Carlos Navarro (basketball) (born 1980), Spanish professional basketball player
- Juan Carlos Navarro (politician) (born 1961), Panamanian businessman, environmentalist and politician

== See also ==
- Carlos Navarro (disambiguation)
- Juan Navarro (disambiguation)
