= Ciudad Rodrigo Cathedral =

Catholic cathedral in Ciudad Rodrigo, Spain

- Cathedral of Saint Mary
- Catedral de Santa María
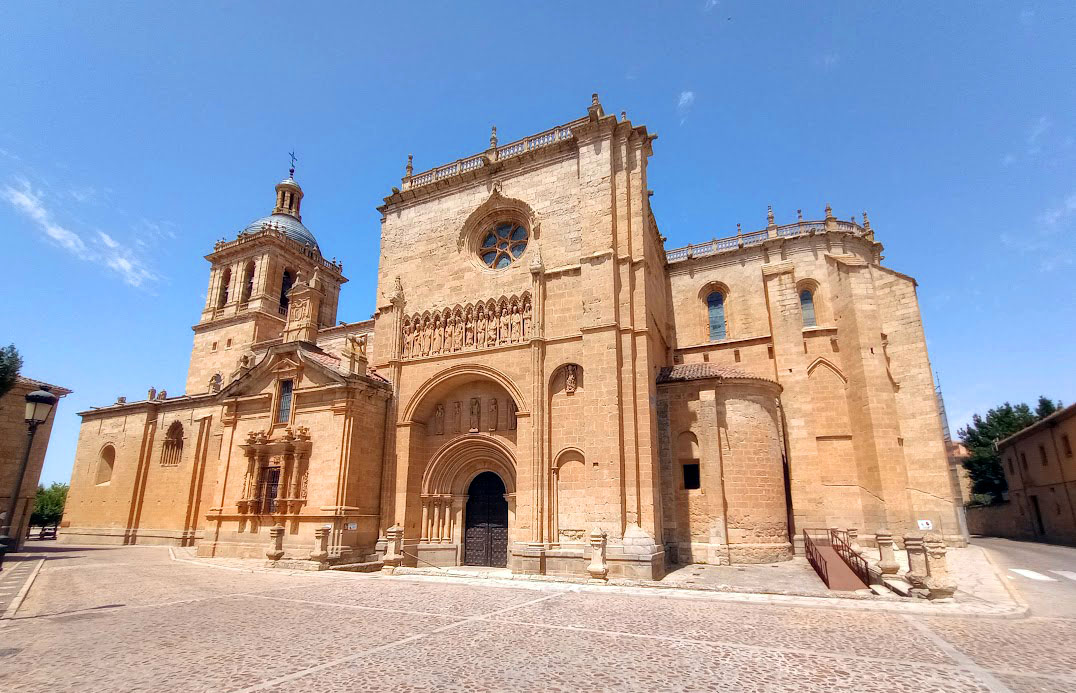
- South façade in 2023.
- Ciudad Rodrigo Cathedral
- 40.598941°N 6.535096°W
- Location: Ciudad Rodrigo
- Address: 4, Plaza de Herrasti
- Country: Spain
- Denomination: Catholic
- Website: catedralciudadrodrigo.com

History
- Status: Cathedral
- Dedication: Mary, Mother of Jesus
- Dedicated: 1160

Architecture
- Style: Late Romanesque, Gothic

Administration
- Metropolis: Valladolid
- Diocese: Ciudad Rodrigo

Clergy
- Bishop: José Luis Retana Gozalo

Spanish Cultural Heritage
- Type: Non-movable
- Criteria: Monument
- Designated: 15 September 1889
- Reference no.: RI-51-0000059

The Cathedral of Saint Mary (Spanish: Catedral de Santa María) is a Roman Catholic cathedral located in Ciudad Rodrigo, Spain. It was declared Bien de Interés Cultural on 15 September 1889.

The Renaissance composers Juan Navarro Hispalensis and his pupil Juan Esquivel Barahona were both choirmasters at the cathedral.

== Architecture ==
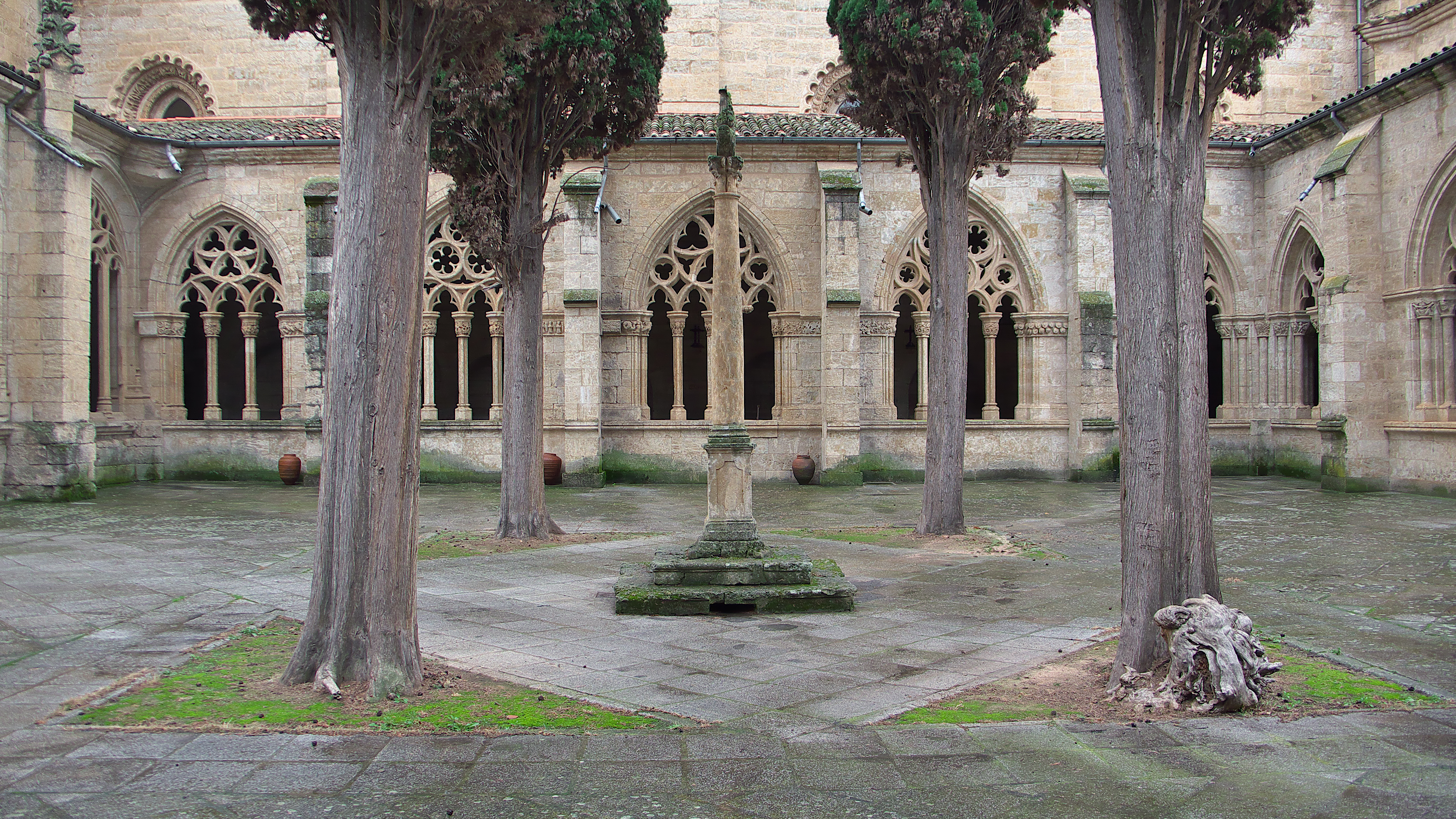
South gallery (14th century)

The cathedral has four doors. In the episciple-side transept, there is a Gothic frieze with twelve figures from the Old Testament and a tympanum in which four Romanesque figures were placed in the Modern Age: from left to right Saint John, Saint Peter, Christ Pantocrator, Saint Paul, and Saint James. In the other transept the Puerta de Amayuelas opens, with a multi-lobed arch.

The tower was raised by Juan de Sagarvinaga at the end of the 18th century in a neoclassical style, after the collapse of the second tower during the Lisbon earthquake (the cathedral had had a third tower, which was demolished after the communal war).

== See also ==
- List of Bien de Interés Cultural in the Province of Salamanca
