= Gil González =

Gil González may refer to:

- Gil González Dávila, 16th-century Spanish Conquistador, discoverer of Nicaragua
- Gil González Dávila (historian), 17th-century Spanish biographer and antiquary
