= List of composers who immigrated to Mexico =

Composers who immigrated to Mexico, listed below, span from the colonial period of the Viceroyalty of New Spain to the current republican period.

== Viceroyalty of New Spain ==
- Pedro de Gante (1480–1572)
- Hernando Franco (1532–1585)
- Juan Navarro Gaditanus (c. 1550 – c. 1610)
- Juan Gutiérrez de Padilla (ca. 1590 – 1664)
- Antonio de Salazar (c. 1650–1715)

== Republican period ==
- Rodolfo Halffter (1900–1987)

== See also ==
- List of Mexican composers of classical music
