= Juan Navarro =

Juan Navarro is the name of:

- Juan Navarro Hispalensis (1530–1580), composer
- Juan Navarro Gaditanus (c. 1550 – c. 1610), Franciscan friar and composer
- Juan Navarro Reverter (1844–1924), Spanish politician
- Juan Gil Navarro (born 1973), Argentinian TV actor
- Juan Carlos Navarro (basketball) (born 1980), nicknamed "La Bomba" (The Bomb)
- Juan Fernández Sánchez Navarro (born 1977), Mexican politician

== See also ==
- Juan Navarro High School, Austin, Texas, US
