= Fernando Rodríguez de Castro (died 1304) =

Galician noble (??–1304)

- Died: 1304
- Noble family: House of Castro
- Spouse: Violante Sánchez of Castile
- Father: Esteban Fernández de Castro
- Mother: Aldonza Rodriguez de León

Fernando Rodríguez de Castro (died 1304), was a Galician noble and a member of the House of Castro. He was the son of Esteban Fernández de Castro, Lord of Lemos and Sarria, and Aldonza Rodríguez de León. His paternal grandparents were Fernando Gutiérrez de Castro and Emilia Iniguez de Mendoza. His maternal grandparents were Rodrigo Alfonso de León, son of Alfonso IX of León, and Ines Rodríguez Cabrera.

Following the death of his father, Esteban Fernández de Castro, Fernando became Lord of Lemos and Sarria. In 1293, he married Violante Sánchez of Castile, illegitimate daughter of Sancho IV of Castile. He was one of the most powerful and influential nobles of Galicia, like most members of the House of Castro.

In 1304, Fernando took up arms against Ferdinand IV of Castile, by attacking Philip of Castile, who was in Galicia besieging the fortress of Monforte de Lemos. Fernando's advisers tried to persuade him to reach a peace agreement with the Felipe, who was brother of Violente Sánchez of Castile, his wife. However, no agreement was reached and Fernando Rodriguez de Castro was killed in the ensuing battle.

== Marriage and offspring ==
He married Violante Sánchez of Castile, illegitimate daughter of Sancho IV of Castile and María de Meneses. They had two children:

- Pedro Fernández de Castro "the War" (died 1342). Lord of Lemos and Sarria. Died of an epidemic during the Siege of Algeciras and was buried in the Cathedral of Santiago de Compostela.
- Juana Fernández de Castro, married Alfonso de Castilla y Aleramici, grandson of Alfonso X of Castile.
