= List of Bienes de Interés Cultural in the Province of Salamanca =

This is a list of Bien de Interés Cultural landmarks in the Province of Salamanca, Spain.

- Church of Sancti Spiritus
- Cathedral of Santa María (Ciudad Rodrigo)
