= Church of Sancti Spiritus =

- Iglesia de Sancti Spiritus (Spanish)
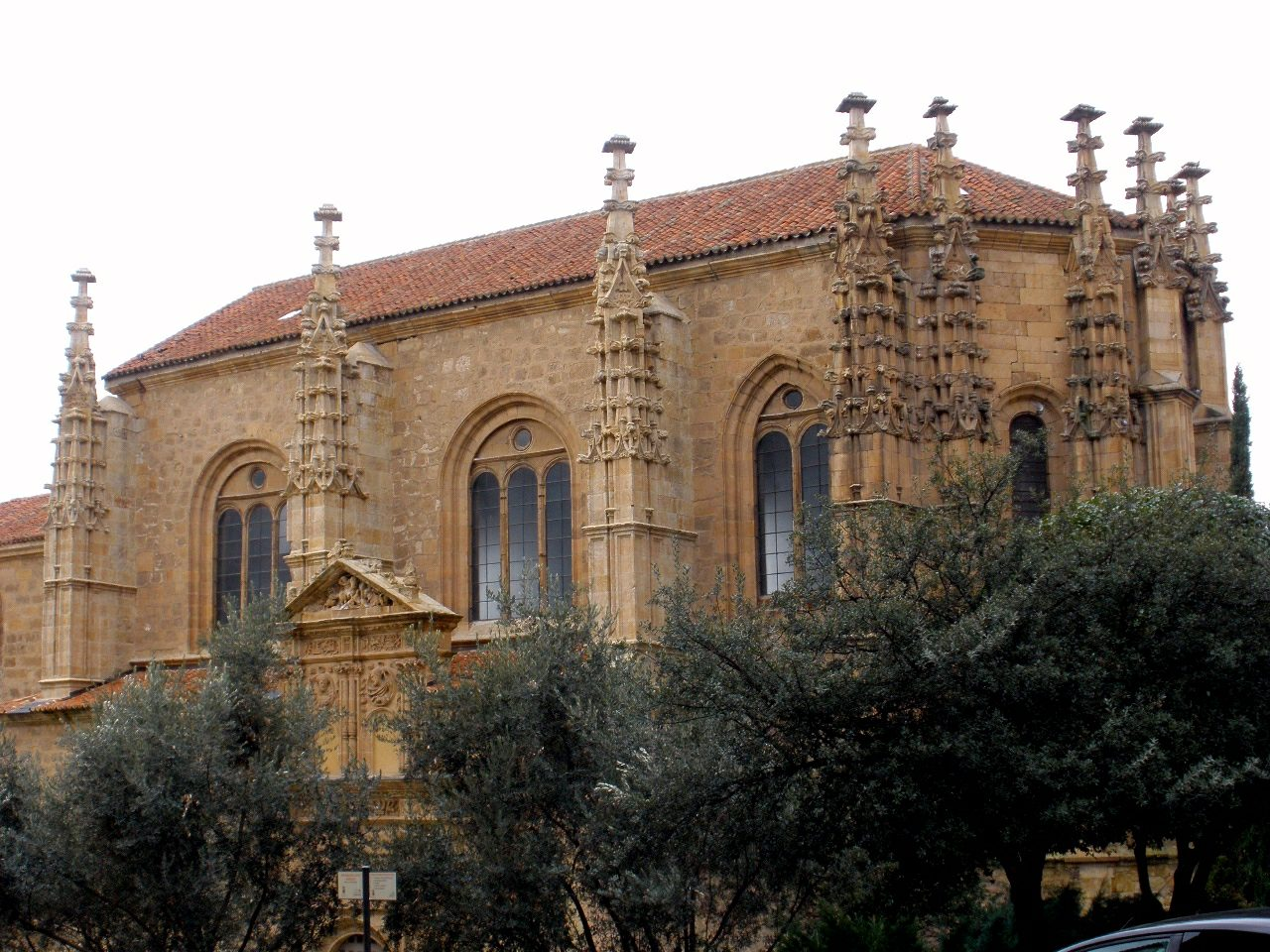

- Location within Spain
- 40.965354°N 5.659242°W
- Location: Salamanca, Spain

Spanish Cultural Heritage
- Official name: Iglesia de Sancti Spiritus
- Type: Non-movable
- Criteria: Monument
- Designated: 1888
- Reference no.: RI-51-0000055

The Church of Sancti Spiritus (Spanish: Iglesia de Sancti Spiritus) is a church located in Salamanca, Spain. It was declared Bien de Interés Cultural in 1888.

== History ==
The convent was founded in 1268 by Martín Alfonso, illegitimate son of Alfonso IX of León and Teresa Gil de Soverosa, and his wife, María Méndez de Sousa, who in turn ceded it to the Order of Santiago in 1269.

This convent or monastery was one of the two most outstanding hospital foundations that the Order of Santiago owned in the kingdom of León, followed by the town and castle of Castrotorafe, a depopulated municipality located in the current province of Zamora.

The patronage of the monastery was exercised between 1268 and 1379 by four women, the first being María Méndez de Sousa, founder of the monastery. The other three were Queen María de Molina, Violante Sánchez de Castilla and Queen Juana Manuel de Villena, wife of Henry II of Castile and daughter of the famous magnate Don Juan Manuel. Although the kings of Castile did not donate any possessions to the monastery, they confirmed its privileges on several occasions and protected it during its conflicts with the Order of Santiago or with the council of the city of Salamanca.

The convent of Santa Ana welcomed the wives of the knights from Salamanca who were leaving for war, which is why the nuns adopted the name of Commanders. The convent's affiliation with the Order of Santiago led to it being called Comendadoras de Santiago.

After the Spanish Confiscation, which began in 1836, the convent was transformed into a prison. Over time it would come to house other services (municipal police, etc.). In 1965 it was completely demolished and a building for housing was later built on the site and a new street called Rondín de Santi-Spiritus was opened between the chapel of the Santísimo Cristo de los Milagros and the new building.

== Building ==
The church was restored in the mid-16th century, combining the Gothic structure with Plateresque decoration. Inside, the choir and the chapel stand out with a Mudejar coffered ceiling from the 15th and 16th centuries; the Cristo de los Milagro (Christ of Miracles, from the 14th century; the main altarpiece, the work of Antonio de Paz. The tombs of Martín Alfonso de León and María Méndez de Sousa are located in the presbytery and very poorly preserved.

On the outside, the Renaissance façade stands out with an important sculptural decoration in which the six triumphs of Petrarch are illustrated. Medallions with the busts of Saint Peter and Saint Paul and a scene of Santiago in the battle of Clavijo can also be found on the exterior. The nuns maintained that the Apostle Santiago promised to give victory to the Christians in battle if the first of the Christians to die in battle donated his property to the convent.

=== Royal Tombs ===
Three members of the Leonese and Castilian royalty were buried in the church between the 13th and 14th centuries:

- Martín Alfonso de León, illegitimate son of King Alfonso IX of León.
- María Méndez de Sousa, wife of the former and daughter of Mendo González de Sousa and Teresa Alfonso Téllez de Meneses.
- Violante Sánchez de Castilla, illegitimate daughter of Sancho IV of Castile and María de Meneses.

== See also ==
- List of Bien de Interés Cultural in the Province of Salamanca
- Iglesia de Sancti Spiritus (Salamanca)
