= Carlos Navarro =

Carlos Navarro may refer to:

- Carlos Navarro (footballer) (born 2004), Spanish footballer
- Carlos Navarro (taekwondo) (born 1996), Mexican taekwondo practitioner
- Carlos Navarro Montoya (born 1966), Colombian footballer
- Carlos Arias Navarro (1908–1989), Spanish politician
- Carlos Navarro (Mexican actor) (1921–1969), Mexican film and television actor
- Carlos Navarro (American actor) (born 1980), American actor and radio personality

== See also ==
- Juan Carlos Navarro (disambiguation)
