= Gutierre Fernández (composer) =

Gutierre Fernández, sometimes given as Gutierre Fernández Hidalgo (c. 1547 – June 11, 1623), was a South American composer and Roman Catholic priest of Spanish birth. His only surviving works are sacred vocal works; most of which were composed for vespers.

== Life and career ==
Gutierre Fernández was born in Talavera de la Reina, Spain in c. 1547. He was trained by Juan Navarro and worked as a musician under Navarro at the New Cathedral of Salamanca until Navarro was fired in 1574. Fernández also left the cathedral at this time and took a post as maestro de capilla at the Church of Santa María la Mayor in Talavera de la Reina He remained there for approximately nine years.

In late 1583 Fernández left his post in Talavera de la Reina to travel to the New World to assume the post of maestro de capilla at the Catedral Primada de Colombia in Santafe (now Bogotá). He concurrently served as rector of the Major Seminary of Bogotá. He left those posts in 1586 to assume a similar position at the cathedral in at Quito. He stayed in that post until he was appointed maestro de capilla at both the cathedral in Lima and the Royal Monastery of La Encarnación. In 1587 he was appointed maestro de capilla of the Cuzco Cathedral. From 1612 until his death he was the head priest at San Lazaro Church in Sucre (then called La Plata).

Gutierre Fernández died in La Plata on June 11, 1623.
