= Traspinedo =

Coordinates: 41°35′N 4°28′W

Traspinedo, Spain
- Coat of arms

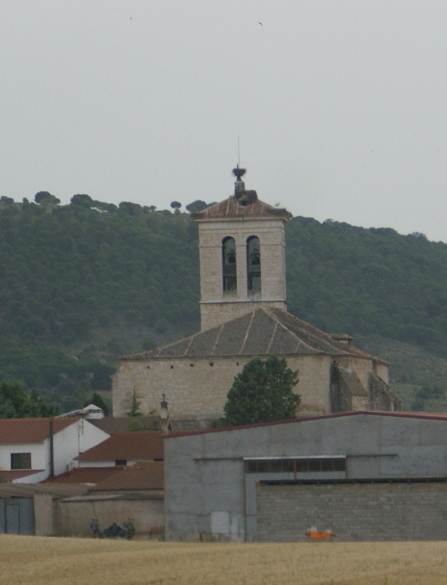
- Country: Spain
- Autonomous community: Castile and León
- Province: Valladolid
- Municipality: Traspinedo

Area
  - Total: 26.43 km^{2} (10.20 sq mi)

Population (2025-01-01)
  - Total: 1,308
  - Density: 49.49/km^{2} (128.2/sq mi)
- Time zone: UTC+1 (CET)
  - Summer (DST): UTC+2 (CEST)

Traspinedo is a municipality located in the province of Valladolid, Castile and León, Spain. According to the 2004 census (INE), the municipality has a population of 905 inhabitants.
