= Juan Navarro Hispalensis =

Spanish composer

Juan Navarro of Seville, hence the epithet Hispalensis, (Marchena c. 1530 – Palencia 25 September 1580) was a Spanish composer. He is not related to the Mexican composer Juan Navarro Gaditanus, (i.e. Juan Navarro of Cadiz, c. 1550 – c. 1610).

== Biography ==
Navarro gave his place of birth as Marchena when inducted as chapel-master at Ciudad Rodrigo. Marchena is some 30 miles (50km) from Seville, but in its province and geographically near enough to justify the epithet Hispalensis, which appears on the title page of his 1590 Roman publication (below). Navarro sang as a tenor in the choir of the Duke of Arcos in Marchena (by 1549, when Cristóbal de Morales was chapel-master), then in the cathedrals of Jaén and Málaga. In 1553 he competed for the position of maestro de capilla in Málaga left vacant by the death of Morales, a competition won by Francisco Guerrero. In 1563 he was appointed maestro de capilla of the Cathedral of Avila, then in 1566 of Salamanca where he was appointed without being required to compete for the post. Avila offered to double his salary to keep him, but the position at Salamanca was more attractive. At Salamanca he taught composer Gutierre Fernández. He left Salamanca after striking the chaplain and succentor, Juan Sanchez, in the face during Vespers on New Year's Eve 1573, and became chapel-master in 1574 at Ciudad Rodrigo and then Palencia in 1578, where he remained till his death and where he was buried.

Navarro's compositions include two hymn cycles, one written in Avila (1565) and preserved in manuscript there, the second published posthumously in Rome (1590) as part of the 350-page collection of "Psalmi, Hymni ac Magnificat totius anni ... , for four, five, and six voices." This contained 12 vesper psalms, 18 vesper hymns, and a set of Magnificats in each of the eight tones (plus a ninth setting), plus 4 Marian antiphons - a formula closely following that of Guerrero's similar 1584 Liber vesperarum. The only works printed in his lifetime were a villancico and two villanescas, in Daza's 1576 El Parnaso.

His works include a number of motets preserved in manuscript, but no mass settings. Some of his works are based on uniquely Spanish chant melodies rather than the Roman melodies more commonly used by Renaissance composers. These comprise two settings of hymns ("Vexilla regis" and "Pange lingua"), two settings of antiphons ("Regina caeli" and "Ave Regina caelorum") and a "Te Deum".

== Works ==
- Psalmi, hymni, ac Magnificat totius anni, secundum ritum Sanctae Romanae Ecclesiae, quatuor, quinque, ac sex vocibus concinendi, Rome 1590 (posthumous)
- Free scores by Juan Navarro Hispalensis in the Choral Public Domain Library (ChoralWiki)
