= Ciudad Rodrigo =

- municipality
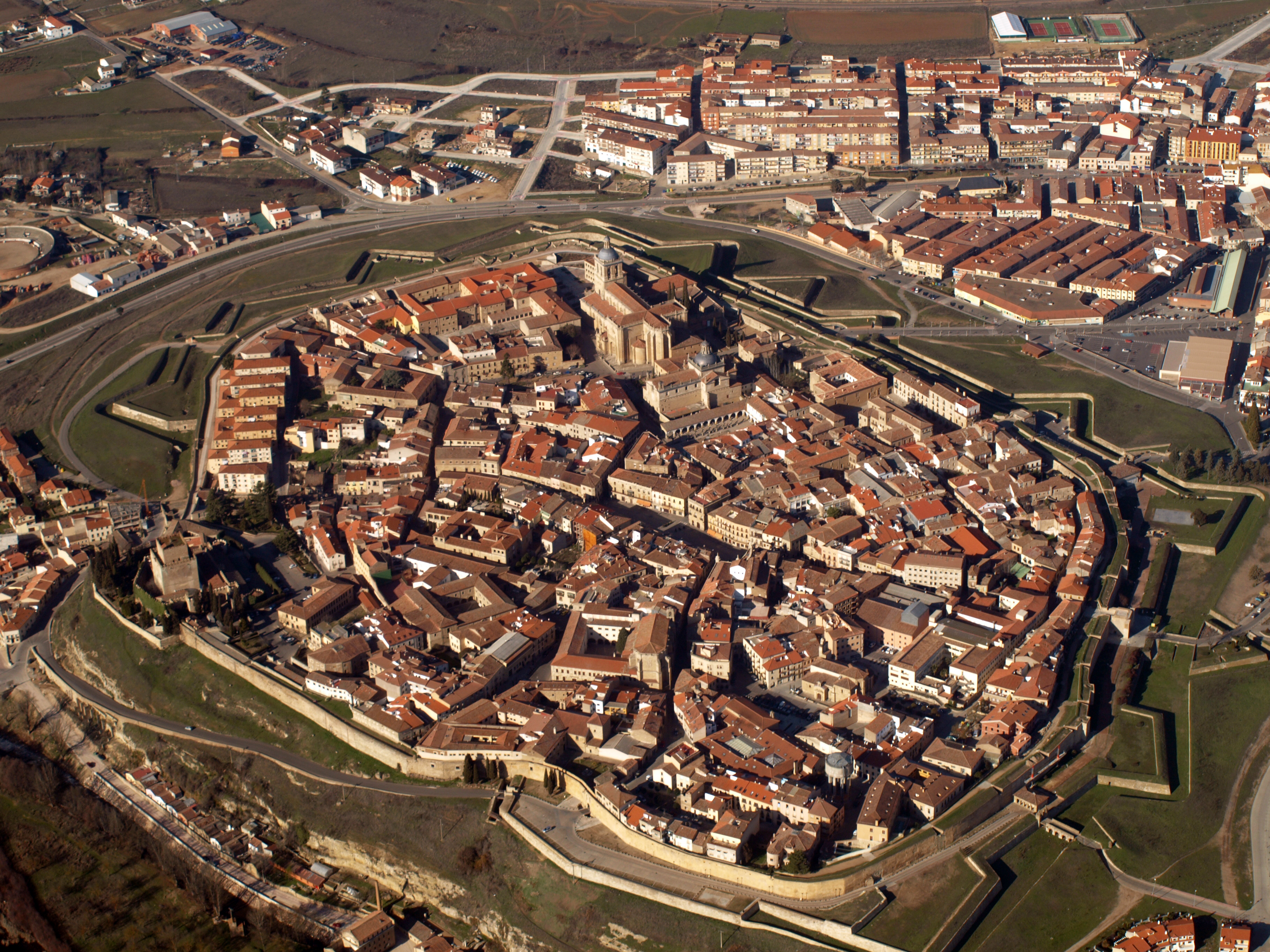

- Flag Coat of arms

- Location in Salamanca

- Location in Spain Ciudad Rodrigo (Spain)
- Coordinates: 40°35′49″N 6°32′21″W
- Country: Spain
- Autonomous community: Castile and León
- Province: Salamanca
- Comarca: Comarca of Ciudad Rodrigo

Government
  - Mayor: Marcos Iglesias Caridad (PP)

Area
  - Total: 240 km^{2} (93 sq mi)
- Elevation: 658 m (2,159 ft)

Population (2025-01-01)
  - Total: 11,750
  - Density: 49/km^{2} (130/sq mi)
- Time zone: UTC+1 (CET)
  - Summer (DST): UTC+2 (CEST)
- Postal code: 37500
- Website: www.aytociudadrodrigo.es

Ciudad Rodrigo (Spanish: [θjuˈðað roˈðɾiɣo]) is a small cathedral city in the province of Salamanca, in western Spain, with a population in 2016 of 12,896. It is also the seat of a judicial district.

The site of Ciudad Rodrigo, perched atop a rocky rise on the right bank of the River Águeda, has been occupied since the Neolithic Age. Known also as Mirobriga by those who wish to associate the city with an ancient Celtic village in the outskirts of the modern city.

A key border fortress between Spain and Portugal, it was the site of a 10-day siege by the Duke of Wellington during the Peninsular War.

== Geography ==
Ciudad Rodrigo is situated on the right bank of the Águeda river, about 89 km (55 mi) south-west of Salamanca and 25 km (16 mi) away from the Portuguese border.

The autovia A-62 (dual carriageway) links Ciudad Rodrigo with Salamanca, Valladolid and Burgos, and with Portugal.

=== Climate ===
At an elevation of 658 metres (2,159 ft) Ciudad Rodrigo has an inland Mediterranean climate (Köppen: Csb) characterised by cool, damp winters and warm, dry summers with relatively cool nights during the summer.

Climate data for Ciudad Rodrigo, Spain
Month	Jan	Feb	Mar	Apr	May	Jun	Jul	Aug	Sep	Oct	Nov	Dec	Year
Mean daily maximum °C (°F)	9.6 (49.3)	11.9 (53.4)	15.4 (59.7)	16.6 (61.9)	20.6 (69.1)	26.6 (79.9)	30.5 (86.9)	30.3 (86.5)	26.0 (78.8)	19.2 (66.6)	13.4 (56.1)	10.0 (50.0)	19.2 (66.5)
Daily mean °C (°F)	4.9 (40.8)	6.3 (43.3)	9.1 (48.4)	10.5 (50.9)	14.0 (57.2)	18.8 (65.8)	21.9 (71.4)	21.8 (71.2)	18.4 (65.1)	13.3 (55.9)	8.4 (47.1)	5.7 (42.3)	12.8 (55.0)
Mean daily minimum °C (°F)	0.1 (32.2)	0.7 (33.3)	2.7 (36.9)	4.4 (39.9)	7.3 (45.1)	11.0 (51.8)	13.2 (55.8)	13.2 (55.8)	10.8 (51.4)	7.4 (45.3)	3.4 (38.1)	1.3 (34.3)	6.3 (43.3)
Average rainfall mm (inches)	42.9 (1.69)	32.3 (1.27)	27.7 (1.09)	42.6 (1.68)	53.7 (2.11)	19.7 (0.78)	10.0 (0.39)	11.9 (0.47)	32.8 (1.29)	64.2 (2.53)	61.3 (2.41)	56.1 (2.21)	455.2 (17.92)
Source: World Meteorological Organization

== History ==
=== Origins ===
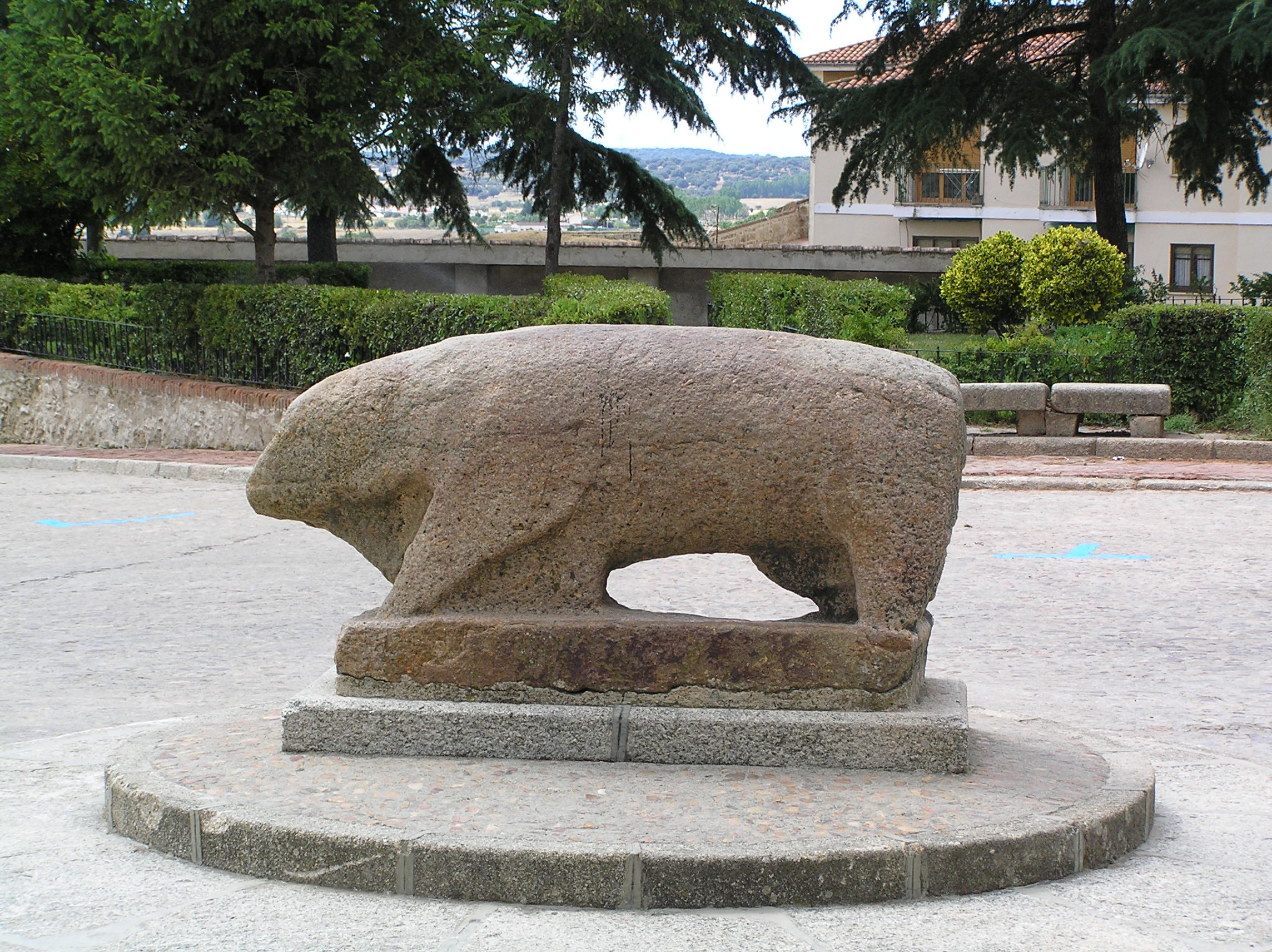
A verraco in Ciudad Rodrigo, built by the Vettones.

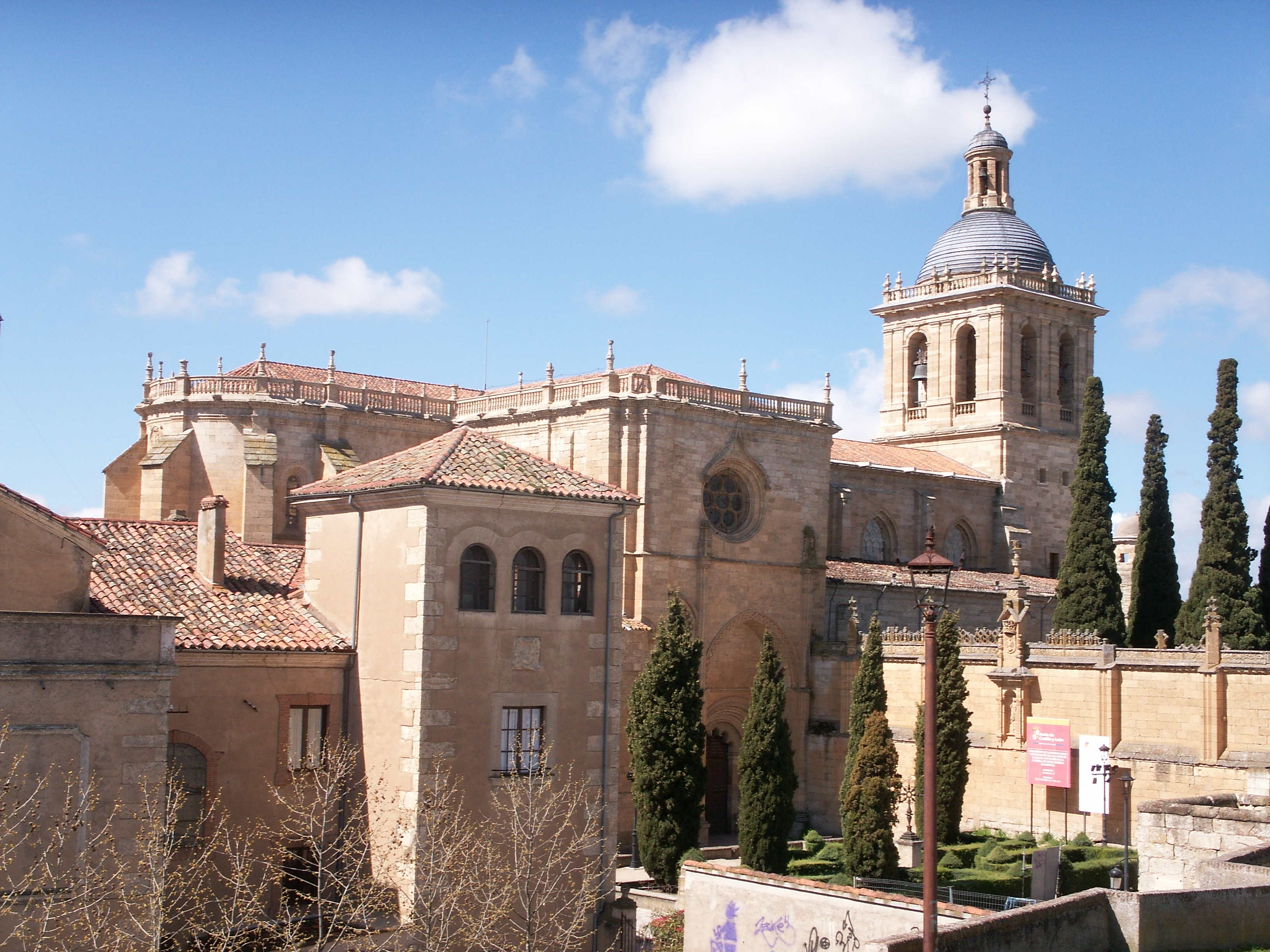
The Cathedral of Ciudad Rodrigo, was built between the 12th and 14th centuries.

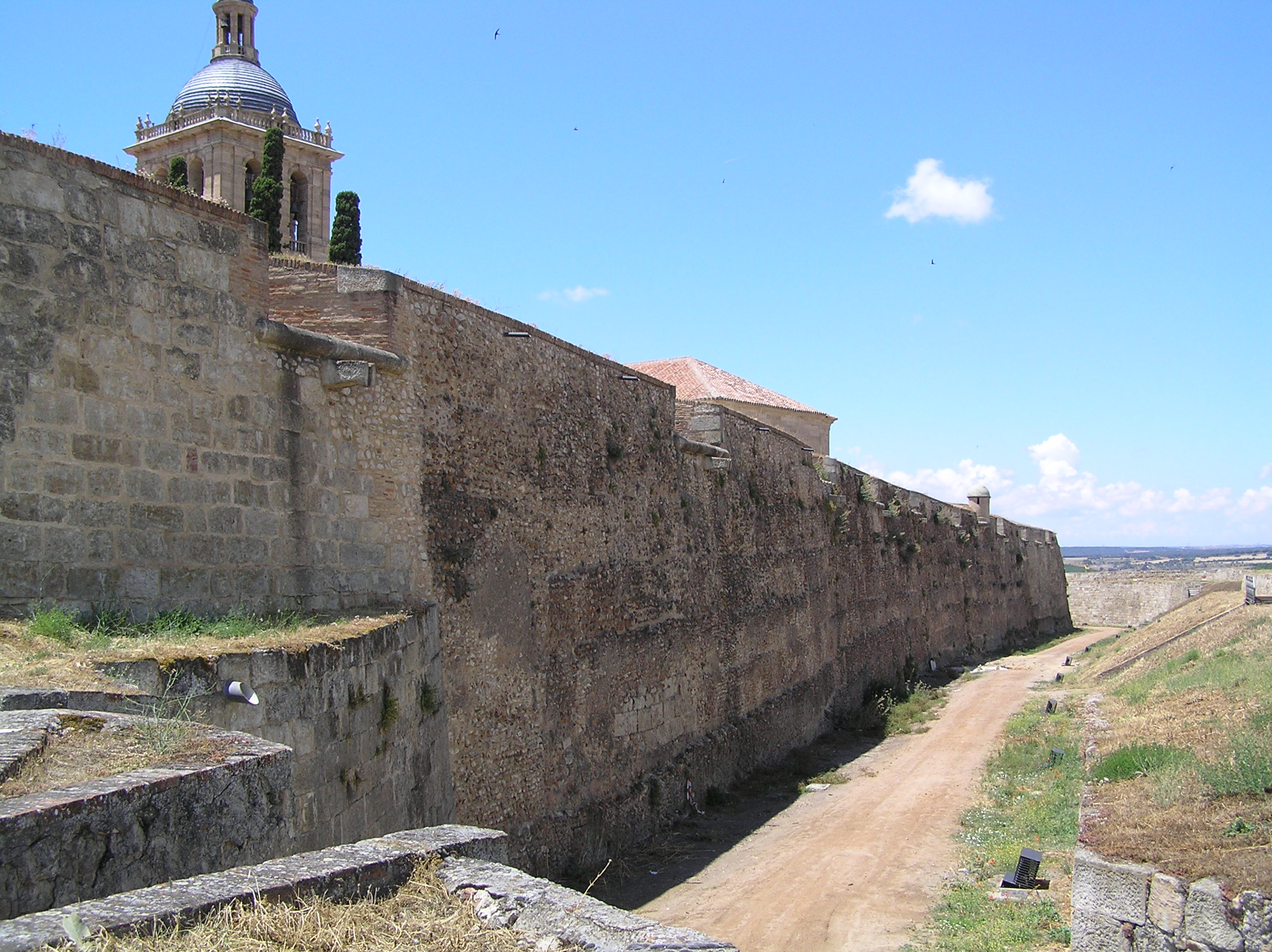
The City Walls, built by Ferdinand II of León in the 12th century.

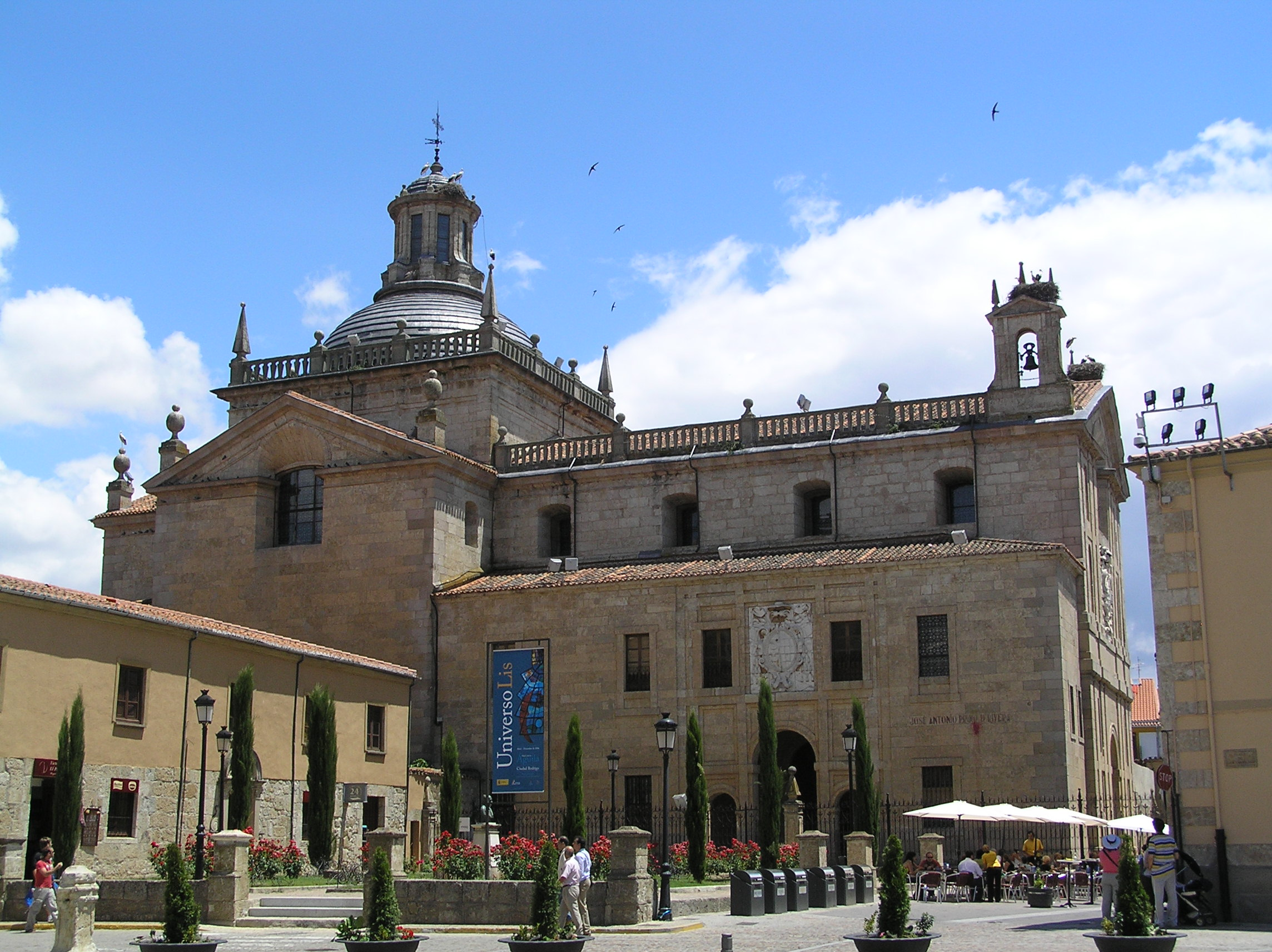
Facade of Capilla de Cerralbo, built between the 16th and 17th centuries.

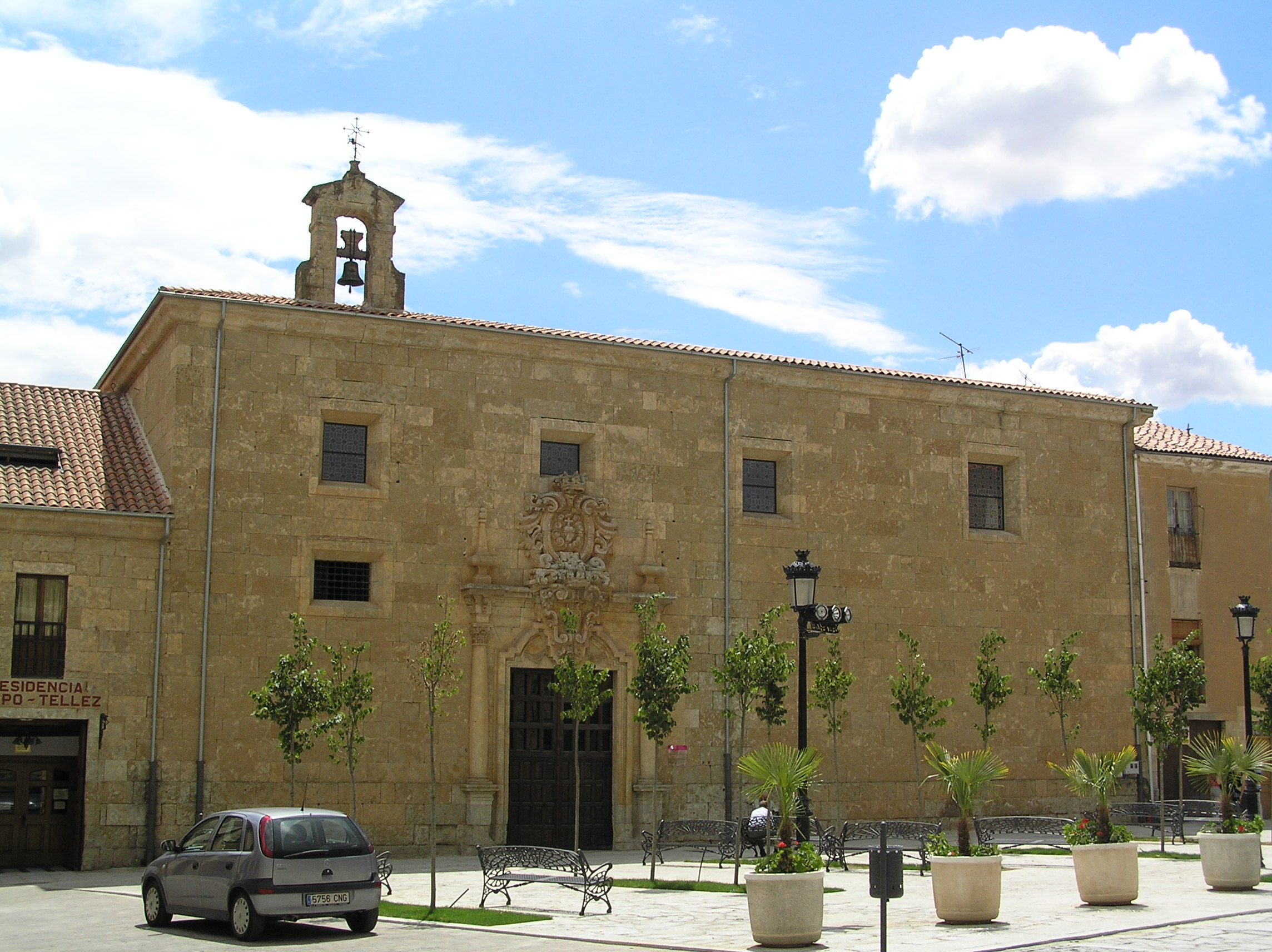
Capilla de las Franciscanas Descalzas (built in 1739).

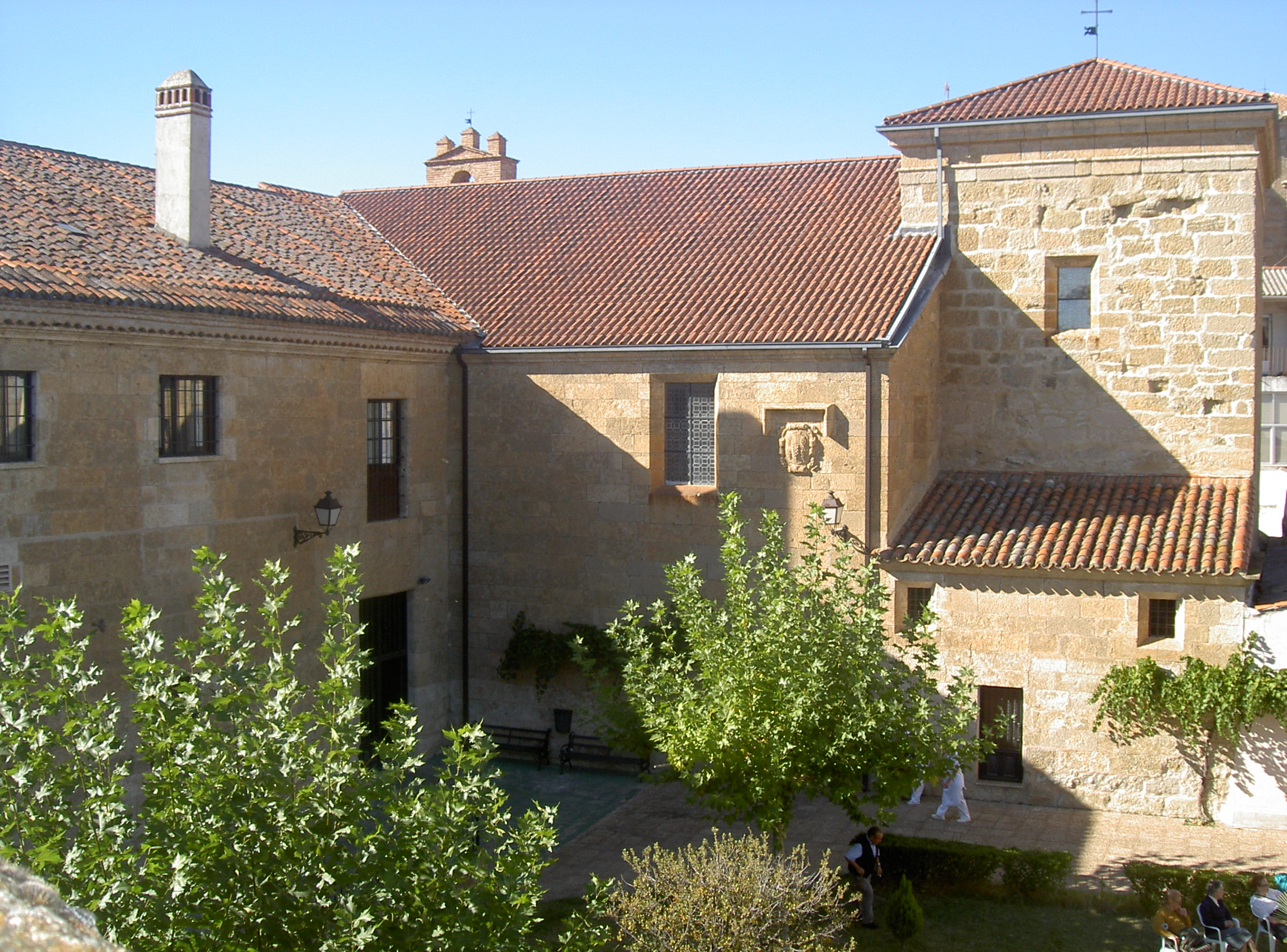
The Hospital of the Passion, built in the 15th century.

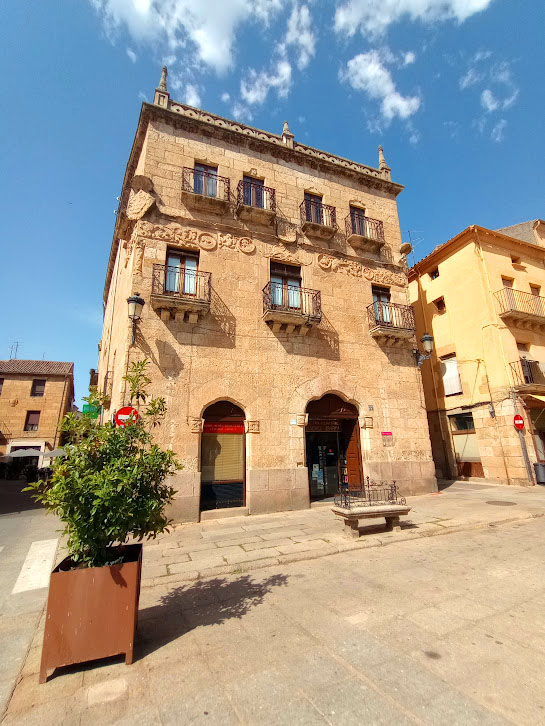
Casa del Primer Marqués de Cerralbo (16th century).

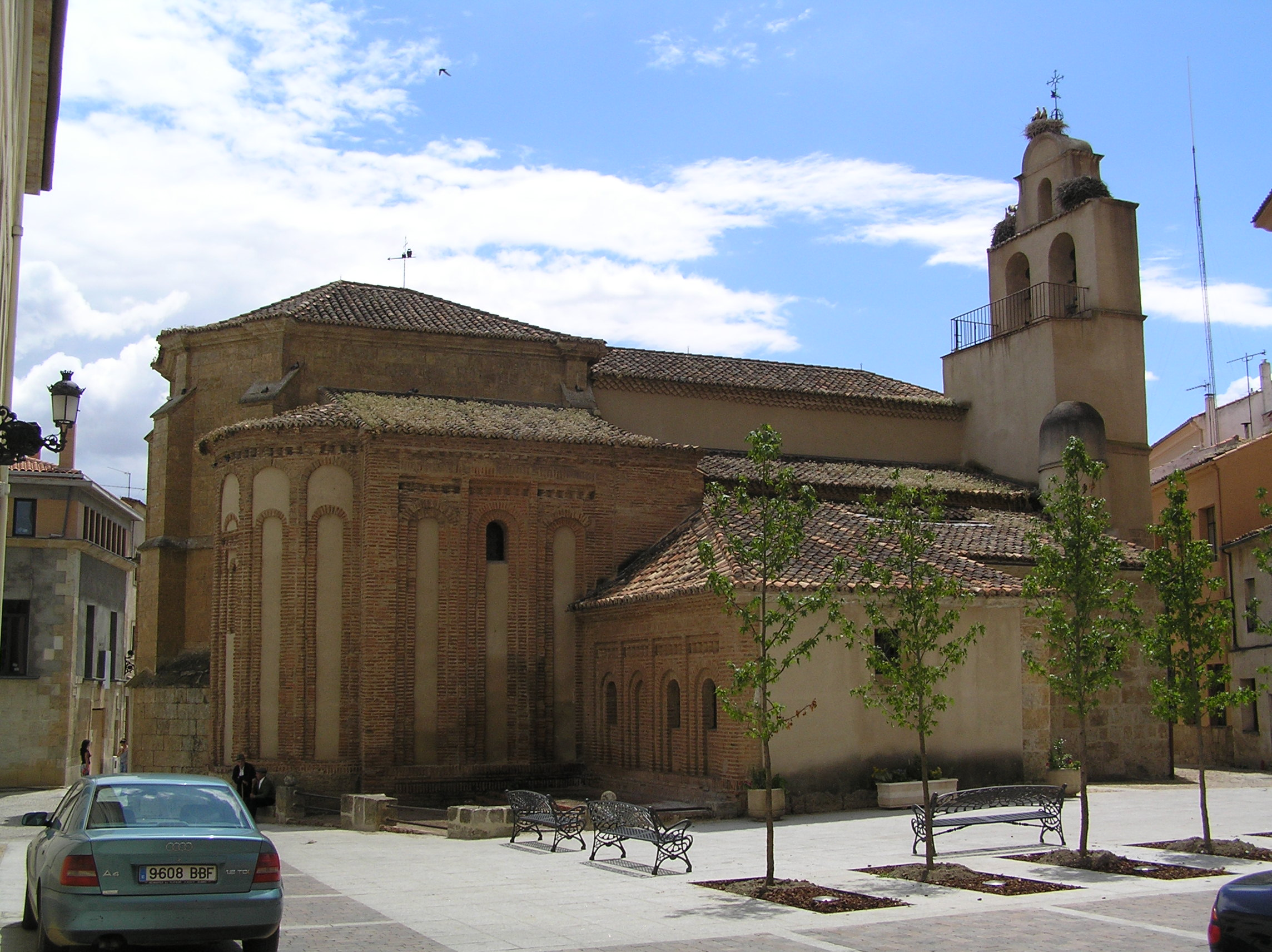
San Isidoro Church (12th century).

Ciudad Rodrigo was originally a Celtic village under the name of Mirobriga. The town was later taken by the Romans during the conquest of Lusitania and named Augustobriga.

In the 12th century, the site was repopulated by King Ferdinand II of León, walling it and re-establishing the old Visigothic diocese of Calabria into the new bishopric as suffragan of the Diocese of Santiago de Compostela; it comprised a big part of the province of Salamanca, and a portion of the province of Cáceres, an act confirmed by Pope Alexander III in 1175. This led to the construction of the city's cathedral, an architectural hybrid of the Gothic and late Romanesque styles. King Alfonso VIII gave the city of Calabria to the Diocese of Ciudad Rodrigo in 1191. The first bishop of whom anything certain is known was called Pedro (1165) and one of the most celebrated was the learned jurist Don Diego de Covarruvias y Leyva (1560).

In the Middle Ages, Ciudad Rodrigo had a Jewish community with its own synagogue. The community retained the right to use the building until late July 1492, shortly before the expulsion, when it was transferred to the local Confraternity of the Passion. The town also served as a crossing point for Jewish exiles from Castile on their way into neighboring Portugal.

=== Artistic works ===
During the 15th century, a series of artworks of perhaps 35-panels (only 26 panels survive), known as the Retablo (altarpiece) of the Cathedral of the Ciudad Rodrigo was created by Fernando Gallego, Maestro Bartolomé, and the artists of their workshops. Over the centuries, the works became badly deteriorated. In 1954, they were acquired by the Samuel H. Kress Foundation which had them fully restored. In 1961, the foundation donated the works to the University of Arizona Museum of Art in Tucson, Arizona, where they reside today.

=== Napoleonic Wars ===
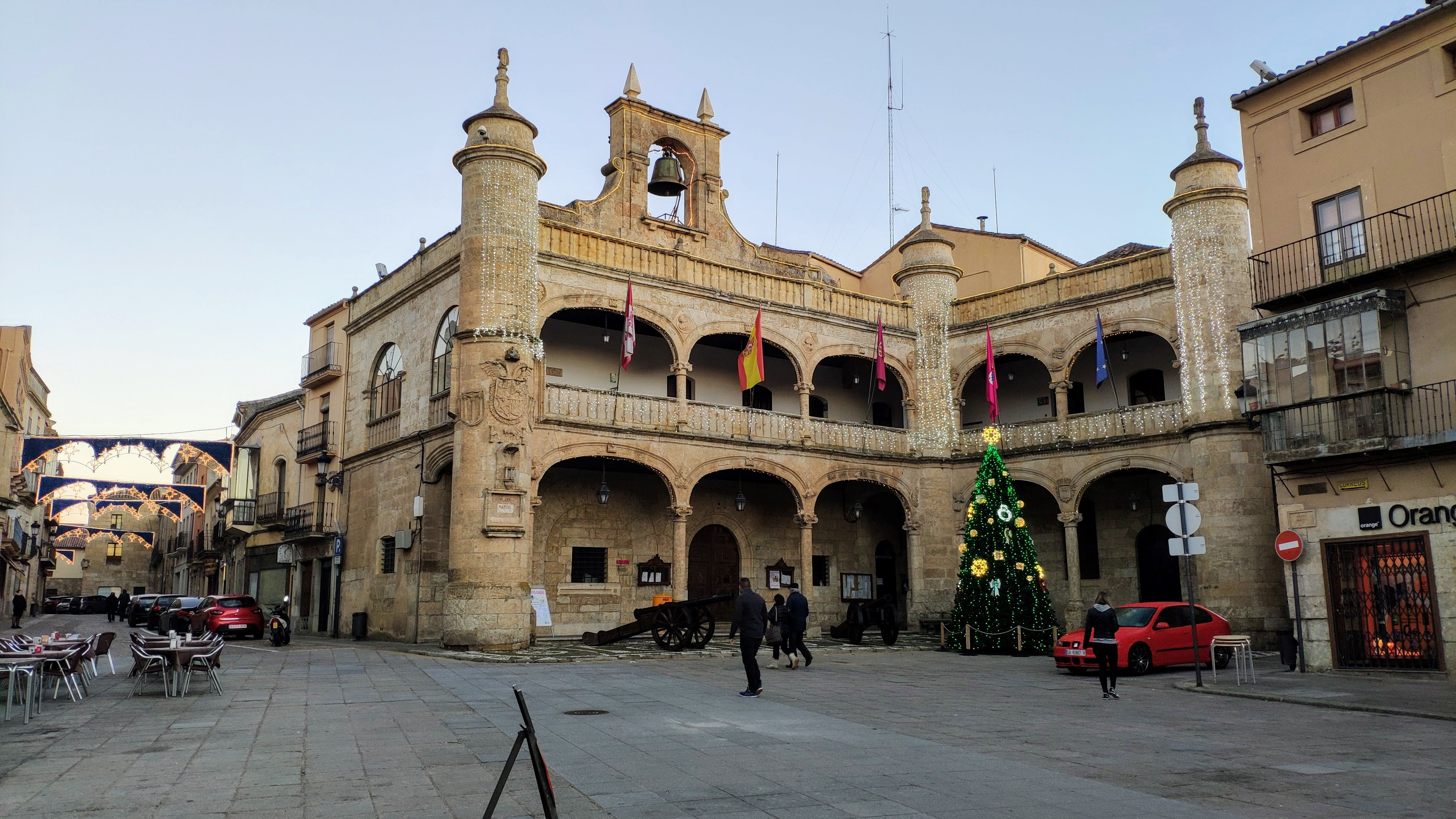
The Ayuntamiento of Ciudad Rodrigo (16th century).

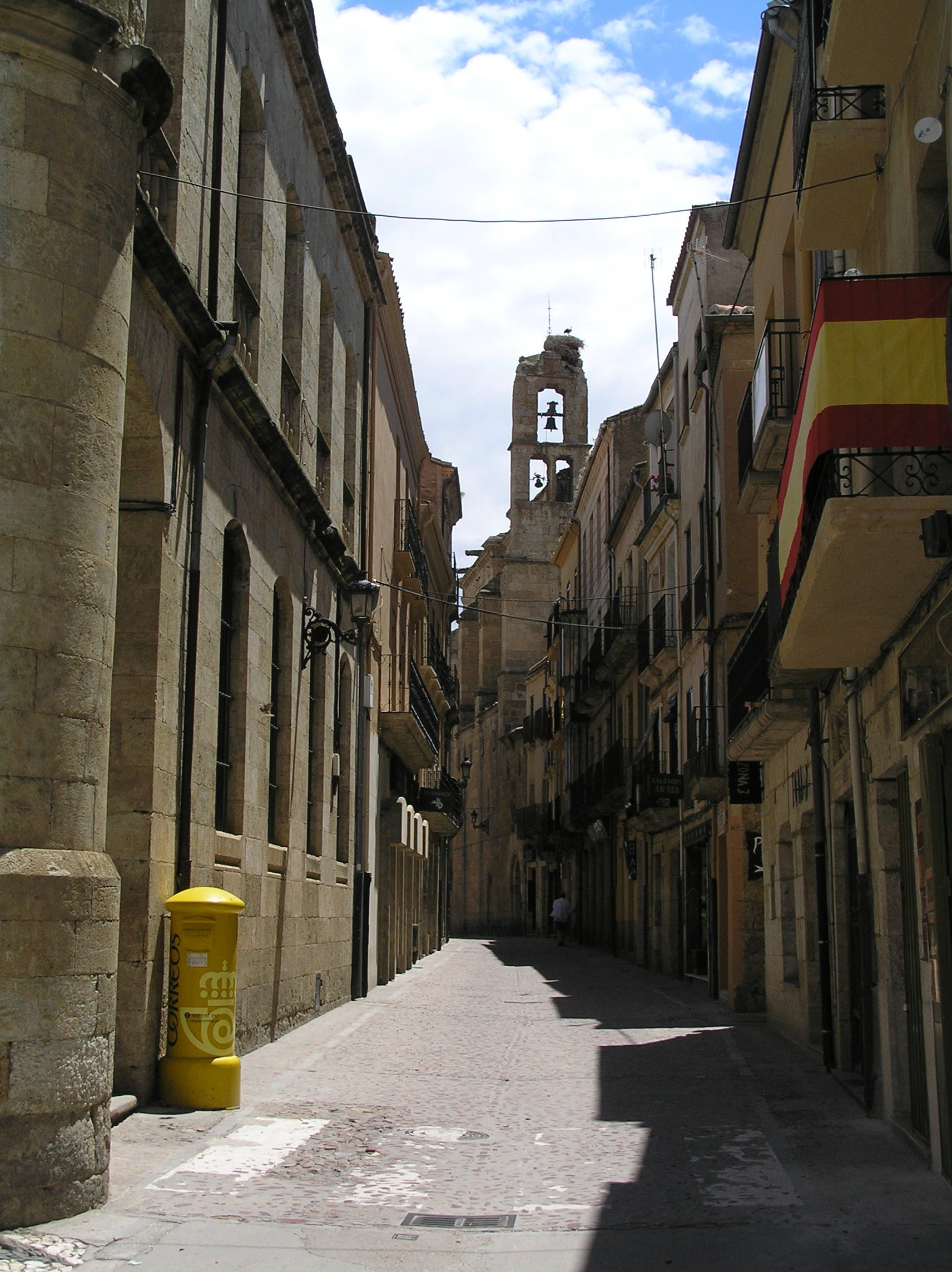
A street of the city.

Main articles: Siege of Ciudad Rodrigo (1810) and Siege of Ciudad Rodrigo (1812)

Its position as a fortified town on the main road from Portugal to Salamanca made it militarily important in the middle years of the Napoleonic Peninsular War.

The French Marshal Michel Ney took Ciudad Rodrigo on 9 July 1810 after a 24-day siege. The 5,500-man Spanish garrison of Field Marshal Don Andreas de Herrasti put up a gallant defense, surrendering only after French artillery opened a breach in the walls and their infantry were poised for an assault. The Spanish suffered 461 killed and 994 wounded, while 4,000 men and 118 cannon were captured. Ney's VI Corps lost 180 killed and over 1,000 wounded during the siege. The French soldiery then pillaged the city. The siege delayed Marshal André Masséna's invasion of Portugal by a month.

The British General Wellington began his 1812 campaign by taking Ciudad Rodrigo by storm on the night of 19–20 January 1812, after preparatory operations lasting about 10 days. In these clashes, the British captured the Greater Teson on 8 January and the Lesser Teson on 16 January. Meanwhile, two breaches in the walls had been opened by Wellington's twenty-three 24-lb and four 18-lb siege guns under the command of Captain Alexander Dickson. Major-General Thomas Picton's 3rd Division assaulted the "greater" breach while Robert Craufurd's Light Division attacked the "lesser" breach. Allied losses in the siege were 195 killed and 916 wounded, although amongst the dead were Maj-Gens Henry Mackinnon and Craufurd. The 2,000-man French garrison under Brig-Gen Barrié lost 529 killed and wounded, while the rest were captured. The French Army of Portugal lost its entire siege train among the 142 captured cannon. There were two cannons embedded in the wall of the "greater" breach that caused most casualties in the storming. The 88th Connaught Rangers Regiment took one of the guns while the 45th Nottinghamshire Regiment took the other. The victory was marred when the British rank and file thoroughly sacked the city, despite the efforts of their officers. The capture of Ciudad Rodrigo allowed Wellington to proceed to Badajoz, whose taking was a much more bloody affair.

In 1812, the then-Viscount Wellington (later created a Duke) was rewarded for his victorious liberation with the hereditary Spanish ducal victory title of Duque de Ciudad Rodrigo.

Ciudad Rodrigo is also the birthplace of Siglo de Oro writer Feliciano de Silva.

== Sights ==
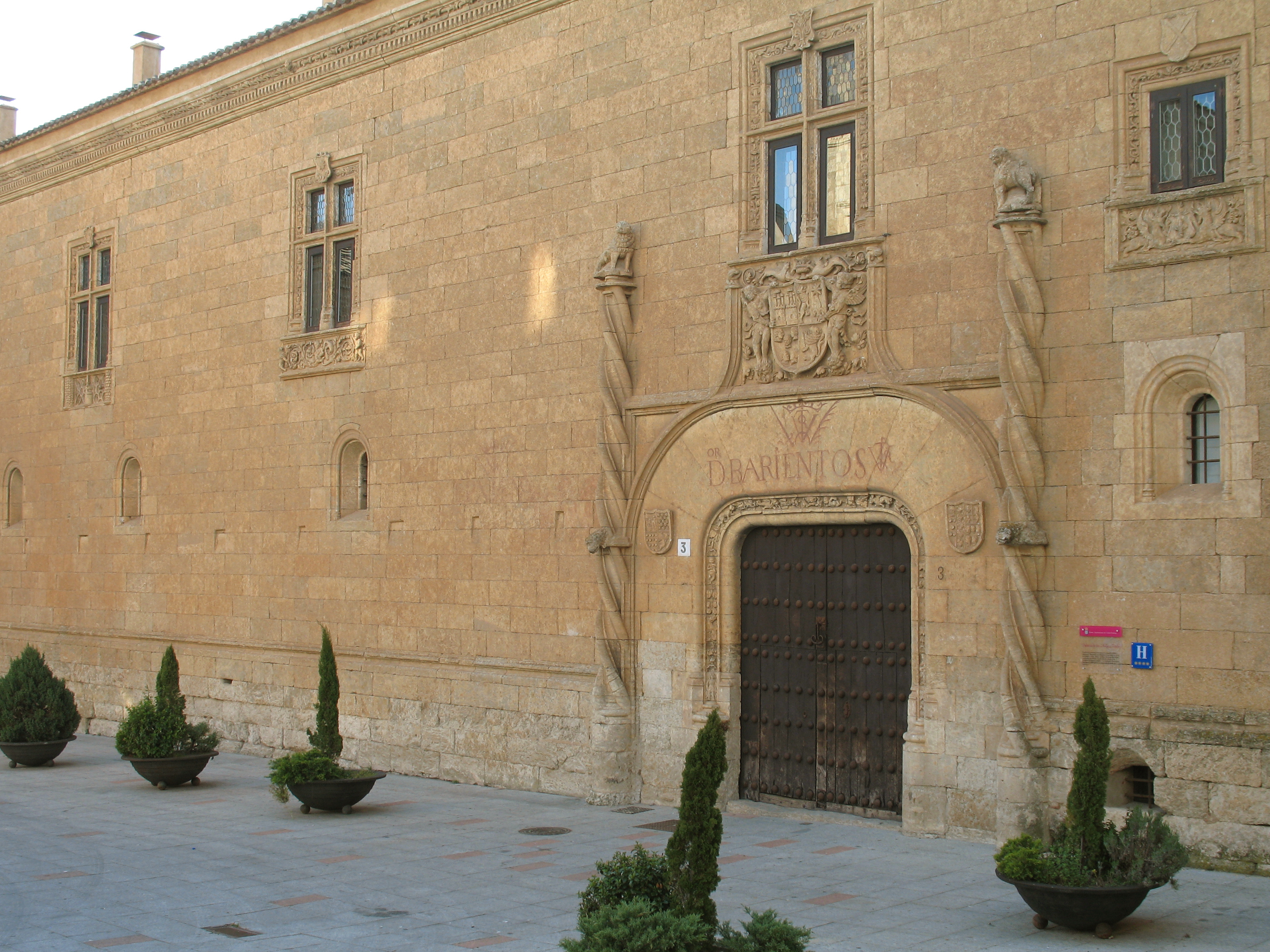
Ávila y Tiedra's palace

The historic centre of Ciudad Rodrigo is enclosed by the city walls.

- The walls were built during the 12th century. In the 17th century the walls were rebuilt and reinforced by bastions, ravelins and artillery batteries.
- The Cathedral of Santa María is a medieval cathedral. The original cathedral was constructed in the 12th century in late Romanesque style and was refurbished in the 16th century by Rodrigo Gil de Hontañón. The cathedral contains many artworks: The Portal of the main façade (Portico del Perdón), the 16th-century choir stalls, baroque retables, medieval sculptures, and tombs.
- Old mansions: There are several well preserved Renaissance and Baroque mansions and palaces such as:
  - Castro's Palace. With an outstanding façade.
  - The Palace of Moctezuma, a residence of the dukes of Moctezuma de Tultengo which now houses the municipal cultural center.
  - Palace of the Aguila, with a garden and two courtyards, one of them in Plateresque style.
  - And many others: Casa of the Cornejo, Casa of the Condes de Alba de Yeltes, Casa of the Vazquez,...
- The castle of Henry II of Castile was built in the 14th century, on a spur overlooking the Águeda river. It is currently used as a Parador, a kind of hotel located in a historic building.
- The Plaza Mayor, the central town square. Some historical buildings around the square include the 16th century city hall and the plateresque Casa del Marques de Cerralbo.
- Chapel of Cerralbo.

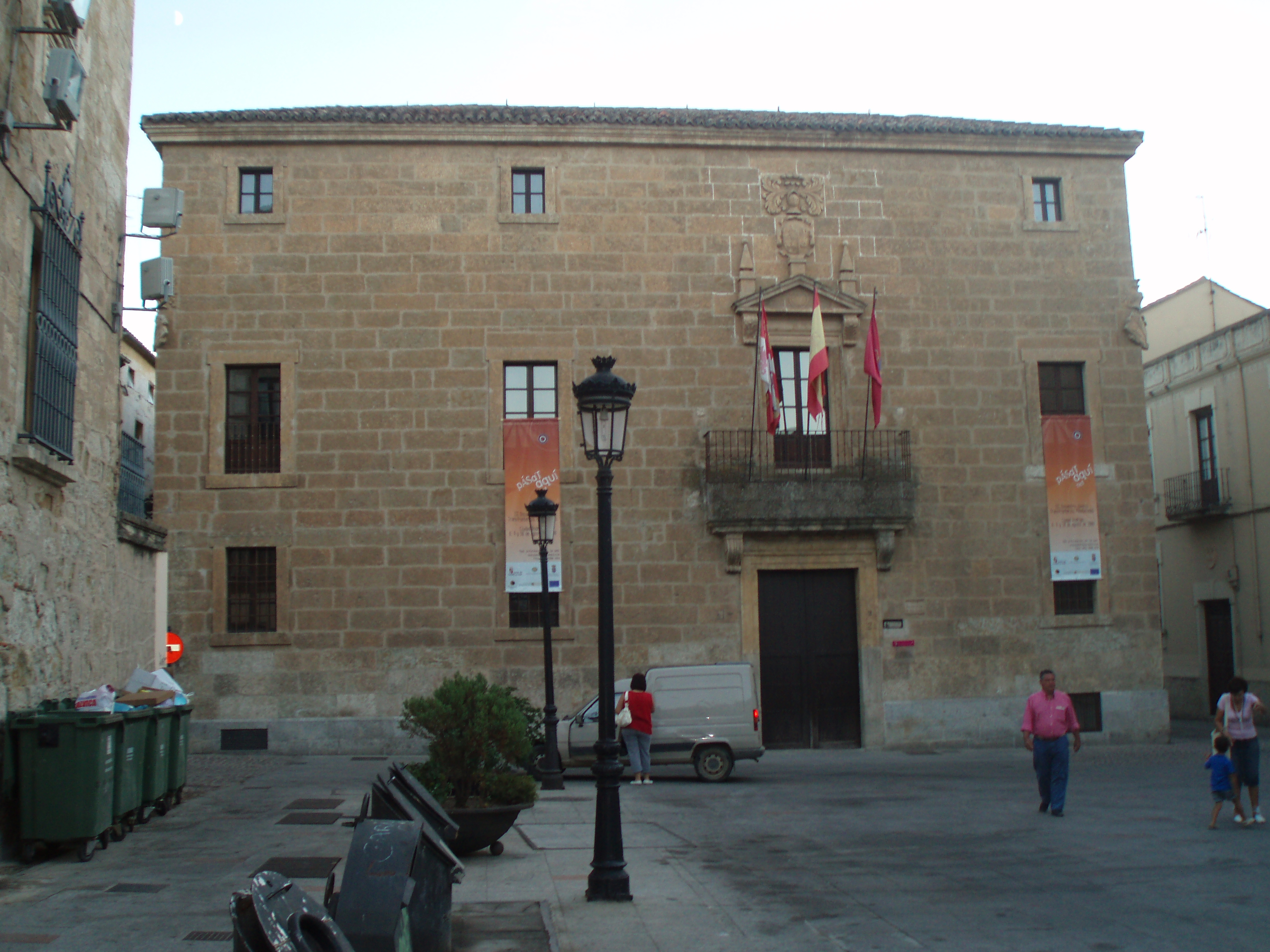
The Palace of Moctezuma

== The castle of Henry II of Castile ==
This castle was built by the medieval King Enrique II of Castile in 1372.

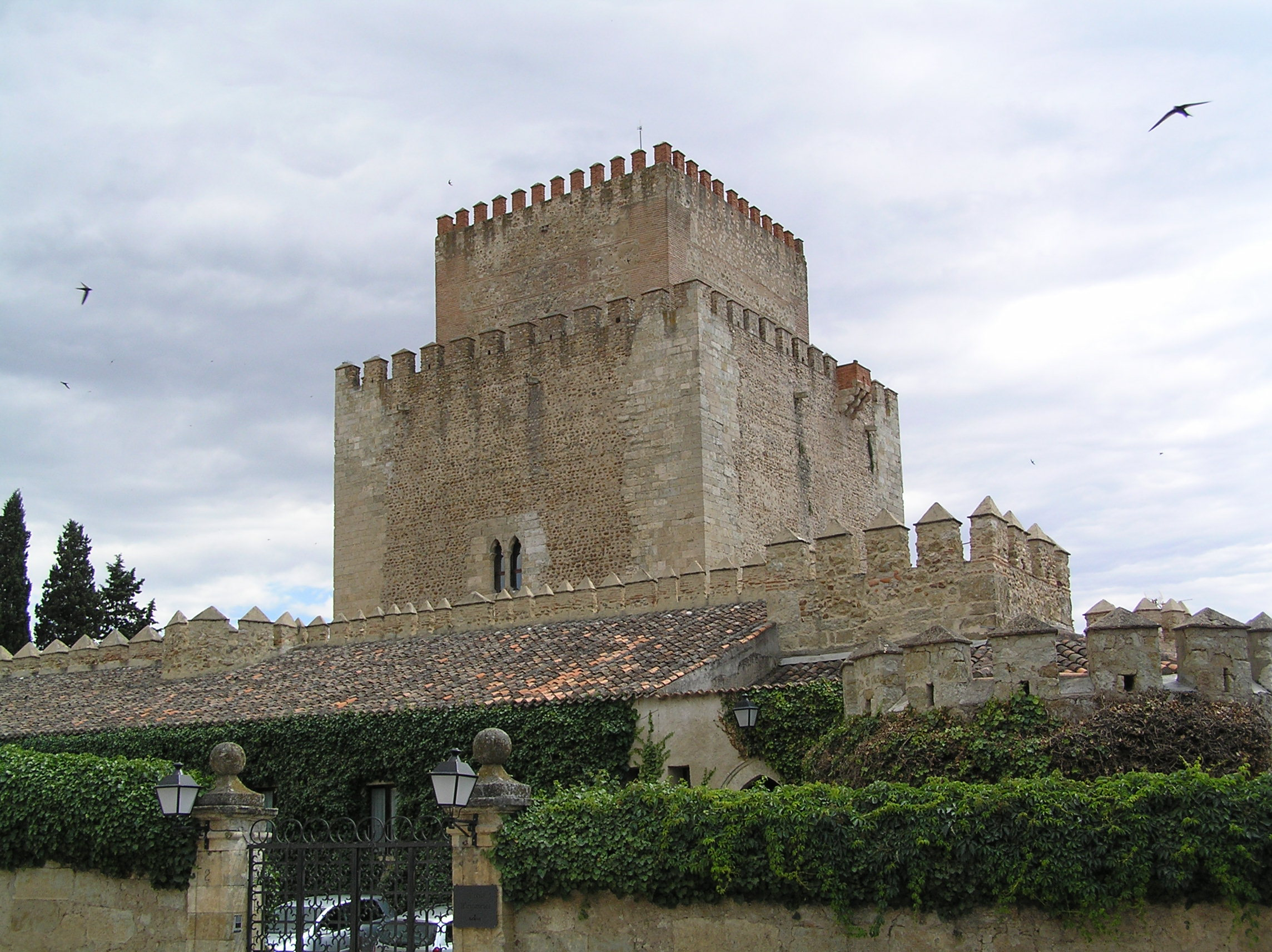
View of the Castle.

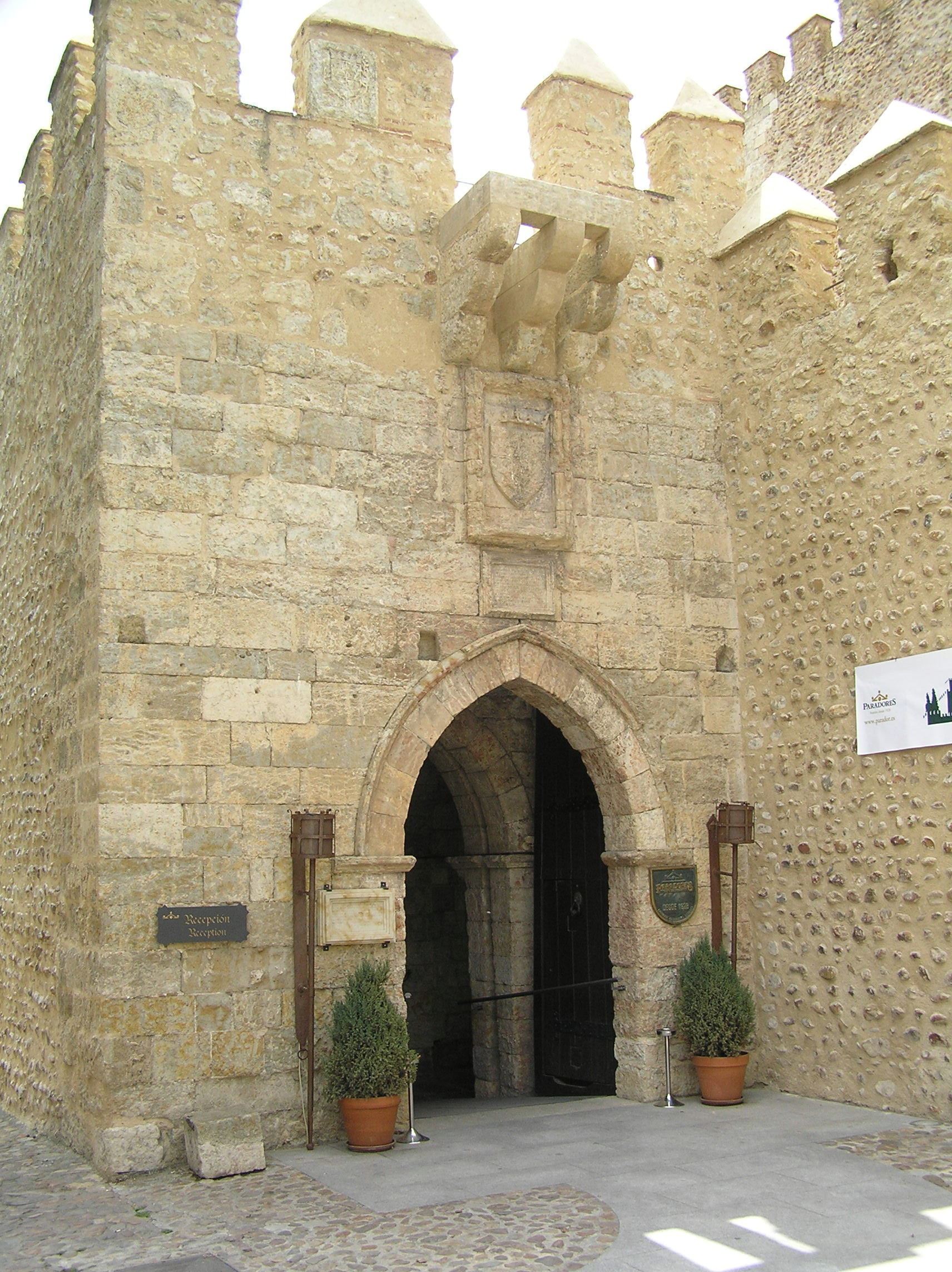
Entrance of the Castle.

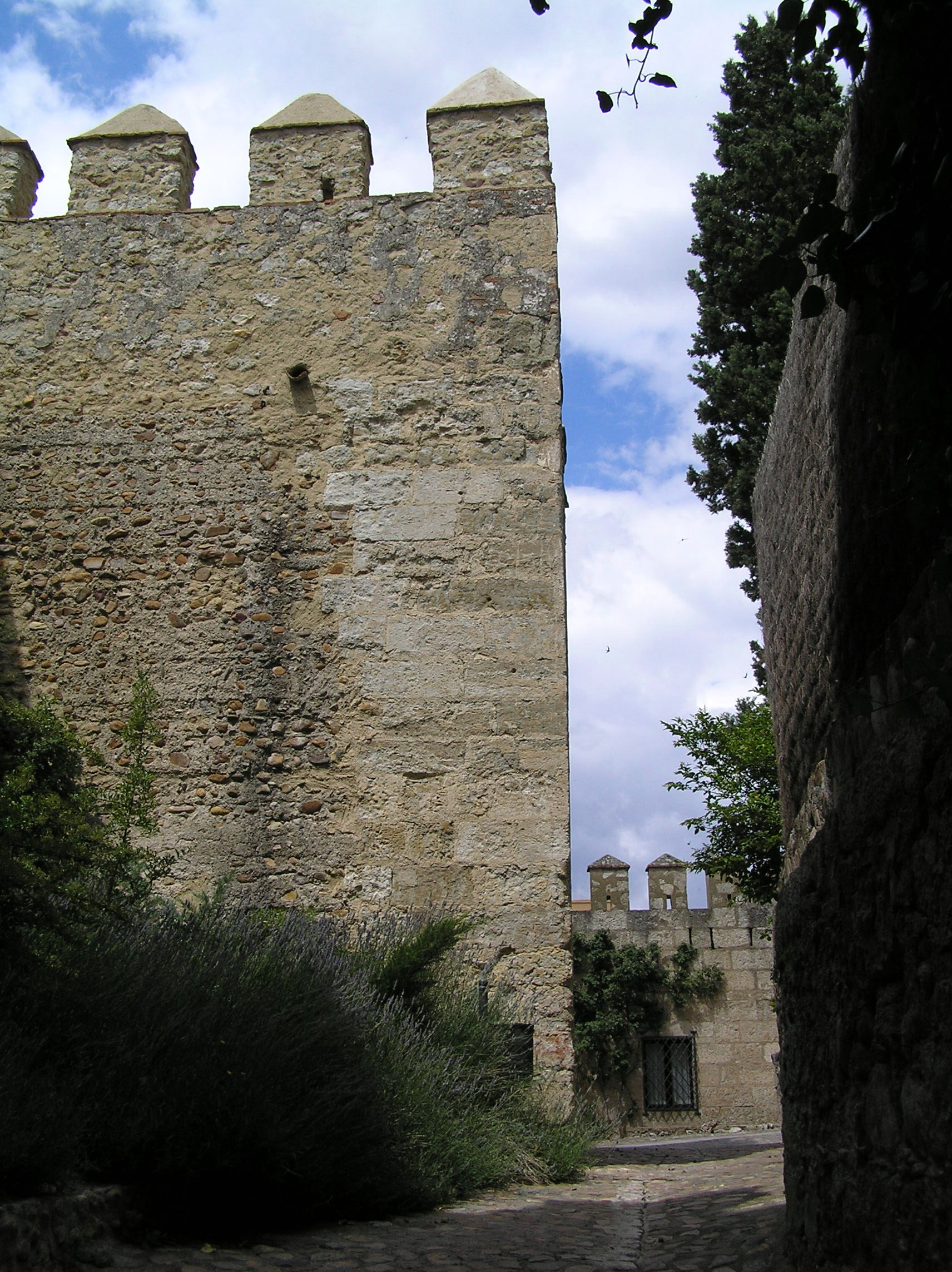
Interior courtyard.

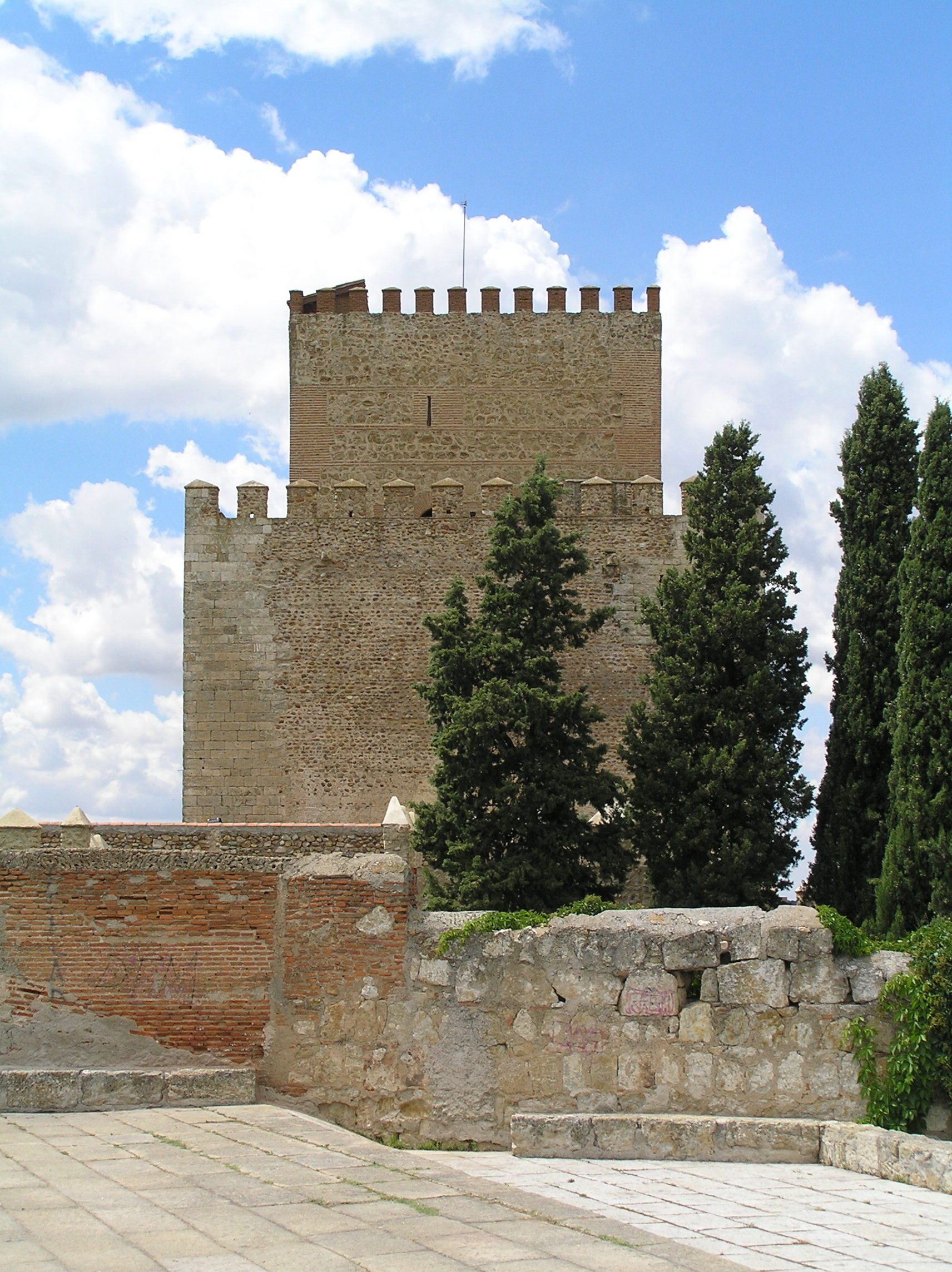
The homage tower as seen from the City Walls (east).

== International Relations ==
Ciudad Rodrigo is twinned with:

- – Aveiro, Portugal

== Other References ==
- William Smith, Dictionary of Greek and Roman Geography
- Chandler, David, Dictionary of the Napoleonic Wars Macmillan, 1979.
- Glover, Michael, The Peninsular War 1807–1814 Penguin, 1974.
- Smith, Digby, The Napoleonic Wars Data Book Greenhill, 1998.
