= Gil González Dávila (historian) =

Spanish biographer and antique collector

Gil González Dávila (Note: also written Gil González d'Ávila and Gil González de Ávila) (1570–1658) was a Spanish archivist, courtier and chronicler.

== Life ==
He was born and died at Ávila. He spent his early years in Rome, where he was educated at the residence of Cardinal Deza. He returned to Spain when he was 20 and settled in Salamanca. He was called to Madrid and made historiographer to the Crown of Castile in 1612, and for the Indies in 1641. Of his numerous works, the most valuable are his Teatro de las Grandezas des Madrid (Madrid, 1623, sqq.), and his Teatro Eclesiastico, descriptive of the metropolitan churches and cathedrals of Castile, with lives of the prelates (Madrid, 1645–1653, 4 vols.)
