= Juan Navarro Gaditanus =

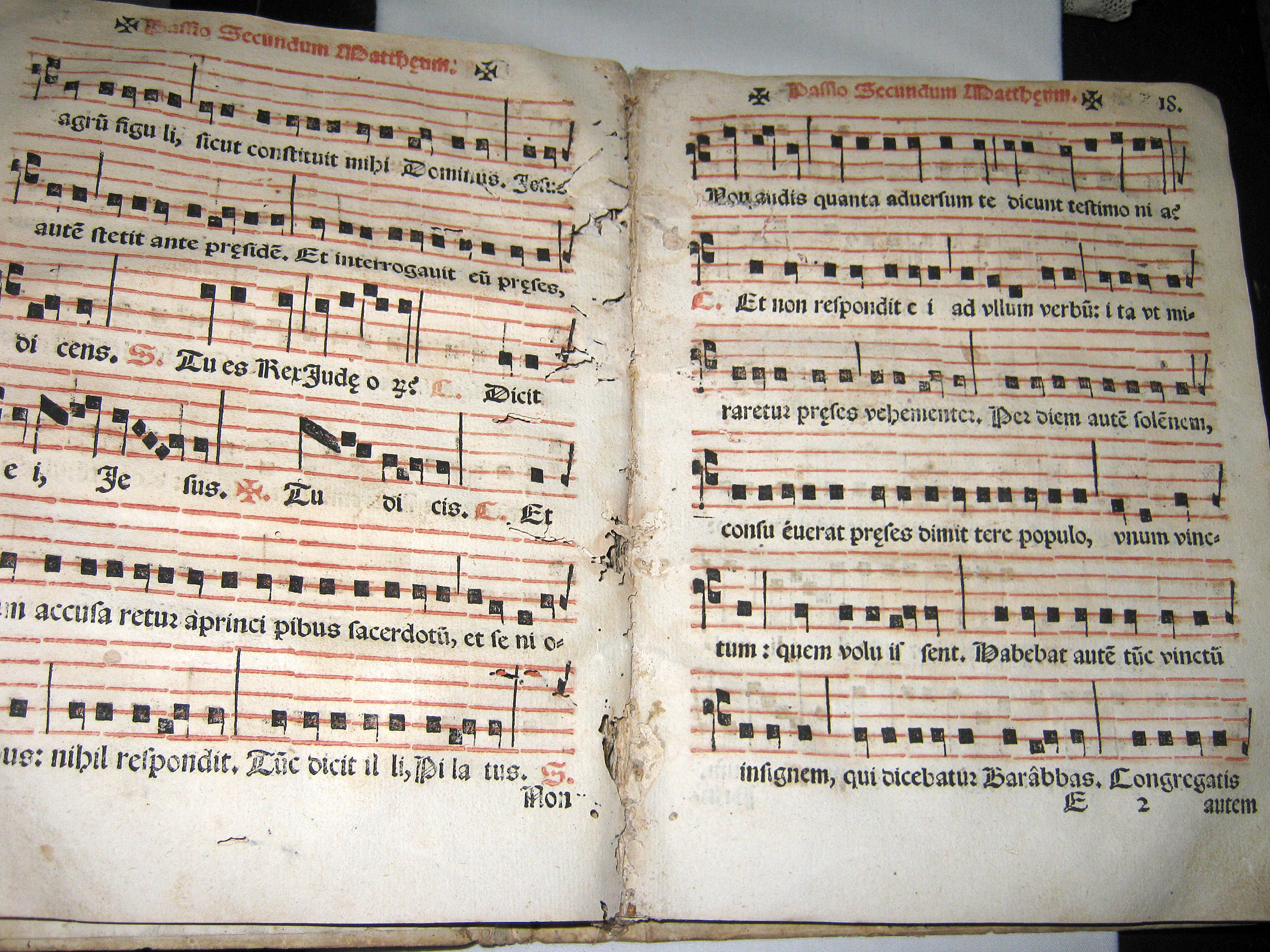
Page from the Quatuor passiones (1604)

Juan Navarro of Cadiz (Latin: Ioannes Nauarro Gaditanus)(ca. 1550–ca. 1610) was a Franciscan friar, and composer in Mexico. He is not related to the Spanish composer Juan Navarro of Seville, Juan Navarro Hispalensis (c. 1530-1580).

His main work is the settings of the four passions, Liber in quo quatuor passiones Christi Domini 1604, which was the only book of music printed in 17th century Mexico. He published this when resident at Michoacán.
