= Esteban Fernández de Castro =

Galician nobleman

- Lord
- Born: 13th-century
- Died: 13th-century Spain
- Noble family: House of Castro

Esteban Fernández de Castro (13th-century) was a Galician nobleman, Lord of Lemos and Sarria.

== Biography ==
Esteban was the son of Fernán Gutiérrez de Castro and Mélia Iñiguez de Mendoza. His wife was Aldonza daughter of Rodrigo Afonso de León and granddaughter of Alfonso IX.
