= Martín Alfonso de León =

- founder of Sancti Spiritus convent in Salamanca
- Born: c. 1220
- Died: bef. April 1272 (aged 52)
- Noble family: Castilian House of Ivrea
- Spouse: María Méndes de Sousa
- Father: Alfonso IX of León
- Mother: Teresa Gil de Soverosa

Martín Alfonso de León (c. 1220 – before April 1272) was an illegitimate son of Alfonso IX of León by Teresa Gil de Soverosa, a Portuguese noblewoman, daughter of Gil Vasques de Soverosa and María Aires de Fornelos, also mistress of King Sancho I of Portugal with whom she had a son and daughter.

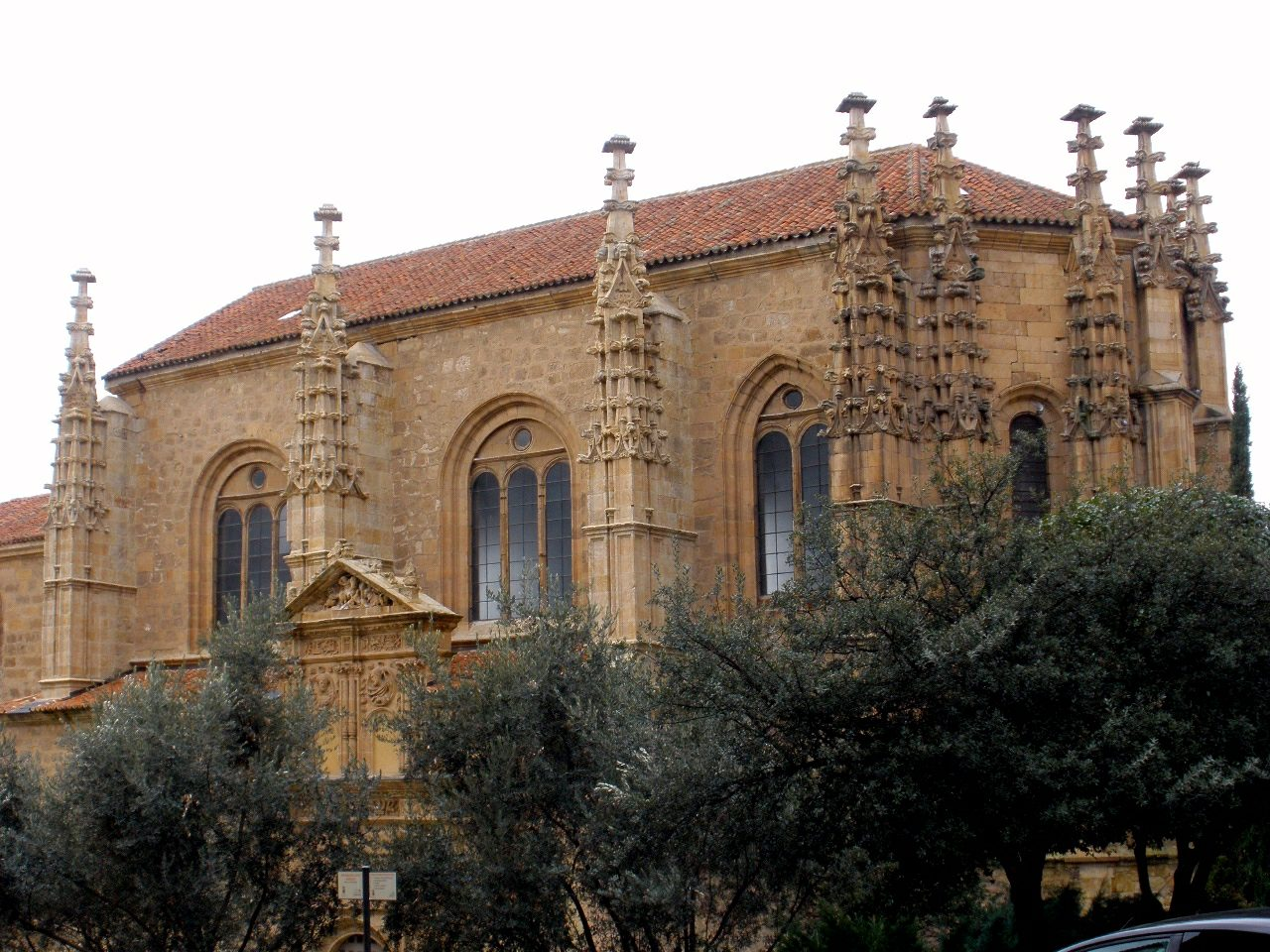
Church of Sancti Spiritus in Salamanca, built over the ruins of the former Monastery

== Life ==
The relationship between King Alfonso IX and Teresa began in 1218 and lasted until the king's death. They had one son, Martín, and three daughters, Sancha, María and Urraca, all born between 1218 and 1230, the year of Alfonso's death.

One of his first appearances in contemporary documentation was on 13 January 1243 at the Monastery of Santiago de Ermelo, in Bueu, Galicia, when he and his mother Taresia Egidii sold some property to a Martín Fernández and his wife. He and his wife María Méndez are recorded often in the cartulary of the Monastery of Sancti Spíritus in Salamanca which they founded in March 1268 with the support of Paio Peres Correia, Grand Master of the Order of Santiago, one of the few monasteries of the order reserved solely for women. They made many donations for its founding, including lands in Galicia, León, and Portugal, requesting to be buried there.

Martín appears for the last time in the documentation of this monastery on 3 November 1269. On 17 April 1272, María made another donation stating that she was a widow. On 27 May 1273, King Alfonso X of Castile confirmed to the municipality of Sancti-Spíritus all the fueros as a favor to the monastery that, as he mentions, María Méndez had built in Salamanca and where Martín Alfonso, "son of the King of León" was buried. María is mentioned for the last time in June 1279 when King Alfonso X, at her behest, exempted the inhabitants of the town and the monastery from payment of several taxes, also allowing the nuns who entered the monastery to bring their properties, under certain conditions.

== Marriage ==
Martín Alfonso only had one wife, María Méndes, daughter of Mem Gonçalves de Sousa (Menendo González de Sousa in Spanish) and Teresa Alfonso de Meneses, with whom he had no issue.

Francisco de Rades y Andrada, a Spanish 16th-century historian, misinterpreted Pedro Afonso, Count of Barcelos who had written that Martín Alfonso's grandfather, Gil Vasques de Soverosa had married three times: firstly with María Aires de Fornelos; secondly with Sancha González de Orbaneja; and, for the third time to María González Girón, having issue with all three wives. Rades y Andrada, erroneously, attributed the second and third wives to Gil Vasques de Soverosa's grandson, Martín, that is, he married the grandson to two of the grandfather's wives. A later genealogist, Ulloa Golfín, invented a son for Martín Alfonso and his supposed wife, María González Girón, known by the name of Gil Alfonso de León who never existed, either as a son of Gil Vázquez or of his grandson Martín, and who is claimed to be an ancestor of the Mogollón family of Extremadura.

== Sources ==
- Calderón Medina, Inés (2011). "Las otras mujeres del rey: El concubinato regio en el reino de León (1157- 1230)". Seminário Medieval 2009–2011 (PDF) (in Spanish). Coordinators:Ferreira, María do Rosário; Laranjinha, Ana Sofia; Ribeiro Miranda, José Carlos. Oporto: Instituto de Filosofía da Faculdade de Letras da Universidade do Porto. pp. 255–289. ISBN 9789898459145. Archived from the original (PDF) on 2020-11-20.
- Carvalho Correia, Francisco (2008). O Mosteiro de Santo Tirso de 978 a 1588: a silhueta de uma entidade projectada no chao de uma história milenária (in Portuguese) (1st ed.). Santiago de Compostela: Universidade de Santiago de Compostela: Servizo de Publicacións e Intercambio Científico. ISBN 978-84-9887-038-1. Archived from the original on October 4, 2013.
- Echániz Sanz, María (1993). El monasterio femenino de Sancti Spíritus de Salamanca. Colección Diplomática (1268-1400) (in Spanish). Salamanca: Ediciones Universidad de Salamanca. ISBN 84-7481-748-X.
- Lodo de Mayoralgo, José Miguel (1985). "Los Blázquez de Cáceres, los Mayoralgos, y los Ovandos, estudio crítico sobre su origen y genealogía (Siglos XIII al XV)". Estudios Genealógicos y Heráldicos (in Spanish). No. 1. Madrid: Asociación Española de Estudios Genealógicos y Heráldicos. pp. 65–168. ISBN 84-398-3591-4.
- Menéndez Pidal de Navascués, Faustino (1999). Leones y Castillos: emblemas heráldicos de España (in Spanish). Madrid: Real Academia de la Historia. ISBN 8489512396.
- Romaní Martínez, Miguel; Otero Piñeyro Maseda, Pablo S. (2005). El antiguo monasterio de Santiago de Ermelo. Estudio, documentación e índices (in Spanish). Santiago de Compostela: CSIC, Xunta de Galicia, Instituto de Estudios Gallegos «Padre Sarmiento». ISBN 84-00-08342-3.
