= Ponce de León (disambiguation) =

Juan Ponce de León (1474–1521) was an early Spanish explorer who is credited as being the first European to land in North America, and was the first colonial governor of Puerto Rico.

Ponce de León may also refer to:

== Places ==
- Ponce de Leon, Florida, a town in the northern Florida panhandle
- Ponce de León Hotel, a former hotel in St. Augustine, Florida, now part of Flagler College
- Ponce de Leon Springs State Park, a park in the Florida panhandle
- Ponce de León Inlet, an inlet of the Atlantic Ocean on the east coast of Florida
  - Ponce de Leon Inlet Light, a lighthouse in Florida at Ponce de Leon Inlet
- Ponce de León Island, a barrier island on the Atlantic coast of Florida
- Ponce de Leon amusement park, a former amusement park in Atlanta, Georgia
- Ponce de Leon Avenue, a thoroughfare in Atlanta, Georgia
- Ponce de Leon Park, a former baseball park in Atlanta, Georgia
- Ponce de Leon Springs (Atlanta), former springs in Atlanta, Georgia
- Ponce de Leon Apartments, part of the Fox Theatre Historic District, Midtown Atlanta, Georgia
- Ponce de Leon, Missouri, an unincorporated community
- Avenida Juan Ponce de León, a thoroughfare in San Juan, Puerto Rico

== Other uses ==
- Ponce de Leon (train), a train operated by the Southern Railway in the southeast United States
- House of Ponce de León, a noble house
- Ponce de Leon, a, 1804 play by Clemens Brentano

== People with the surname ==
- Alberto Yarini y Ponce de León (1882–1910), Cuban criminal
- Alfonso Ponce de León (1906-1936), Spanish painter
- Antonio Ponce de León, 11th Duke of Arcos (1726–1780), military officer
- Daniel Ponce de León (born 1980), Mexican boxer
- Daniel Ponce de Leon (born 1992), American baseball player
- Diego de Alvear y Ponce de León (1749–1830), Spanish military commander and politician
- Diego de Vargas (Diego de Vargas Zapata y Luján Ponce de León y Contreras, 1643–1704), Spanish governor of the New Spain territory of Santa Fe de Nuevo México, today the U.S. states of New Mexico and Arizona
- Ernesto Zedillo Ponce de León (born 1951), President of Mexico from 1994 to 2000
- Fernando Ponce de León (1917–1998), Colombian writer
- Fidelio Ponce de León (1895–1949), Cuban painter
- Gisela Ponce de León (born 1985), Peruvian actress and singer
- Juan Ponce de León II (1524–1591), grandson of Juan Ponce de León and the first native-born Puerto Rican to become governor of Puerto Rico
- Juan Ponce de León y Loayza, son of Juan Ponce de León II, and early settler of Ponce, Puerto Rico
- Luis Ponce de León (governor of New Spain) (fl. 1525–1526), Spanish governor of New Spain
- Luis Ponce de León (1527–1591), Spanish poet
- Michael Ponce de Leon (1922–2006) American artist
- Nicolás Ponce de León (1590/95–1654), acting governor of Florida in 1631-1633 and 1651
- Nicolás Suárez Ponce de León II, acting governor of Florida in 1663–1664, and 1673–1675
- Norival Ponce de León (1927–1965), Brazilian footballer
- Patricio Ponce de León (1919–2010), Cuban mycologist
- Pedro Ponce de León (1520–1584) Spanish Benedictine monk who is often credited as being "the first teacher for the deaf"
- Pedro Ponce de León the Elder (fl. 1330–1352), Castilian nobleman
- Pedro Ponce de León (bishop of Plasencia) (1509–1573), Spanish bishop
- Pedro Ponce de Léon (bishop of Zamora) (born 1561), Spanish bishop
- Pedro Ponce de León y Riquelme, Governor of Venezuela Province (1566–1569)
- Rodrigo Ponce de León, Duke of Cádiz (1443–1492), Castilian military leader
- Rodrigo Ponce de León, 4th Duke of Arcos (1602–1658), viceroy of Naples (r. 1646–48)

=== Fictional ===
- Augusto Ponce de León, a character in Camaleones
- Ponce De Leon, a character in Clone High
