= Juan Ponce de León (disambiguation) =

Juan Ponce de León (1474–1521) was a Spanish explorer known for seeking the Fountain of Youth and the first Governor of Puerto Rico.

Juan Ponce de León may also refer to:

- Juan Ponce de León II (1524–1591), grandson of Juan Ponce de León; first Puerto Rican Governor of Puerto Rico
- Juan Ponce de León y Loayza, son of Juan Ponce de León II; Ponce, Puerto Rico is named for him
- Juan Ponce de León Reyes, Uruguayan film director

== See also ==
- Ponce de León (disambiguation)
