= Pedro Ponce de León (disambiguation) =

Pedro Ponce de León was a Benedictine monk.

Pedro Ponce de León may also refer to:

- Pedro Ponce de León (bishop of Plasencia) (1510–1573), Spanish Roman Catholic bishop
- Pedro Ponce de Léon (bishop of Zamora) (born 1561), Spanish Roman Catholic bishop
- Pedro Ponce de León the Elder (died 1352), Castilian nobleman
- Pedro Ponce de León (Adelantado) (died 1314), Castilian nobleman
