= Antonio Rodríguez de Pazos y Figueroa =

Spanish Roman Catholic prelate (died 1586)

Most Reverend Antonio Rodríguez de Pazos y Figueroa
- Bishop of Córdoba
- Church: Catholic Church
- Diocese: Diocese of Córdoba
- In office: 1582–1586
- Predecessor: Martín de Córdoba Mendoza
- Successor: Francisco Pacheco de Córdoba
- Previous post: Bishop of Patti (1568–1578)

Orders
- Consecration: 8 December 1568 by Francisco Pacheco de Villena

Personal details
- Died: 28 June 1586 Córdoba, Spain

Antonio Rodríguez de Pazos y Figueroa (died 1586) was a Roman Catholic prelate who served as Bishop of Córdoba (1582–1586) and Bishop of Patti (1568–1578).

== Biography ==
On 17 September 1568, Antonio Rodríguez de Pazos y Figueroa was appointed during the papacy of Pope Pius V as Bishop of Patti. On 8 December 1568, he was consecrated bishop by Francisco Pacheco de Villena, Cardinal-Deacon of Santa Croce in Gerusalemme, with Gaspar Cervantes de Gaete, Archbishop of Tarragona, and Diego de Simancas, Bishop of Badajoz, serving as co-consecrators. He resigned as Bishop of Patti on 29 October 1578. On 19 March 1582, he was appointed during the papacy of Pope Gregory XIII as Bishop of Córdoba. He served as Bishop of Córdoba until his death on 28 June 1586.

== Episcopal succession ==
While bishop, he was the principal consecrator of:

- Pedro Fernández Temiño, Bishop of Ávila (1582);

and the principal co-consecrator of:

- Rodrigo de Vadillo, Bishop of Cefalù (1569);
- Jerónimo Albornoz, Bishop of Córdoba (1571);
- Antonio Paliettino (de Monelia), Bishop of Brugnato (1571); and
- Andrés Cabrera Bobadilla, Bishop of Segovia (1583).

== External links and additional sources ==
- Cheney, David M. "Diocese of Patti". Catholic-Hierarchy.org. (for Chronology of Bishops) ^{[self-published]}
- Chow, Gabriel. "Diocese of Patti". GCatholic.org. (for Chronology of Bishops) ^{[self-published]}
- Cheney, David M. "Diocese of Córdoba". Catholic-Hierarchy.org. (for Chronology of Bishops) ^{[self-published]}
- Chow, Gabriel. "Diocese of Córdoba". GCatholic.org. (for Chronology of Bishops) ^{[self-published]}

Catholic Church titles
Preceded by Bartolomé Sebastián de Aroitia	Bishop of Patti; 1568–1578	Succeeded by Gilberto Isfar y Corillas
Preceded by Martín de Córdoba Mendoza	Bishop of Córdoba; 1582–1586	Succeeded by Francisco Pacheco de Córdoba
