= Andrés Pérez =

Andrés Pérez may refer to:

- Andrés Pérez (artist) (c. 1660–1727), Spanish baroque painter
- Andrés Pérez (bishop) (died 1583), Spanish Roman Catholic bishop
- Andrés Pérez (footballer, born 1988) Puerto Rican footballer
- Andrés Pérez (footballer, born 1980), Colombian footballer
- Andrés Pérez de Lara, Mexican NASCAR driver
- Andrés Pérez de Ribas (1576–1655), Spanish Jesuit missionary
- Carlos Andrés Pérez, (1922–2010), Venezuelan politician
