= Federico Caccia =

Italian diplomat, Cardinal and Archbishop

His Eminence Federico Caccia
- Cardinal, Archbishop of Milan
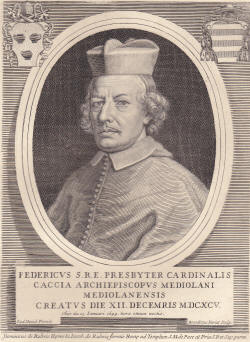
- Church: Catholic Church
- See: Milan
- Appointed: 13 April 1693
- Predecessor: Federico Visconti
- Successor: Giuseppe Archinto
- Other post: Cardinal Priest of Santa Pudenziana

Orders
- Consecration: 4 January 1693 (Bishop) by Galeazzo Marescotti
- Created cardinal: 12 December 1695

Personal details
- Born: 10 June 1635 Milan
- Died: 14 January 1699 (aged 63) Milan
- Buried: Cathedral of Milan
- Coat of arms

Federico Caccia (10 June 1635 – 14 January 1699) was an Italian diplomat, Cardinal, and Archbishop of Milan from 1693 to 1699.

== Early life ==
Caccia was born on 10 June 1635 in Milan to a noble family from Novara. Orphaned early in childhood, he studied under the Jesuits in the College of Brera in Milan and later he was admitted at the Collegio Borromeo. He earned a doctorate in utroque iure at the University of Pavia and took up a career as lawyer in Milan.

In 1667, he moved to Rome where, as lawyer, he gained assignments in the Roman Curia. He was also rector for four years of the Archgimnasium of Rome. His works as lawyer are mostly lost.

In view of more demanding services, he was appointed titular archbishop of Laodicea in Phrygia on 2 January 1693 and consecrated bishop on 4 January 1693 by Cardinal Galeazzo Marescotti in Rome with Prospero Bottini, Titular Archbishop of Myra, and Stefano Giuseppe Menatti, Titular Bishop of Cyrene, serving as co-consecrators. The day after, he left Rome as Nuncio to the Kingdom of Spain, where he succeeded to gain the confidence of Charles II.

== Archbishop of Milan ==
On 13 April 1693, Federico Caccia was appointed Archbishop of Milan, however he entered Milan only on 11 December 1696 due to his ongoing diplomatic services and to a term of about six months in Rome. On 12 December 1695, he was appointed Cardinal Priest of Santa Pudenziana.

As Archbishop of Milan, he convened all the vicars of the diocese of Milan on 16 March 1697, and made a pastoral visit to the valley of Ticino. He was able to keep such good relations with the Spanish government that he was appointed by Charles II of Spain as temporary governor of the Duchy of Milan in 1697.

He is remembered for his love for the paupers to whom he left by will all his properties. Federico Caccia died in Milan on 14 January 1699 and his remains were buried in the North transept of the Cathedral of Milan. While bishop, he was the principal consecrator of Francisco Manuel de Zúñiga Sotomayor y Mendoza, Bishop of Ciudad Rodrigo.
