= Fernando de Carvajal y Ribera =

Roman Catholic prelate

Most Reverend Fernando de Carvajal y Ribera O. de M.
- Archbishop of Santo Domingo
- Church: Catholic Church
- Archdiocese: Archdiocese of Santo Domingo
- In office: 1687–1700
- Predecessor: Domingo Fernández Navarrete
- Successor: Francisco del Rincón

Orders
- Consecration: 18 May 1687 by Marcello Durazzo

Personal details
- Born: 1632 Salamanca, Spain
- Died: 24 April 1701 (age 69)

Fernando de Carvajal y Ribera, O. de M. (also Fernando de Carvajal y Rivera) (1632 – 24 April 1701) was a Roman Catholic prelate who served as the Archbishop of Santo Domingo (1687–1700).

== Biography ==
Fernando de Carvajal y Ribera was born in Salamanca, Spain and was ordained a friar in the Order of the Blessed Virgin Mary of Mercy. On 3 March 1687, he was selected by the King of Spain and confirmed by Pope Innocent XI as Archbishop of Santo Domingo. On 18 May 1687, he was consecrated bishop by Marcello Durazzo, Titular Archbishop of Chalcedon. He served as Archbishop of Santo Domingo until his resignation in December 1700. He died on 24 April 1701. While bishop, he was the principal consecrator of José González Blázquez, Bishop of Ciudad Rodrigo (1688), and the principal co-consecrator of Gregorio Solórzano Castillo, Bishop of Ávila (1700).

== External links and additional sources ==
- Cheney, David M. "Archdiocese of Santo Domingo". Catholic-Hierarchy.org. (for Chronology of Bishops) ^{[self-published]}
- Chow, Gabriel. "Metropolitan Archdiocese of Santo Domingo". GCatholic.org. (for Chronology of Bishops) ^{[self-published]}

Catholic Church titles
Preceded by Domingo Fernández Navarrete	Archbishop of Santo Domingo; 1687–1700	Succeeded by Francisco del Rincón
