= Pedro de Portocarrero =

Pedro de Portocarrero may refer to:

- Pedro Portocarrero (bishop, died 1600), Spanish Roman Catholic bishop
- Pedro de Portocarrero (conquistador) (c. 1504 – c. 1539), a Spanish conquistador active in Guatemala and Mexico

== See also ==
- Pedro Portocarrero (archbishop of Granada) (died 1526), Spanish Roman Catholic bishop
