= Jerónimo Albornoz =

16th-century Catholic bishop

Most Reverend Jerónimo Albornoz
- Bishop of Córdoba
- Church: Catholic Church
- Diocese: Diocese of Córdoba
- In office: 1570–1574
- Predecessor: Francisco Beaumonte
- Successor: Jerónimo de Villa Carrillo

Orders
- Consecration: 22 July 1571 by Francisco Pacheco de Villena

Personal details
- Born: 1530 Spain
- Died: 27 October 1574 (aged 43–44) Córdoba, Argentina

Jerónimo Albornoz, O.F.M. (1530–1574) was a Roman Catholic prelate who served as Bishop of Córdoba (1570–1574).

== Biography ==
Jerónimo Albornoz was born in Spain in 1530 and ordained a priest in the Order of Friars Minor. On 27 August 1570, he was selected by the King of Spain as Bishop of Córdoba and confirmed by Pope Pius V on 8 November 1570. On 22 July 1571, he was consecrated bishop by Francisco Pacheco de Villena, Cardinal-Deacon of Santa Croce in Gerusalemme, with Balduino de Balduinis, Bishop of Aversa, and Antonio Rodríguez de Pazos y Figueroa, Bishop of Patti, with serving as co-consecrators. He served as Bishop of Córdoba until his death on 27 October 1574.

Catholic Church titles
Preceded by Francisco Beaumonte	Bishop of Córdoba; 1570–1574	Succeeded by Jerónimo de Villa Carrillo
