= Jerónimo Manrique de Lara =

Jerónimo Manrique de Lara may refer to:

- Jerónimo Manrique de Lara (bishop of Ávila) (1538–1595), Spanish Roman Catholic bishop and inquisitor
- Jerónimo Manrique de Lara (bishop of Salamanca) (1530–1593), Spanish Roman Catholic bishop
- Jerónimo Manrique de Lara y de Herrera (1581–1644), Spanish Roman Catholic bishop
