= Luis Fernández de Córdoba =

Roman Catholic prelate (1555–1625)

Most Reverend Luis Fernández de Córdoba
- Archbishop of Seville
- Church: Catholic Church
- Archdiocese: Archdiocese of Seville
- In office: 1624–1625
- Predecessor: Pedro Castro Quiñones
- Successor: Diego Guzmán de Haros
- Previous posts: Bishop of Salamanca (1603–1615); Bishop of Málaga (1615–1622); Archbishop of Santiago de Compostela (1622–1624)

Orders
- Consecration: 9 February 1603 by Domenico Ginnasi

Personal details
- Born: February 1555 Córdoba, Andalusia, Spain
- Died: 26 June 1625 (age 70) Seville, Spain

Luis Fernández de Córdoba (February 1555 – 26 June 1625) was a Roman Catholic prelate who served as Archbishop of Seville (1624–1625), Archbishop of Santiago de Compostela (1622–1624), Bishop of Málaga (1615–1622), and Bishop of Salamanca (1603–1615).

== Biography ==
Luis Fernández de Córdoba was born in Córdoba, Andalusia, Spain in February 1555. On 20 November 1602, he was appointed during the papacy of Pope Clement VIII as Bishop of Salamanca. On 9 February 1603, he was consecrated bishop by Domenico Ginnasi, Archbishop of Manfredonia, with Juan Bautista Acevedo Muñoz, Bishop of Valladolid, and Domingo de Oña, Bishop of Coro, serving as co-consecrators. On 9 February 1615, he was appointed during the papacy of Pope Paul V as Bishop of Malaga. On 26 October 1622, he was appointed during the papacy of Pope Gregory XV as Archbishop of Santiago de Compostela. On 11 March 1624, he was appointed during the papacy of Pope Urban VIII as Archbishop of Seville. He served as Archbishop of Seville until his death on 26 June 1625.

== Episcopal succession ==
While bishop, he was the principal consecrator of:

- Pedro Ponce de Léon, Bishop of Ciudad Rodrigo (1605);
- Agustín Antolínez, Bishop of Ciudad Rodrigo (1623);
- Gonzalo del Campo (López de Ocampo), Archbishop of Lima (1624);

and the principal co-consecrator of:

- Antonio Corrionero, Bishop of Islas Canarias (1615).

== External links and additional sources ==
- Cheney, David M. "Diocese of Salamanca". Catholic-Hierarchy.org. (for Chronology of Bishops) ^{[self-published]}
- Chow, Gabriel. "Diocese of Salamanca (Spain)". GCatholic.org. (for Chronology of Bishops) ^{[self-published]}
- Cheney, David M. "Diocese of Málaga". Catholic-Hierarchy.org. (for Chronology of Bishops) ^{[self-published]}
- Chow, Gabriel. "Diocese of Malaga (Spain)". GCatholic.org. (for Chronology of Bishops) ^{[self-published]}
- Cheney, David M. "Archdiocese of Santiago de Compostela". Catholic-Hierarchy.org. (for Chronology of Bishops) ^{[self-published]}
- Chow, Gabriel. "Archdiocese of Santiago de Compostela (Spain)". GCatholic.org. (for Chronology of Bishops) ^{[self-published]}
- Cheney, David M. "Archdiocese of Sevilla {Seville}". Catholic-Hierarchy.org. (for Chronology of Bishops) ^{[self-published]}
- Chow, Gabriel. "Metropolitan Archdiocese of Sevilla (Spain)". GCatholic.org. (for Chronology of Bishops) ^{[self-published]}

Catholic Church titles
Preceded by Pedro Junco Posada	Bishop of Salamanca; 1603–1615	Succeeded by Diego Ordóñez
Preceded by Juan Alonso Moscoso	Bishop of Málaga; 1615–1622	Succeeded by Francisco Hurtado de Mendoza y Ribera
Preceded by Juan Beltrán Guevara y Figueroa	Archbishop of Santiago de Compostela; 1622–1624	Succeeded by Agustín Antolínez
Preceded by Pedro Castro Quiñones	Archbishop of Seville; 1624–1625	Succeeded by Diego Guzmán de Haros
