= Juan Aceres =

Spanish Roman Catholic prelate

Most Reverend Juan Aceres
- Bishop of Ciudad Rodrigo
- Church: Catholic Church
- Diocese: Diocese of Ciudad Rodrigo
- In office: 1546–1549
- Predecessor: Francisco de Navarra y Hualde
- Successor: Pedro Ponce de León (bishop of Plasencia)

Personal details
- Born: Spain
- Died: 31 July 1549 Ciudad Rodrigo, Spain

Juan Aceres (died 1549) was a Roman Catholic prelate who served as Bishop of Ciudad Rodrigo (1546–1549).

== Biography ==
Juan Aceres was born in Spain. On 8 January 1546, he was appointed during the papacy of Pope Paul III as Bishop of Ciudad Rodrigo. He served as Bishop of Ciudad Rodrigo until his death on 31 July 1549.

== See also ==
- Catholic Church in Spain

== External links and additional sources ==
- Cheney, David M. "Diocese of Ciudad Rodrigo". Catholic-Hierarchy.org. (for Chronology of Bishops) ^{[self-published]}
- Chow, Gabriel. "Diocese of Ciudad Rodrigo". GCatholic.org. (for Chronology of Bishops) ^{[self-published]}

Catholic Church titles
Preceded by Francisco de Navarra y Hualde	Bishop of Ciudad Rodrigo; 1546–1549	Succeeded by Pedro Ponce de León (bishop of Plasencia)
