= Pedro de Ponte =

Pedro de Ponte (floruit 1163–90), possibly a Galician, was the royal chancellor of the Kingdom of León from 1170 to 1172 and the second bishop of the newly founded see of Ciudad Rodrigo from 1174 until his death. His predecessor, Bishop Domingo, is a shadowy figure who was deceased by 1173 at the latest.

Pedro was a royal clerk from at least as early as 1163, and was awarded prebends in the wealthy dioceses of Oviedo and Santiago de Compostela. After being awarded the bishopric, he visited the Roman curia in 1175 to receive confirmation of the new diocese, since King Ferdinand II had founded it without papal approval. This he received, although not without also receiving a rebuke for the king. Pedro returned to Rome in 1179 to attend the Third Lateran Council. Nothing further of his episcopal activity is known, but in 1189 he made a personal donation to the far-off monastery of Sobrado, fuelling academic speculation that he may have hailed from that region.

Pedro was succeeded as bishop by Martín, who is known only from some royal charters and from a stint as a papal judge delegate.

== Sources ==
- Fletcher, Richard (1978). The Episcopate in the Kingdom of León in the Twelfth Century. Oxford: Oxford University Press.
