= Domingo Fernández Navarrete =

Spanish Dominican missionary (1610-1689)

Domingo Fernández Navarrete (c. 1610 in Peñafiel – 1689, in Santo Domingo) was a Spanish Dominican missionary and archbishop.

== Biography ==
Born in Peñafiel in Old Castile, Navarrete received the habit around 1630 and after completing his studies was offered the chair of Thomistic theology by several Spanish universities. He declined all the offers, preferring to go into the missionary field. In 1646, he and twenty-seven brethren left Spain for the Philippines via Mexico. They arrived at their destination on 23 June 1648.

Navarrete taught theology at the Dominican University of St. Thomas, Manila, before he left with a group to go on a mission to China in 1657. After learning the language, he labored chiefly in Fujian province. When persecution broke out in 1665, the effect on missions was disastrous. Forbidden to preach, Navarrate occupied himself with writing, hoping in this way to spread and confirm the faith. However, he was hampered too much and left for Rome in 1673 as prefect of the Dominican mission to discuss the question of Chinese Rites. This problem had reached an acute stage in China, with the Jesuits on one side and the Dominicans and Franciscans on the other. Navarrate was highly respected by Pope Innocent XI, who wanted to make him bishop of the Chinese missions; however, Navarrete refused.

It was at this time (1676) that Navarrete's book, Tratados historicos, politicos, ethicos, y religiosos de la monarchia de China was published in Madrid. A strongly anti-Jesuit work (which, e.g. denied the authenticity of the Nestorian Stele), it was translated into most major European languages. It became particularly popular in England, and admired by the French Jansenists and Voltaire. Jesuits, on the other hand, tried to have this book suppressed.

On his return to Spain in 1677, the Pope, at the suggestion of Charles II, forced him to accept the Archdiocese of Santo Domingo, where he laboured until his death. While on the question of Chinese Rites he was opposed to the Jesuits; in his diocese he had the highest regard for them. In his letters to the viceroy and to the king, requesting them to permit the fathers of the Society to establish a college in his residential city, Navarrete pays them a glowing tribute.

Navarrete was one of the few individuals to visit Kaili on the west coast of Sulawesi, He provides some of the most accurate early accounts of Minahasa also.

== Principal works ==
- Tratados históricos, políticos, éticos y religiosos de la monarquia de China (Madrid, 1676)
- Catechismus, lingua sinica, 2 vol.
- Præceptor ethnicus ex optimis quibusque Sinensium libris extractus, et ex eorumdem sententiis concinnatus, lingua sinica

== External links and additional sources ==
- Cheney, David M. "Archdiocese of Santo Domingo". Catholic-Hierarchy.org. (for Chronology of Bishops) ^{[self-published]}
- Chow, Gabriel. "Metropolitan Archdiocese of Santo Domingo". GCatholic.org. (for Chronology of Bishops) ^{[self-published]}

Religious titles
Preceded by Juan de Escalante Turcios y Mendoza	Archbishop of Santo Domingo; 1682–1686	Succeeded by Fernando de Carvajal y Ribera
