= Gonzalo Maldonado (bishop) =

Spanish Roman Catholic bishop

The Most Reverend Gonzalo Maldonado
- Bishop of Ciudad Rodrigo
- Church: Catholic Church
- Diocese: Diocese of Ciudad Rodrigo
- In office: 1525–1530
- Predecessor: Pedro Portocarrero (archbishop)
- Successor: Pedro Fernández Manrique

Personal details
- Died: 29 June 1530 Ciudad Rodrigo, Spain

Gonzalo Maldonado (died 1530) was a Roman Catholic prelate who served as Bishop of Ciudad Rodrigo (1525–1530).

On 3 July 1525, during the papacy of Pope Clement VII, Maldonado was appointed as Bishop of Ciudad Rodrigo. He served in this post until his death on 29 June 1530.

== External links and additional sources ==
- Cheney, David M. "Diocese of Ciudad Rodrigo". Catholic-Hierarchy.org. (for Chronology of Bishops) ^{[self-published]}
- Chow, Gabriel. "Diocese of Ciudad Rodrigo". GCatholic.org. (for Chronology of Bishops) ^{[self-published]}

Catholic Church titles
Preceded by Pedro Portocarrero (archbishop)	Bishop of Ciudad Rodrigo; 1525–1530	Succeeded by Pedro Fernández Manrique
