= Jerónimo Manrique de Lara (bishop of Salamanca) =

Spanish Roman Catholic prelate

Most Reverend Jerónimo Manrique de Lara
- Church: Catholic Church
- Diocese: Diocese of Salamanca
- In office: 1579–1593
- Predecessor: Fernando Tricio Arenzana
- Successor: Pedro Junco Posada

Orders
- Consecration: 29 Mar 1579 by Martín de Córdoba Mendoza

Personal details
- Born: 1530 Córdoba, Andalusia, Spain
- Died: 19 Sep 1593 (age 63) Salamanca, Spain

Jerónimo Manrique de Lara or Jerónimo Manrique Figueroa (1530–1593) was a Roman Catholic prelate who served as Bishop of Salamanca (1579–1593).

== Biography ==
Jerónimo Manrique de Lara was born in Córdoba, Andalusia, Spain in 1530, the son of Manrique de Aguayo and Juana de Figueroa. On 9 Jan 1579, he was appointed during the papacy of Pope Gregory XIII as Bishop of Salamanca. On 29 Mar 1579, he was consecrated bishop by Martín de Córdoba Mendoza, Bishop of Córdoba, with Francisco Pacheco de Córdoba, Bishop of Málaga, and Diego de Simancas, Bishop of Zamora, serving as co-consecrators. He served as Bishop of Salamanca until his death on 19 Sep 1593. While bishop, he was the principal consecrator of Pedro Vélez Guevara, Bishop of Ciudad Rodrigo (1584); and Pedro Castro Quiñones, Archbishop of Granada (1590).

Catholic Church titles
Preceded by Fernando Tricio Arenzana	Bishop of Salamanca; 1579–1593	Succeeded by Pedro Junco Posada
