= Martín de Córdoba Mendoza =

Spanish bishop (1512-1581)

Most Reverend Martín de Córdoba Mendoza
- Bishop of Córdoba
- Church: Catholic Church
- In office: 1578–1581
- Predecessor: Bernardo de Fresneda
- Successor: Antonio Rodríguez de Pazos y Figueroa
- Previous posts: Bishop of Tortosa (1560–1574); Bishop of Plasencia (1574–1578)

Personal details
- Born: 3 November 1512 Córdoba, Spain
- Died: 5 June 1581 (age 68) Córdoba, Spain

Martín de Córdoba Mendoza, O.P. (1512–1581) was a Spanish Roman Catholic prelate who served as Bishop of Córdoba (1578–1581), Bishop of Plasencia (1574–1578), and Bishop of Tortosa (1560–1574).

== Biography ==
Martín de Córdoba Mendoza was born in Córdoba, Spain on 3 November 1512 and ordained a priest in the Order of Preachers. On 17 July 1560, he was appointed during the papacy of Pope Pius IV as Bishop of Tortosa. On 4 June 1574, he was appointed during the papacy of Pope Gregory XIII as Bishop of Plasencia. On 13 June 1578, he was appointed during the papacy of Pope Gregory XIII as Bishop of Córdoba. He served as Bishop of Córdoba until his death on 5 June 1581. While bishop, he was the principal consecrator of Lorenzo Figueroa Córdoba, Bishop of Sigüenza (1579); and Jerónimo Manrique de Lara, Bishop of Salamanca (1579).

== See also ==
- Catholic Church in Spain

== External links and additional sources ==
- Cheney, David M. "Diocese of Plasencia". Catholic-Hierarchy.org. (for Chronology of Bishops) ^{[self-published]}
- Chow, Gabriel. "Diocese of Plasencia (Spain)". GCatholic.org. (for Chronology of Bishops) ^{[self-published]}
- Cheney, David M. "Diocese of Córdoba". Catholic-Hierarchy.org. (for Chronology of Bishops) ^{[self-published]}
- Chow, Gabriel. "Diocese of Córdoba". GCatholic.org. (for Chronology of Bishops) ^{[self-published]}

Catholic Church titles
Preceded by Fernando de Loaces	Bishop of Tortosa; 1560–1574	Succeeded by Juan Izquierdo
Preceded by Pedro Ponce de León (bishop of Plasencia)	Bishop of Plasencia; 1574–1578	Succeeded by Francisco Tello Sandoval
Preceded by Bernardo de Fresneda	Bishop of Córdoba; 1578–1581	Succeeded by Antonio Rodríguez de Pazos y Figueroa
