= Pedro Fernández Manrique =

Spanish Roman Catholic bishop and cardinal

- Cardinal-Priest of Santi Giovanni e Paolo
- Church: Catholic Church
- In office: 21 May 1540 – 7 October 1540
- Predecessor: Afonso of Portugal
- Successor: Federigo Fregoso
- Other post: Bishop of Córdoba (1537-1540)
- Previous posts: Bishop of Ciudad Rodrigo (1530-1537); Bishop of the Canary Islands (1530)

Orders
- Created cardinal: 20 December 1538 by Pope Paul III

Personal details
- Born: c. 1500 Aguilar de Campoo, Kingdom of Castile, Crown of Castile
- Died: 7 October 1540 (aged 39–40) Rome, Papal States

Pedro Fernández Manrique (c. 1500–1540) was a Spanish Roman Catholic bishop and cardinal.

== Biography ==
Pedro Fernández Manrique was born in Aguilar de Campoo ca. 1500, the son of Luis Fernández Manrique, 2nd Marquis of Aguilar de Campoo and María Manrique de Lara, daughter of Pedro Manrique de Lara, 1st Duke of Nájera. His elder brother was Juan Fernández Manrique de Lara, Marqués de Aguilar de Campoo, Viceroy of Catalonia. He was educated at the University of Salamanca in the 1520s.

In 1525, Charles I of Spain named him maestrescula of the cathedral chapter of Salamanca Cathedral, a post that also made him chancellor of the University of Salamanca. The cathedral chapter, however, elected Martín de Espinosa, an auditor of the Roman Rota, for the same position. Espinosa ultimately prevailed in the dispute over this double appointment. In compensation, Charles I of Spain in 1530 made him major chaplain of the Chapel of the New Monarchs in the Cathedral of Toledo.

Six months later, Charles nominated him to be Bishop of Canarias and he was elected as bishop on 22 June 1530. He was transferred to the see of Ciudad Rodrigo on 14 December 1530. On 11 April 1537 he was transferred to the see of Córdoba, entering the diocese on 2 March 1538. He participated in the Cortes held in Toledo beginning on 15 October 1538.

At the request of King Charles I, Pope Paul III created Fernández Manrique a cardinal priest in the consistory of 20 December 1538. He received the red hat on 26 April 1540 and the titular church of Santi Giovanni e Paolo on 21 May 1540.

He died of the plague in Rome on 7 October 1540. He was temporarily buried in Santa Maria in Aracoeli, and his remains were later transferred to Spain and reburied.

Catholic Church titles
Preceded by Luis Cabeza de Vaca	Bishop of Islas Canarias; 1530	Succeeded by Juan de Salamanca
Preceded by Gonzalo Maldonado (bishop)	Bishop of Ciudad Rodrigo; 1530–1537	Succeeded by Pedro Pacheco de Villena
Preceded by Juan Álvarez de Toledo	Bishop of Córdoba; 1537–1540	Succeeded by Leopoldo de Austria
Preceded by Afonso de Portugal	Cardinal-Priest of Santi Giovanni e Paolo; 1538–1540	Succeeded by Federico Fregóso
