= Francisco de Navarra y Hualde =

Most Reverend Francisco de Navarra y Hualde
- Archbishop of Valencia
- Church: Catholic Church
- Diocese: Roman Catholic Archdiocese of Valencia
- Predecessor: Tomás García y Martínez
- Successor: Acisclo de Moya y Contreras
- Previous posts: Bishop of Ciudad Rodrigo; Bishop of Badajoz

Personal details
- Born: 1498 Tafalla, Navarre
- Died: April 16, 1563 (age 65)

Francisco de Navarra y Hualde (1498 – April 16, 1563) was a Roman Catholic prelate who served as Archbishop of Valencia (1556–1563), Bishop of Badajoz (1545–1556), and Bishop of Ciudad Rodrigo (1542–1545) in emperor Charles V's Spain.

== Biography ==
Francisco de Navarra y Hualde was born in Tafalla, Kingdom of Navarre, in 1498. He was the son of Pedro, Marshall of Navarre, and a lady from Tafalla surnamed Hualde. As a young man he was affected by the conquest of Navarre. During the Siege of Hondarribia (1522-1524), he was listed in December 1523 along with his brother Pedro among the Navarrese loyalists not spared by the Emperor Charles V's pardon. Eventually, following the general pardon decreed by the emperor Charles V that paved the ground to the end of the Siege of Hondarribia, he was appointed prior of Roncesvalles, later removed from Navarre.

On May 22, 1542, Pope Paul III appointed him Bishop of Ciudad Rodrigo. On December 14, 1545, he was appointed by Pope Paul III, Bishop of Badajoz. On May 4, 1556, Pope Paul IV appointed him Archbishop of Valencia and he was installed on Jun 22, 1556. He served as Bishop of Badajoz until his death on April 16, 1563. While bishop, he was the principal co-consecrator of Tomás Garcia Martinez, Archbishop of Valencia (1544). He, along with his fellow Navarrese Martin Azpilcueta, defended Bartolome Carranza against the charges of Spanish Inquisition and the intent of King Philip II starting 1558.

== External links and additional sources ==
- Cheney, David M. "Archdiocese of Valencia". Catholic-Hierarchy.org. (for Chronology of Bishops) ^{[self-published]}
- Chow, Gabriel. "Metropolitan Archdiocese of Valencia". GCatholic.org. (for Chronology of Bishops) ^{[self-published]}
- Cheney, David M. "Archdiocese of Mérida–Badajoz". Catholic-Hierarchy.org. (for Chronology of Bishops) ^{[self-published]}
- Chow, Gabriel. "Metropolitan Archdiocese of Mérida–Badajoz". GCatholic.org. (for Chronology of Bishops) ^{[self-published]}
- Cheney, David M. "Diocese of Ciudad Rodrigo". Catholic-Hierarchy.org. (for Chronology of Bishops) ^{[self-published]}
- Chow, Gabriel. "Diocese of Ciudad Rodrigo". GCatholic.org. (for Chronology of Bishops) ^{[self-published]}

Catholic Church titles
Preceded by Antonio Ramírez de Haro	Bishop of Ciudad Rodrigo; 1542–1545	Succeeded by Juan Aceres
Preceded by Jerónimo Suárez Maldonado	Bishop of Badajoz; 1545–1556	Succeeded by Cristóbal Rojas Sandoval
Preceded by Tomás Garcia Martinez	Archbishop of Valencia; 1556–1563	Succeeded by Acisclo de Moya y Contreras
