= Diego de Covarrubias y Leyva =

Spanish jurist and Catholic prelate (1512–1577)

Most Reverend Diego de Covarrubias y Leyva
- Archbishop of Cuenca
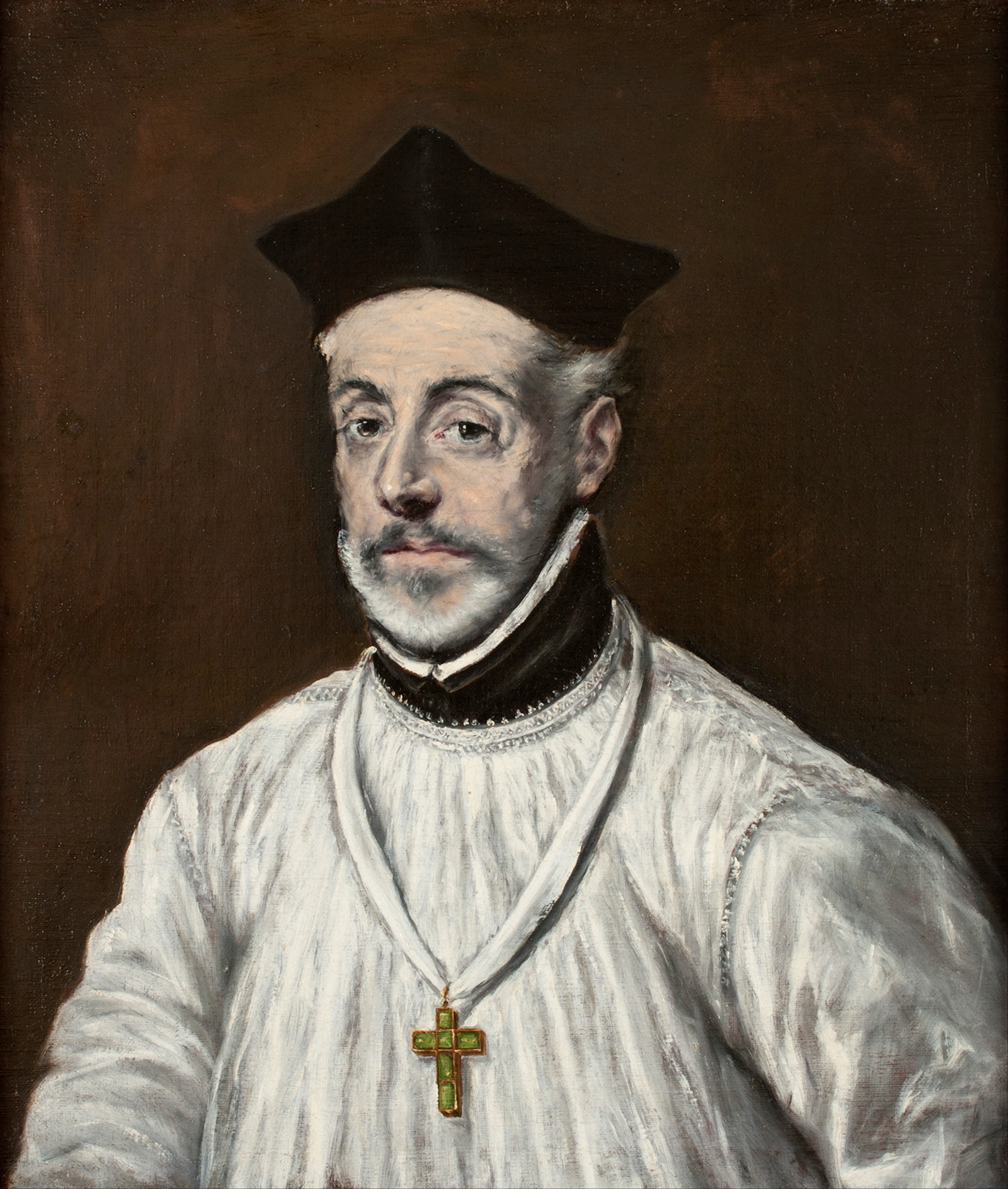
- Diego de Covarrubias, by El Greco
- Church: Catholic Church
- Diocese: Diocese of Cuenca
- Predecessor: Gaspar de Quiroga y Vela
- Successor: Rodrigo de Castro Osorio
- Previous posts: Archbishop of Santo Domingo (1556-1560); Archbishop of Ciudad Rodrigo (1560-1564); Archbishop of Segovia (1564-1577)

Orders
- Consecration: April 28, 1560 by Fernando de Valdés y Salas

Personal details
- Born: July 25, 1512 Toledo, Spain
- Died: September 27, 1577 (age 65) Madrid, Spain
- Education: University of Salamanca

Diego de Covarrubias y Leyva (July 25, 1512 – September 27, 1577) was a Spanish jurist, professor, and Catholic prelate who served as Archbishop of Cuenca (1577-1577), Archbishop of Segovia (1564-1577), Archbishop of Ciudad Rodrigo (1560-1564), and Archbishop of Santo Domingo (1556-1560). Covarrubias was a member of the School of Salamanca, having studied under Francisco de Vitoria and Martín de Azpilcueta.

== Life ==
=== Early years ===
Covarruvias was born in Toledo on 25 July 1512. His father was Alonso de Covarrubias (1488-1570), an architect who designed the New Kings chapel of the Cathedral of Toledo. Diego's younger brother, Antonio de Covarrubias (1514/24-1602), would be a professor of law at the University of Salamanca and served as consejero of Castile.

Diego de Covarrubias was educated at the University of Salamanca, where he studied canon law under Martín de Azpilcueta and theology under Francisco de Vitoria and Domingo de Soto. At the age of twenty-one, Covarruvias was appointed professor of canon law in the University of Salamanca. Later on he was entrusted with the work of reforming that institution, already venerable for its age, and the legislation which he drew up looking to this end remained in effect long after his time.

He was widely recognized for his expertise in legal scholarship and was referred to by some of his contemporaries as the "Bartolus of Spain". His legal writings were noted for their clarity and effective use of language. In addition to law, he demonstrated knowledge of several related fields that contributed to his scholarly work. According to historical accounts, during his tenure as professor at the University of Oviedo at the age of twenty-six, he had studied and annotated a large portion of the university library's collection.

=== Episcopate ===
On April 24, 1556, Covarruvias was designated by Charles V for the archiepiscopal see of San Domingo in the New World, whither, however, he never went. On January 26, 1560, he was appointed Bishop of Ciudad Rodrigo in Spain. On April 28, 1560, he was consecrated bishop by Fernando de Valdés y Salas, Archbishop of Sevilla with Martín Pérez de Ayala, Bishop of Guadix, and Diego de los Cobos Molina, Bishop of Ávila, as co-consecrators. In this capacity he attended the Council of Trent, where, according to the statement of his nephew, conjointly with Cardinal Ugo Buoncompagni (afterwards Gregory XIII), he was authorized to formulate the reform-decrees (De Reformatione) of the council. Pressure of other duties having prevented Buoncompagni from doing his part of the work, so the task devolved upon Covarruvias alone. The text of these decrees, therefore, formally approved by the council, we apparently owe to him.

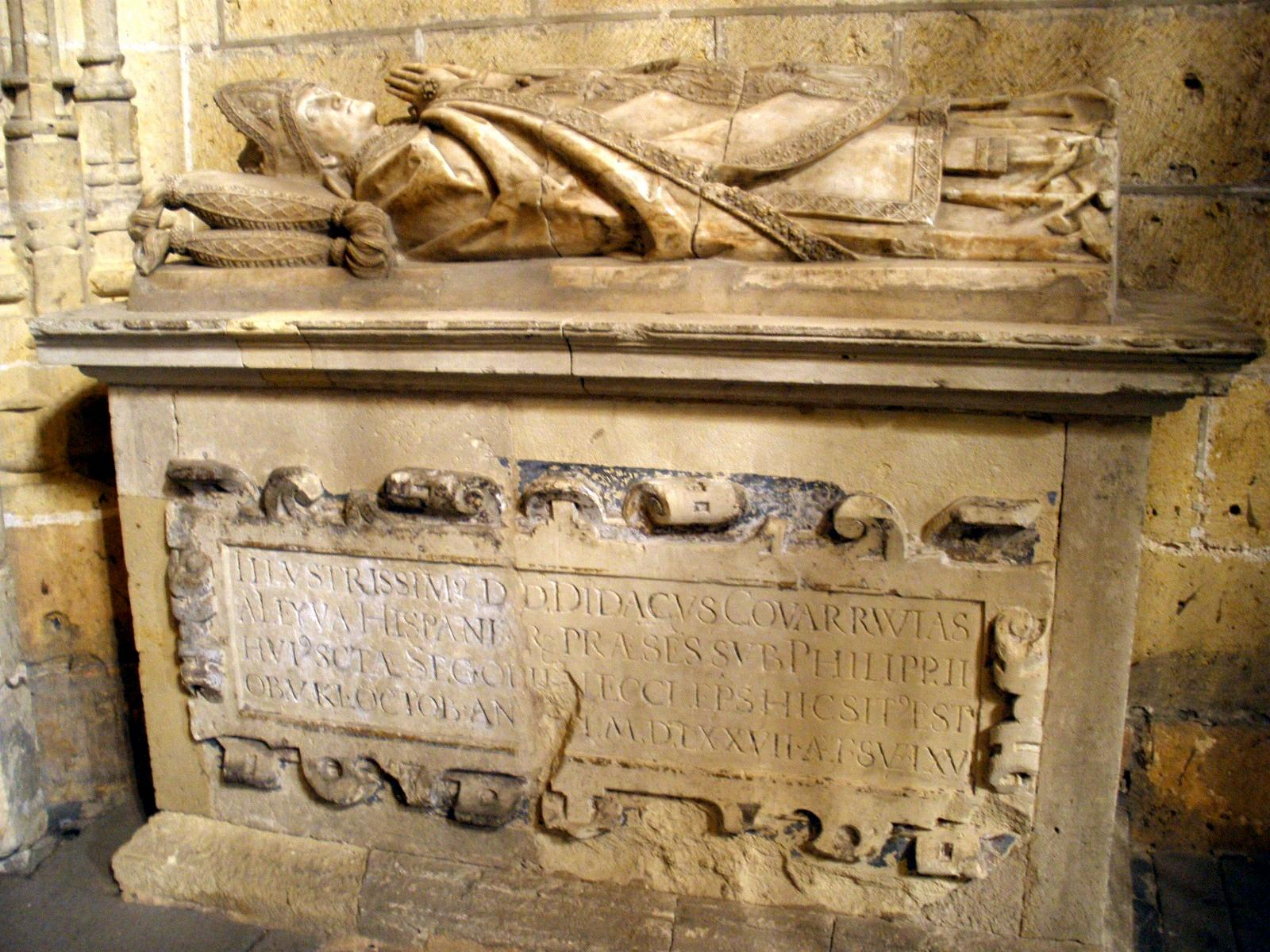
Tomb in Segovia Cathedral

Having returned to Spain, Covarruvias was in 1565 transferred to the See of Segovia. Up to this time his extraordinary talents had been discovered in matters more or less scholastic only; they were hereafter to reveal themselves also in practical affairs of state. Appointed in 1572 a member of the Council of Castile, he was two years later raised to the presidency of the Council of State. In the discharge of this office he was eminently successful. While president of the Council of State he was nominated by Philip II for the Bishopric of Cuenca, but death prevented him from assuming his duties. Covarruvias died in Madrid, on 27 September 1577. While Bishop, he was the principal co-consecrator of Pedro de la Peña, Bishop of Quito.

He was buried in a marble sarcophagus in Segovia Cathedral, near the old entrance to the cathedral built by the Catholic Monarchs, which today leads to the cloister.

== Doctrine ==
Considered as the greatest canonist of 16th century, his opinions are often quoted by Grotius and Dietrich Reinkingk.

Very influential within the School of Salamanca, he is very often quoted by the members of this movement in their reflections on the law of contracts, whether it is a theory of the vice of duress by Lessius, of good faith, the concepts of just price and injury or even on the validity of a contract with a prostitute. However, he rejects the idea of a contractual consensualism in matters of civil law, defended by Fortunius Garcia, and prefers to consider that the restrictions on contractual freedom are justified by the public interest or the common good.

== Works ==
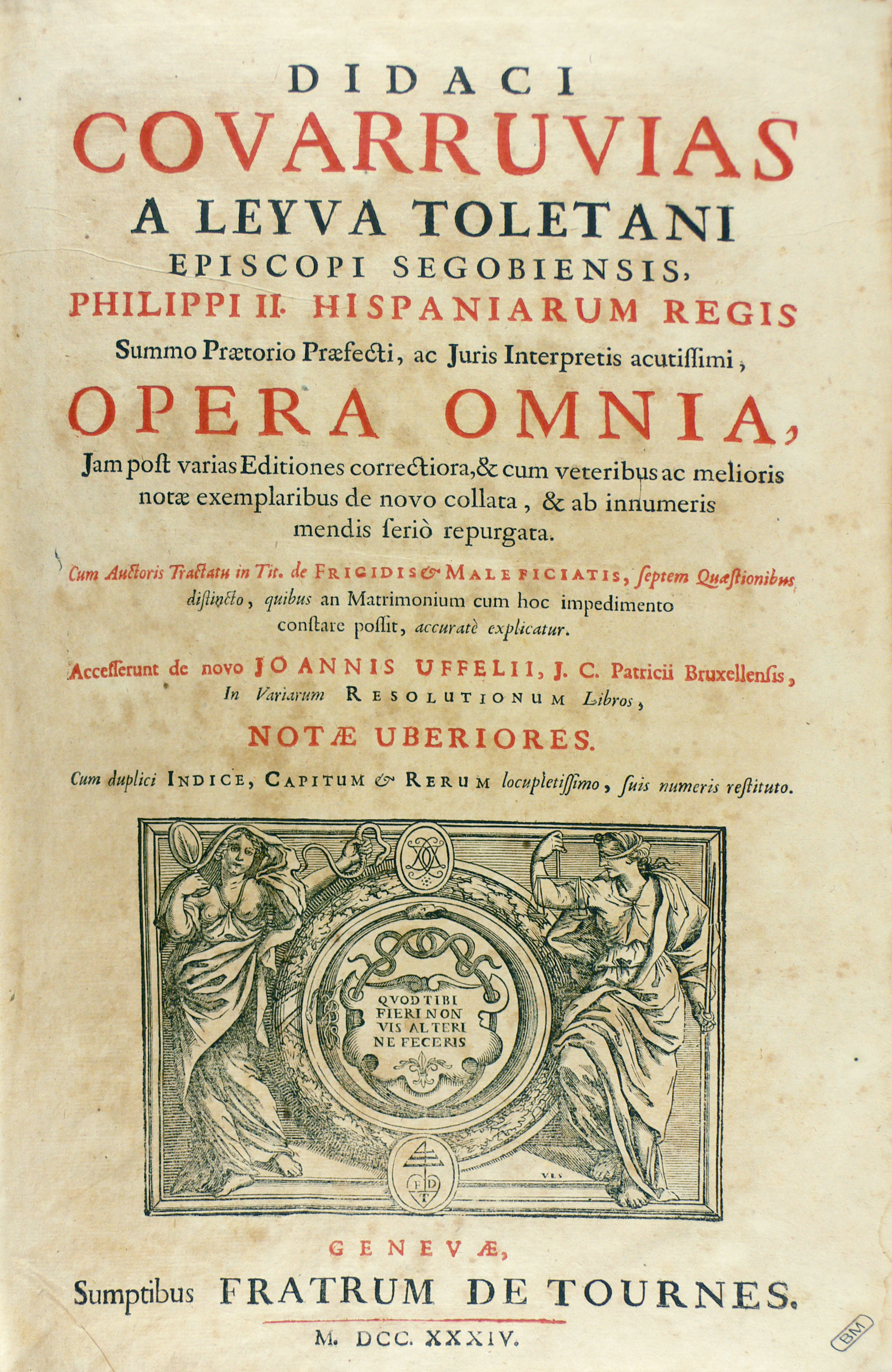
Opera omnia, 1734 (Milano, Fondazione Mansutti).

The principal work of Covarruvias is his Variarum resolutionum ex jure pontificio regio et cæsareo libri IV. He wrote also on testaments, betrothal and marriage, oaths, excommunication, prescription, restitution, etc. Quite distinct in character from his other productions is his numismatic treatise, Veterum numismatum collatio cum his quæ modo expenduntur, etc. (1594). His complete works have been several times edited, the Antwerp edition (5 vols., 1762) being the best. Among his manuscripts have been found notes on the Council of Trent, a treatise on punishments (De poenis) and an historical tract, Catalogo de los reyes de España y de otras cosas, etc.

== External links and additional sources ==
- Decock, Wim (2013). Theologians and Contract Law. The Moral Transformation of the Ius commune (ca. 1500-1650). Leiden-Boston: Martinus Nijhoff Publishers. p. 723. ISBN 978-90-04-23285-3.
- Cheney, David M. "Archdiocese of Santo Domingo". Catholic-Hierarchy.org. (for Chronology of Bishops) ^{[self-published]}
- Chow, Gabriel. "Metropolitan Archdiocese of Santo Domingo". GCatholic.org. (for Chronology of Bishops) ^{[self-published]}
- Cheney, David M. "Diocese of Ciudad Rodrigo". Catholic-Hierarchy.org. (for Chronology of Bishops) ^{[self-published]}
- Chow, Gabriel. "Diocese of Ciudad Rodrigo". GCatholic.org. (for Chronology of Bishops) ^{[self-published]}
- Cheney, David M. "Diocese of Segovia". Catholic-Hierarchy.org. (for Chronology of Bishops) ^{[self-published]}
- Chow, Gabriel. "Diocese of Segovia (Spain)". GCatholic.org. (for Chronology of Bishops) ^{[self-published]}
- Melody, John Webster (1913). "Diego Covarruvias" . In Herbermann, Charles (ed.). Catholic Encyclopedia. New York: Robert Appleton Company.

Religious titles
| Preceded by Alfonso de Fuenmayor | Archbishop of Santo Domingo; 1556-1560 | Succeeded by Juan Salcedo (bishop) |
| Preceded by Pedro Ponce de León (bishop of Plasencia) | Archbishop of Ciudad Rodrigo; 1560-1564 | Succeeded by Diego de Simancas |
| Preceded by Martín Pérez de Ayala | Archbishop of Segovia; 1564-1577 | Succeeded by Gregorio Antonio Gallo de Andrade |
| Preceded by Gaspar de Quiroga y Vela | Archbishop of Cuenca; 1577-1577 | Succeeded by Rodrigo de Castro Osorio |
