= Agustín Antolínez =

Catholic archbishop of Santiago de Compostela from 1624 to 1626

Most Reverend Agustín Antolínez
- Archbishop of Santiago de Compostela
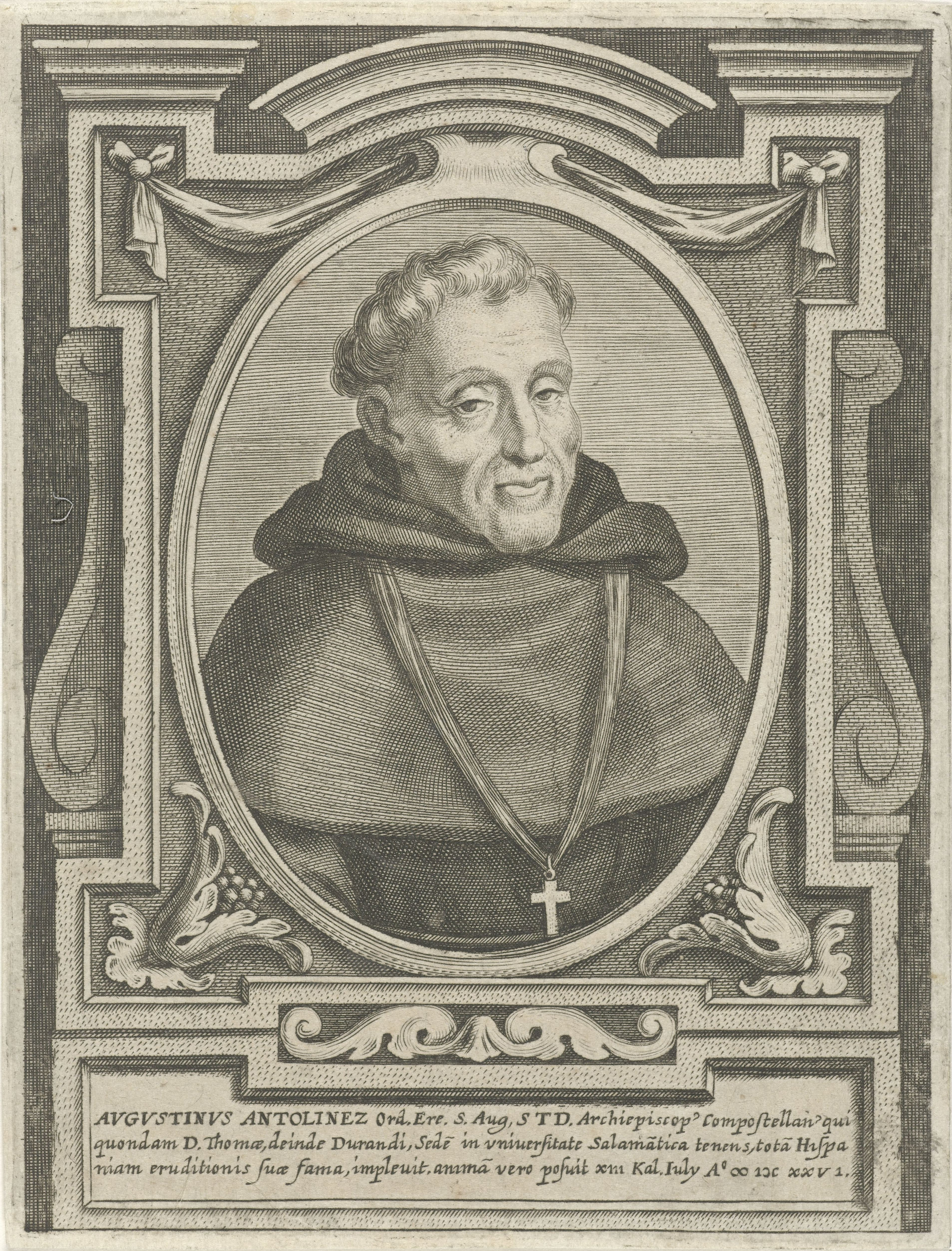
- Church: Catholic Church
- Archdiocese: Archdiocese of Santiago de Compostela
- In office: 1624–1626
- Predecessor: Luis Fernández de Córdoba
- Successor: José González Díez
- Previous post: Bishop of Ciudad Rodrigo (1623–1624)

Orders
- Consecration: 24 August 1623 by Luis Fernández de Córdoba

Personal details
- Born: 6 December 1554 Valladolid, Spain
- Died: 22 May 1622 (age 71) Santiago de Compostela, Spain

Agustín Antolínez, O.S.A. (6 December 1554 – 19 June 1626) was a Roman Catholic prelate who served as Archbishop of Santiago de Compostela (1624–1626) and Bishop of Ciudad Rodrigo (1623–1624).

== Biography ==
Agustín Antolínez was born in Valladolid, Spain and ordained a priest in the Order of Saint Augustine. On 10 May 1623, he was appointed during the papacy of Pope Gregory XV as Bishop of Ciudad Rodrigo. On 24 August 1623, he was consecrated bishop by Luis Fernández de Córdoba, Archbishop of Santiago de Compostela, with Juan Bravo Lagunas, Bishop of Ugento, and Antonio de Gouvea, Titular Bishop of Cyrene, serving as co-consecrators. On 1 July 1624, he was appointed during the papacy of Pope Urban VIII as Archbishop of Santiago de Compostela. He served as Archbishop of Santiago de Compostela until his death on 19 June 1626.

== Writings and bibliography ==
Lazcano, Rafael, Tesauro Agustiniano. 2: Álvarez de Toledo - Asensio Aguirre, p. 183-196. ISBN 978-84-09-03057-6

== External links and additional sources ==
- Cheney, David M. "Archdiocese of Santiago de Compostela". Catholic-Hierarchy.org. (for Chronology of Bishops) ^{[self-published]}
- Chow, Gabriel. "Archdiocese of Santiago de Compostela (Spain)". GCatholic.org. (for Chronology of Bishops) ^{[self-published]}
- Cheney, David M. "Diocese of Ciudad Rodrigo". Catholic-Hierarchy.org. (for Chronology of Bishops) ^{[self-published]}
- Chow, Gabriel. "Diocese of Ciudad Rodrigo". GCatholic.org. (for Chronology of Bishops) ^{[self-published]}

Catholic Church titles
Preceded by Francisco de Arriba	Bishop of Ciudad Rodrigo; 1623–1624	Succeeded by Martín Fernández Portocarrero
Preceded by Luis Fernández de Córdoba	Archbishop of Santiago de Compostela; 1624–1626	Succeeded by José González Díez
