= José González Blázquez =

Spanish Roman Catholic prelate

Most Reverend José González Blázquez
- Church: Catholic Church
- Diocese: Diocese of Plasencia
- In office: 1695–1698
- Predecessor: Juan de Villacé y Vozmediano
- Successor: Bartolomé de Ocampo y Mata
- Previous post: Bishop of Ciudad Rodrigo (1688–1695)

Orders
- Consecration: 1688 by Fernando de Carvajal y Ribera

Personal details
- Born: 1630 Escurial, Spain
- Died: 9 December 1698 (age 68) Plasencia, Spain

José González Blázquez, O. de M. (1630–1698) was a Roman Catholic prelate who served as Bishop of Plasencia (1695–1698) and Bishop of Ciudad Rodrigo (1688–1695).

== Biography ==
José González Blázquez was born in Escurial, Spain in 1630 and ordained a priest in the Order of the Blessed Virgin Mary of Mercy. On 31 May 1688, he was appointed during the papacy of Pope Innocent XI as Bishop of Ciudad Rodrigo. In 1688, he was consecrated bishop by Fernando de Carvajal y Ribera, Archbishop of Santo Domingo. On 24 January 1695, he was appointed during the papacy of Pope Innocent XII as Bishop of Plasencia. He served as Bishop of Plasencia until his death on 9 December 1698.

== External links and additional sources ==
- Cheney, David M. "Diocese of Ciudad Rodrigo". Catholic-Hierarchy.org. (for Chronology of Bishops) ^{[self-published]}
- Chow, Gabriel. "Diocese of Ciudad Rodrigo". GCatholic.org. (for Chronology of Bishops) ^{[self-published]}
- Cheney, David M. "Diocese of Plasencia". Catholic-Hierarchy.org. (for Chronology of Bishops) ^{[self-published]}
- Chow, Gabriel. "Diocese of Plasencia (Spain)". GCatholic.org. (for Chronology of Bishops) ^{[self-published]}

Catholic Church titles
Preceded by Sebastián Catalán	Bishop of Ciudad Rodrigo; 1688–1695	Succeeded by Francisco Manuel de Zúñiga Sotomayor y Mendoza
Preceded by Juan de Villacé y Vozmediano	Bishop of Plasencia; 1695–1698	Succeeded by Bartolomé de Ocampo y Mata
