= Diego de Simancas =

Roman Catholic prelate

Most Reverend Diego de Simancas
- Bishop of Zamora
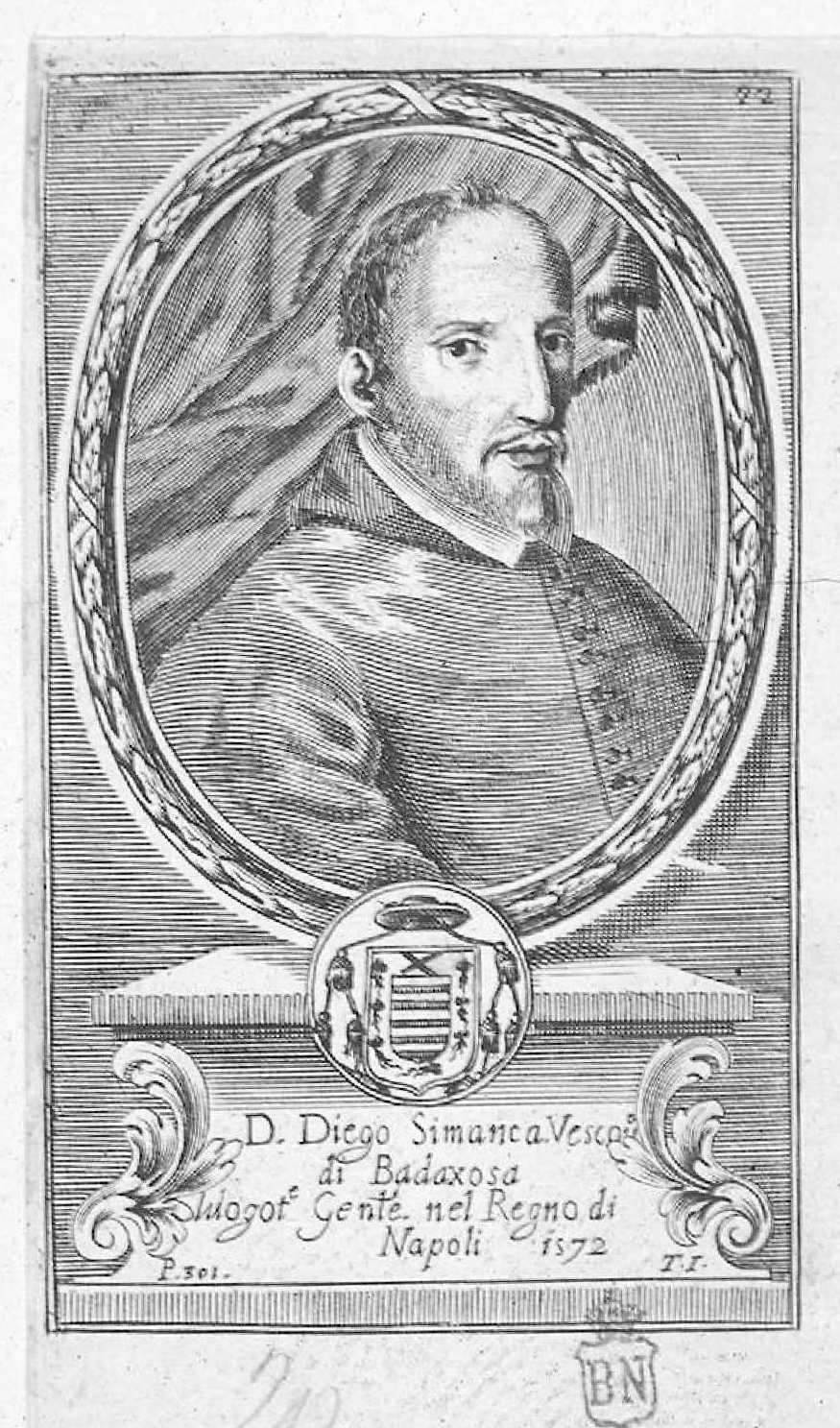
- Diego Simancas. Anonymous intaglio engraving collected in Teatro eroico, e politico de'governi de'Vicere del Regno de Napoli, by Domenico Antonio Parrino, Naples, 1692-1695.
- Church: Catholic Church
- Diocese: Diocese of Zamora
- In office: 1578–1583
- Predecessor: Rodrigo de Castro Osorio
- Successor: Juan Ruiz Agüero
- Previous posts: Bishop of Ciudad Rodrigo (1564–1568); Bishop of Badajoz (1568–1578)

Orders
- Consecration: 1 April 1565

Personal details
- Born: Spain
- Died: 16 October 1583 Zamora, Spain

Diego de Simancas or Diego de Simancas Simancas (died 1583) was a Roman Catholic prelate who served as Bishop of Zamora (1578–1583), Bishop of Badajoz (1568–1578), and Bishop of Ciudad Rodrigo (1564–1568).

== Biography ==
Diego de Simancas was born in Spain, the son of Diego de Simancas Bretón and María de Simancas and the brother of Juan de Simancas Simancas, Bishop of Cartagena. On 15 December 1564, he was appointed during the papacy of Pope Pius IV as Bishop of Ciudad Rodrigo. On 1 April 1565, he was consecrated bishop. On 3 December 1568, he was appointed during the papacy of Pope Pius V as Bishop of Badajoz. On 13 June 1578, he was appointed during the papacy of Pope Gregory XIII as Bishop of Zamora. He served as Bishop of Zamora until his death on 16 October 1583.

== Episcopal succession ==
While bishop, he was the principal co-consecrator of:

- Antonio Rodríguez de Pazos y Figueroa, Bishop of Patti (1568);
- Francisco Trujillo García, Bishop of León (1578);
- Lorenzo Figueroa Córdoba, Bishop of Sigüenza (1579); and
- Jerónimo Manrique de Lara, Bishop of Salamanca (1579).

== See also ==
- Catholic Church in Spain

== External links and additional sources ==
- Cheney, David M. "Diocese of Ciudad Rodrigo". Catholic-Hierarchy.org. (for Chronology of Bishops) ^{[self-published]}
- Chow, Gabriel. "Diocese of Ciudad Rodrigo". GCatholic.org. (for Chronology of Bishops) ^{[self-published]}
- Cheney, David M. "Archdiocese of Mérida–Badajoz". Catholic-Hierarchy.org. (for Chronology of Bishops) ^{[self-published]}
- Chow, Gabriel. "Metropolitan Archdiocese of Mérida–Badajoz". GCatholic.org. (for Chronology of Bishops) ^{[self-published]}
- Cheney, David M. "Diocese of Zamora". Catholic-Hierarchy.org. (for Chronology of Bishops) ^{[self-published]}
- Chow, Gabriel. "Diocese of Zamora (Spain)". GCatholic.org. (for Chronology of Bishops) ^{[self-published]}

Catholic Church titles
Preceded by Diego de Covarrubias y Leiva	Bishop of Ciudad Rodrigo; 1564–1568	Succeeded by Andrés Pérez (bishop)
Preceded by Juan de Ribera	Bishop of Badajoz; 1568–1578	Succeeded by Diego Gómez de Lamadrid
Preceded by Rodrigo de Castro Osorio	Bishop of Zamora; 1578–1583	Succeeded by Juan Ruiz Agüero
