= Leopoldo de Austria =

Illegitimate son of Maximilian I, Holy Roman Emperor

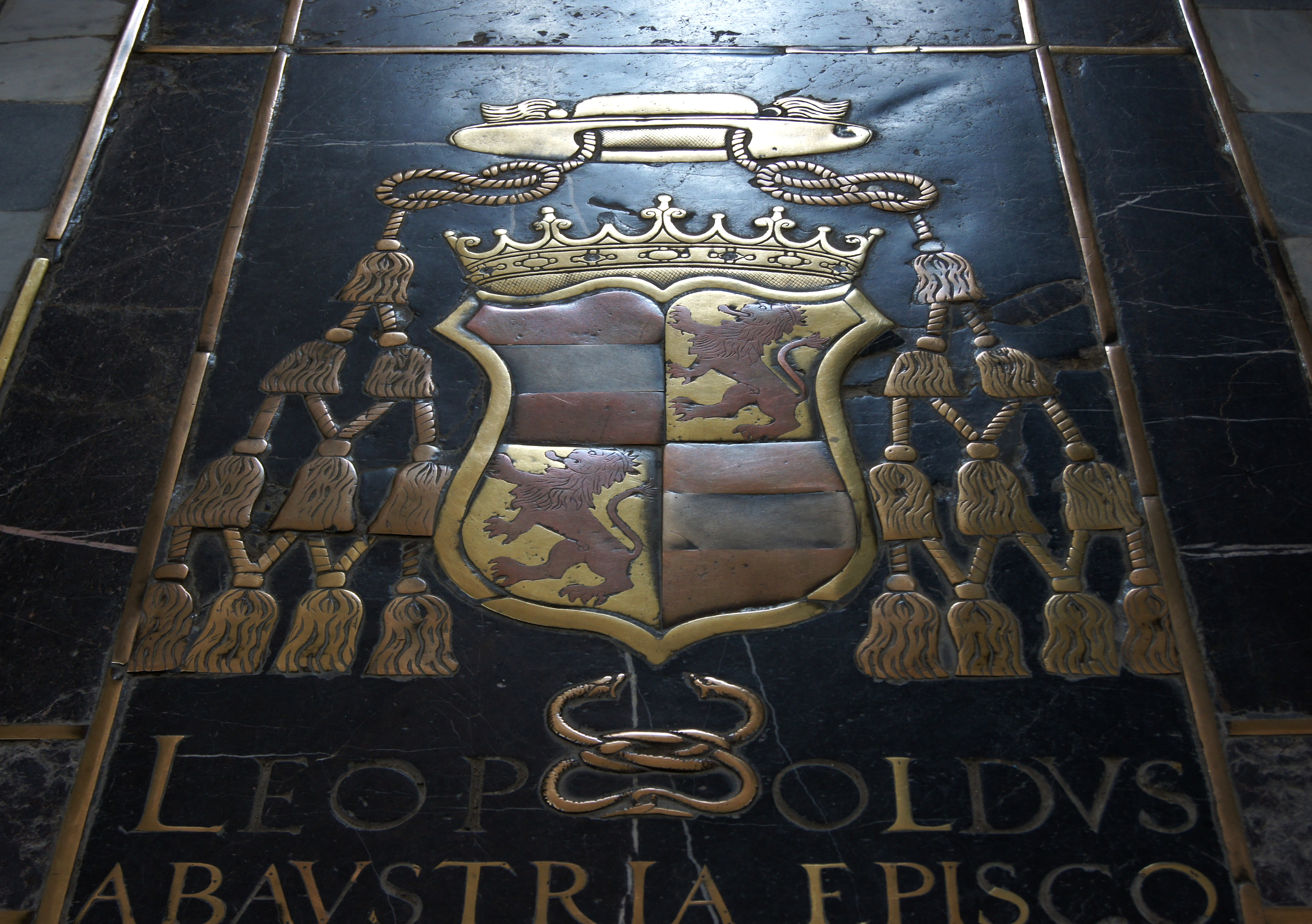
His grave in the Cordoba Cathedral.

Leopoldo de Austria (between 1513 and 1515, in Austria – 27 September 1557, in Cordoba) was an illegitimate son of Maximilian I, Holy Roman Emperor and Bishop of Cordoba (1541–1557).

== Biography ==
Leopoldo de Austria was born in Austria as illegitimate son of Maximilian I, Holy Roman Emperor and Anna von Helfenstein, who bore him seven other children.

He received a humanist education and was sent to Spain, where his nephew Charles, Holy Roman Emperor had become King. Between 1536 and 1537, he was the Rector of the Salamanca University. In 1541, he was appointed as Bishop of Cordoba during the papacy of Pope Paul III as successor of Pedro Fernández Manrique.

He served as Bishop of Cordoba until his death on 27 September 1557.

He had an illegitimate son Maximilian of Austria (1555–1614), who became Archbishop of Santiago de Compostela, Bishop of Segovia and Bishop of Cádiz.
