= Juan Fernández Manrique de Lara, Marqués de Aguilar de Campoo =

Spanish Viceroy of Catalonia and Grandee of Spain

Juan Fernández Manrique de Lara (Castile, c. 1490 – Barcelona, 14 October 1553), III Marquis of Aguilar de Campoo, V Count of Castañeda, was a Spanish Viceroy of Catalonia and Grandee of Spain.

== Biography ==
He was the eldest son of Luis Fernández Manrique de Lara, II Marquis of Aguilar de Campoo (died 1534), and Ana Pimentel y Enríquez.
Cardinal Pedro Fernández Manrique was his younger brother.

He first married María de Luna y Sandoval and then Blanca Pimentel de Velasco, daughter of the Count-Duke of Benavente. From his second marriage he had six children, including Luis Fernández Manrique de Lara y Pimentel, who succeeded him in the Marquisate.

In 1535, he accompanied Emperor Charles V in his Conquest of Tunis, and distinguished himself by his courage and military expertise. He was named Chief chancellor of Castile, Chief hunter (Cazador mayor) of Charles V. He was also Spanish Ambassador to the Holy See between 1537 and 1540.

On 10 July 1543, he was appointed Viceroy of Catalonia, a post he would hold for 10 years until his death. His viceroyalty coincided with the Regency of Prince Philip, the future Philip II, and was the first appointment in a new policy of appointing Viceroys in Catalonia from the high Castilian aristocracy. As viceroy, he was confronted with a new Franco-Spanish War and raids by Turkish pirates, which permanently plagued the Mediterranean coast. Hayreddin Barbarossa, and then his successor Dragut, attacked the coasts of Cadaqués, Palamós and Rosas during his reign.

After his stay in the north of Catalonia to defend Rosas, he fell seriously ill and died in October 1553. After the solemn burial ceremony organized by Hernando de Aragón, the Marquis of Aguilar was buried in the extramural monastery of Jesús de Barcelona.
