= Francisco Manuel de Zúñiga Sotomayor y Mendoza =

Spanish Roman Catholic prelate

Most Reverend Francisco Manuel de Zúñiga Sotomayor y Mendoza
- Bishop of Ciudad Rodrigo
- Church: Catholic Church
- Diocese: Diocese of Ciudad Rodrigo
- In office: 1695–1712
- Predecessor: José González Blázquez
- Successor: José Díez Santos de San Pedro

Orders
- Consecration: Federico Caccia by 19 June 1695

Personal details
- Born: 11 October 1646 San Esteban de la Sierra, Spain
- Died: 14 December 1712 (age 66) Ciudad Rodrigo, Spain

Francisco Manuel de Zúñiga Sotomayor y Mendoza, O.S.A. (1646–1712) was a Roman Catholic prelate who served as Bishop of Ciudad Rodrigo (1695–1712).

== Biography ==
Francisco Manuel de Zúñiga Sotomayor y Mendoza was born in San Esteban de la Sierra, Spain, on 11 October 1646 and ordained a priest in the Order of Saint Augustine. On 21 March 1695, he was appointed by Pope Innocent XII as Bishop of Ciudad Rodrigo. On 19 June 1695, he was consecrated bishop by Federico Caccia, Titular Archbishop of Laodicea in Phrygia, with Antonio Pascual, Bishop of Vic, and Francisco Zapata Vera y Morales, Titular Bishop of Dara, serving as co-consecrators. He served as Bishop of Ciudad Rodrigo until his death on 14 December 1712.

== External links and additional sources ==
- Cheney, David M. "Diocese of Ciudad Rodrigo". Catholic-Hierarchy.org. (for Chronology of Bishops) ^{[self-published]}
- Chow, Gabriel. "Diocese of Ciudad Rodrigo". GCatholic.org. (for Chronology of Bishops) ^{[self-published]}

Catholic Church titles
| Preceded by José González Blázquez | Bishop of Ciudad Rodrigo; 1695–1712 | Succeeded by José Díez Santos de San Pedro |
