= Pedro Portocarrero (archbishop of Granada) =

Spanish Roman Catholic prelate

Most Reverend Pedro Portocarrero
- Archbishop of Granada
- Church: Catholic Church
- Archdiocese: Archdiocese of Granada
- In office: 1525–1526
- Predecessor: Francisco Herrera Ruesta
- Successor: Pedro Ramírez de Alba
- Previous post: Bishop of Ciudad Rodrigo (1523–1525)

Orders
- Consecration: 1524

Personal details
- Born: Spain
- Died: 5 June 1526 Granada, Spain

Pedro Portocarrero (died 1526) was a Roman Catholic prelate who served as Archbishop of Granada (1525–1526) and Bishop of Ciudad Rodrigo (1523–1525).

== Biography ==
Pedro Portocarrero was born in Spain. On 31 Dec 1523, he was appointed during the papacy of Pope Clement VII as Bishop of Ciudad Rodrigo. In 1524, he was consecrated bishop. On 26 Jun 1525, he was appointed during the papacy of Pope Clement VII as Archbishop of Granada. He served as Archbishop of Granada until his death on 5 Jun 1526.

== External links and additional sources ==
- Cheney, David M. "Diocese of Ciudad Rodrigo". Catholic-Hierarchy.org. (for Chronology of Bishops) ^{[self-published]}
- Chow, Gabriel. "Diocese of Ciudad Rodrigo". GCatholic.org. (for Chronology of Bishops) ^{[self-published]}
- Cheney, David M. "Archdiocese of Granada". Catholic-Hierarchy.org. (for Chronology of Bishops) ^{[self-published]}
- Chow, Gabriel. "Metropolitan Archdiocese of Granada(Spain)". GCatholic.org. (for Chronology of Bishops) ^{[self-published]}

Catholic Church titles
Preceded by Juan Pardo de Tavera	Bishop of Ciudad Rodrigo; 1523–1525	Succeeded by Gonzalo Maldonado (bishop)
Preceded by Francisco Herrera Ruesta	Archbishop of Granada; 1525–1526	Succeeded by Pedro Ramírez de Alba
