= Andrés Pérez (bishop) =

Spanish Roman Catholic bishop

Most Reverend Andrés Pérez
- Bishop of Ciudad Rodrigo
- Church: Catholic Church
- Diocese: Diocese of Ciudad Rodrigo
- In office: 1568–1583
- Predecessor: Diego de Simancas
- Successor: Pedro Vélez Guevara

Orders
- Consecration: 1569

Personal details
- Died: 1583 Ciudad Rodrigo, Spain

Andrés Pérez (died 1583) was a Roman Catholic prelate who served as Bishop of Ciudad Rodrigo (1568–1583).

== Biography ==
On 10 Dec 1568, Andrés Pérez was appointed during the papacy of Pope Pius V as Bishop of Ciudad Rodrigo. In 1569, he was consecrated bishop. He served as Bishop of Ciudad Rodrigo until his death in 1583.

== External links and additional sources ==
- Cheney, David M. "Diocese of Ciudad Rodrigo". Catholic-Hierarchy.org. (for Chronology of Bishops) ^{[self-published]}
- Chow, Gabriel. "Diocese of Ciudad Rodrigo". GCatholic.org. (for Chronology of Bishops) ^{[self-published]}

Catholic Church titles
Preceded by Diego de Simancas	Bishop of Ciudad Rodrigo; 1568–1583	Succeeded by Pedro Vélez Guevara
