= Juan Ponce de León II =

Puerto Rican politician (1524–1591)

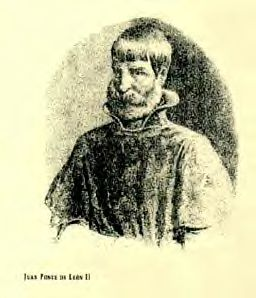

Acting Governor of Puerto Rico
- In office April 1579 – April 1580
- Monarch: Philip II
- Viceroy of New Spain: Martín Enríquez de Almanza
- Preceded by: Francisco De Obando Y Mexia
- Succeeded by: Jerónimo De Agüero Campuzano

Personal details
- Born: 1524 San Juan, Puerto Rico, New Spain
- Died: 1591 (aged 66–67) San Juan, Captaincy General of Puerto Rico, Spanish Empire
- Spouse: Doña Isabel de Loayza
- Relations: Juan Ponce de León (grandfather); Juan Ponce de León y Loayza; Luis (sons); Isabel and María (daughters)

Juan Ponce de León II (1524–1591) was a Spanish official and an interim governor of Puerto Rico. Ponce de León II was the first governor to be born in Puerto Rico. He was named after his grandfather, Juan Ponce de León, who became the first European explorer and governor of Puerto Rico in 1508.

== Early years ==
Juan Ponce de León II was born in San Juan, Puerto Rico, then part of the Viceroyalty of New Spain, to Juan García "Gracia" Troche and Juana Ponce de León. The Spanish conquistador Juan Ponce de León was Ponce de León II's maternal grandfather.

== Settlement in Trinidad ==
Ponce de León II was sent by the Spanish Crown to establish a settlement on the island of Trinidad in 1569. He founded the "town of the Circumcision", probably around modern Laventille. In 1570, this settlement was abandoned, possibly because of the raids by the Caribs, which resulted in the death of Ponce de Leon's son. According to some historians, Ponce de León II may have been an on-and-off governor of the island from 1571 to 1591.

== The first Puerto Rican acting governor of Puerto Rico ==
In 1579, the Spanish Crown named Jerónimo de Aguero Campuzano governor of Puerto Rico. He was to replace the then-governor Francisco De Obando Y Mexia. During the time that it took Jerónimo De Agüero Campuzano to travel from Spain to Puerto Rico, Ponce de León II was appointed acting governor. He thus became the first native-born Puerto Rican to be appointed Spanish governor of Puerto Rico.

== Written work ==
In 1581, at the request of King Philip II of Spain, Juan Lopez Melgarejo, who served as governor of Puerto Rico from 1581 to 1582, asked Juan Ponce de León II to write a general description of the West Indies with emphasis on the part corresponding to Puerto Rico. He did this with the collaboration of his fellow Puerto Rican, Antonio de Santa Clara. Ponce de León II's written work, Memorias de Melgarejo ('Melgarejo's Memoirs'), is one of Puerto Rico's most important historical documents. In 1581, Ponce de León II was able to establish the exact geographical coordinates of San Juan by observing an eclipse.

== Later years ==
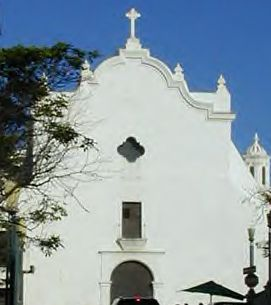
San José Church

Later in life, after he became a widower, Ponce de León II embraced and lived a religious life. He took it upon himself to transfer the body of his grandfather, Juan Ponce de León, to San José Church in San Juan from Cuba, where he had died and been buried in 1521 after being wounded in an attempt to colonize Florida. His grandfather's remains were moved once again in 1913, when they were transferred to the Cathedral of San Juan Bautista, which is also located in Old San Juan.

Juan Ponce de León II's remains are still interred at San José Church in San Juan. Puerto Rico has honoured his memory by naming a high school in the town of Florida, Puerto Rico after him.

== Ancestors ==
Ancestors of Ponce de León II

4.
2. Juan García "Gracia" Troche
5.
1. Juan Troche Ponce de León; b. San Juan, Puerto Rico
6. Juan Ponce de León; b. Santervás de Campos, Castilla y León, Spain
3. Juana Ponce de León
7. Leonor Ponce de León

== See also ==
- Juan Ponce de León
- List of Puerto Ricans
- List of governors of Puerto Rico

Preceded by Francisco de Obando y Mexia	Governor of Puerto Rico; 1579	Succeeded by Jerónimo de Agüero Campuzano
