= Francisco Pacheco de Toledo =

Spanish cardinal

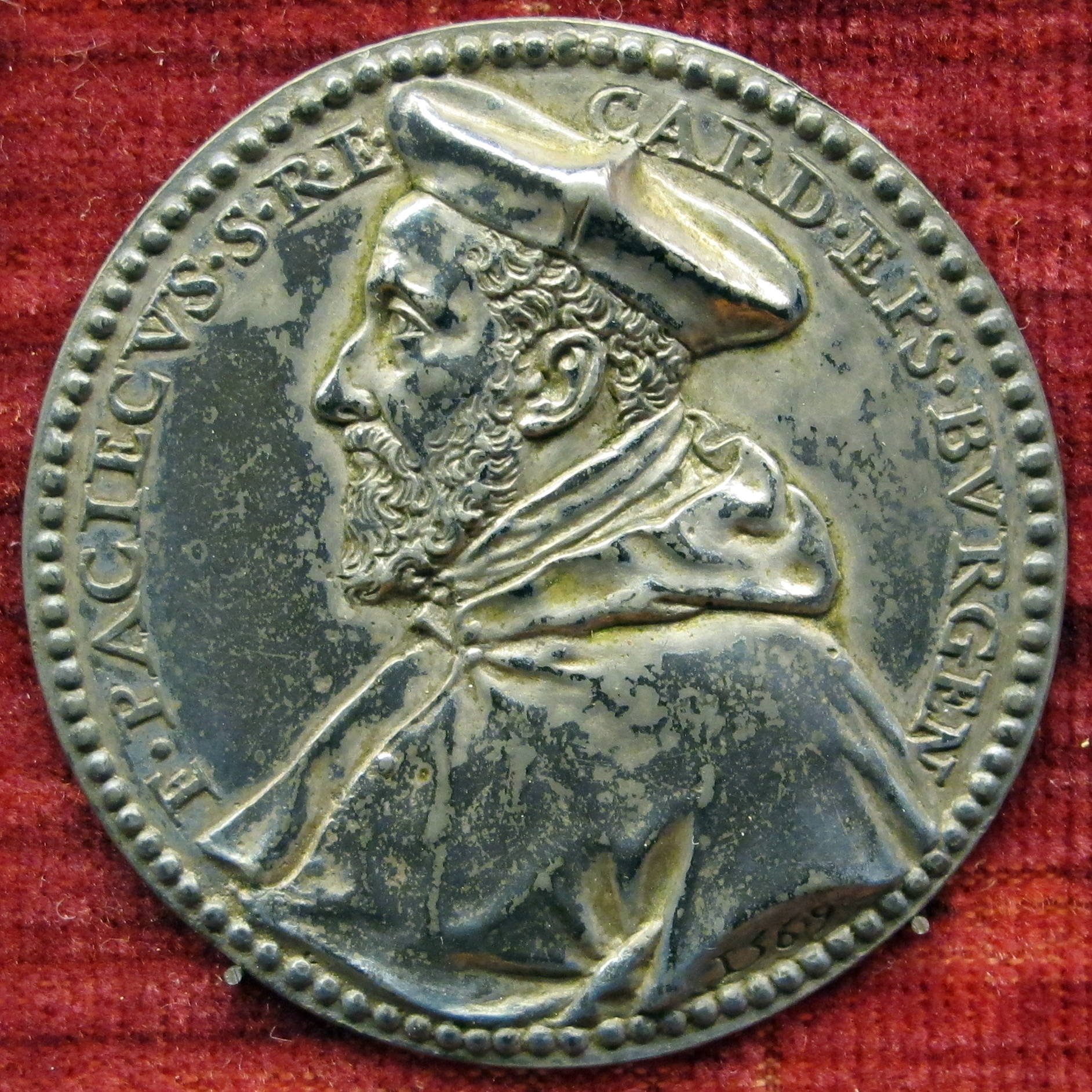
Medal with the effigy of cardenal Francisco Pacheco de Toledo

Francisco Pacheco de Toledo (1508 – 23 August 1579) was a Spanish cardinal.

== Life ==
Pacheco was born in Ciudad Rodrigo. He was admitted to the court of Charles V and Philip II of Spain. In 1545 he joined his uncle, cardinal Pedro Pacheco de Villena, on a trip to Rome, where the younger man won the admiration of pope Julius III, who made him a canon of Salamanca. He was also a canon at Toledo and inquisitor general of Spain.

He was made a cardinal on 26 February 1561 by pope Pius IV and later served as apostolic legate to Milan, before being elected bishop of Burgos in 1567 - during his time in that diocese it was promoted to an archdiocese, in 1574. He was Philip II's ambassador to the Holy See and a member of the Congregation of the Holy Office. He took part in the 1565-66 and 1572 papal conclaves. He died in Burgos.
