= Pedro Ponce de Léon (bishop of Zamora) =

Spanish Roman Catholic prelate

Most Reverend Pedro Ponce de Léon
- Bishop of Zamora
- Church: Catholic Church
- Diocese: Diocese of Zamora
- In office: 1610–1615
- Predecessor: Fernando Suárez de Figueroa
- Successor: Juan Zapata Osorio
- Previous post: Bishop of Ciudad Rodrigo (1605–1610)

Orders
- Consecration: 30 October 1605 by Luis Fernández de Córdoba

Personal details
- Born: 1561 Córdoba, Spain
- Died: Unknown

Pedro Ponce de Léon, O.P. (born 1561) was a Roman Catholic prelate who served as Bishop of Zamora (1610–1615) and Bishop of Ciudad Rodrigo (1605–1610).

== Biography ==
Pedro Ponce de Léon was born in Córdoba, Spain in 1561 and ordained a priest in the Order of Preachers. On 31 August 1605, he was appointed during the papacy of Pope Paul V as Bishop of Ciudad Rodrigo. On 30 October 1605, he was consecrated bishop by Luis Fernández de Córdoba, Bishop of Salamanca, with Fernando Suárez de Figueroa, Bishop of Zamora, and Salvador Ribera Avalos, Bishop of Quito, serving as co-consecrators. On 29 March 1610, he was appointed during the papacy of Pope Paul V as Bishop of Zamora. He served as Bishop of Zamora until his resignation in 1615.

== External links and additional sources ==
- Cheney, David M. "Diocese of Ciudad Rodrigo". Catholic-Hierarchy.org. (for Chronology of Bishops) ^{[self-published]}
- Chow, Gabriel. "Diocese of Ciudad Rodrigo". GCatholic.org. (for Chronology of Bishops) ^{[self-published]}
- Cheney, David M. "Diocese of Zamora". Catholic-Hierarchy.org. (for Chronology of Bishops) ^{[self-published]}
- Chow, Gabriel. "Diocese of Zamora (Spain)". GCatholic.org. (for Chronology of Bishops) ^{[self-published]}

Catholic Church titles
Preceded by Martín de Salvatierra	Bishop of Ciudad Rodrigo; 1605–1610	Succeeded by Antonio Idiáquez Manrique
Preceded by Fernando Suárez de Figueroa	Bishop of Zamora; 1610–1615	Succeeded by Juan Zapata Osorio
