= Pedro Ponce de León (bishop of Plasencia) =

Spanish bishop

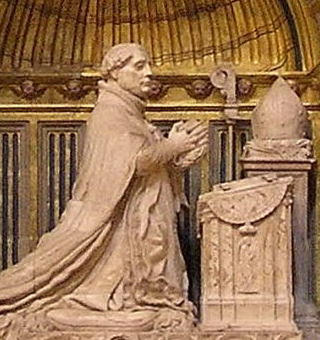
Statue of Pedro Ponce de León adorning his tomb in Plasencia.

Pedro Ponce de León (1510–1573) was a Spanish bishop who served as Bishop of Plasencia (1560–1573) and Bishop of Ciudad Rodrigo (1550–1560).

== Biography ==
Pedro Ponce de León was born in Córdoba, Andalusia in 1510. He was educated at the University of Salamanca and then ordained as a priest. In 1546, Charles I of Spain appointed Ponce de León to the Supreme Council of the Spanish Inquisition. On 27 June 1550, he was appointed during the papacy of Pope Julius III as Bishop of Ciudad Rodrigo. 26 January 1560, he was translated during the papacy of Pope Pius IV to the See of Plasencia. He attended the Council of Trent. He was appointed Grand Inquisitor of Spain in December 1572, but died before assuming office.

Ponce de León gained a reputation as a patron of ecclesiastical construction and of scholarship. He assembled a large library that came to the attention of Philip II of Spain. Many of these volumes would form the basis of the Biblioteca Laurentina in El Escorial.

Ponce de León died in Jaraicejo in 1573.

== External links and additional sources ==
- Cheney, David M. "Diocese of Ciudad Rodrigo". Catholic-Hierarchy.org. (for Chronology of Bishops) ^{[self-published]}
- Chow, Gabriel. "Diocese of Ciudad Rodrigo". GCatholic.org. (for Chronology of Bishops) ^{[self-published]}
- Cheney, David M. "Diocese of Plasencia". Catholic-Hierarchy.org. (for Chronology of Bishops) ^{[self-published]}
- Chow, Gabriel. "Diocese of Plasencia (Spain)". GCatholic.org. (for Chronology of Bishops) ^{[self-published]}
- This page is based on this page on Spanish Wikipedia.

Catholic Church titles
Preceded by Juan Aceres	Bishop of Ciudad Rodrigo; 1550–1560	Succeeded by Diego de Covarrubias y Leiva
Preceded by Gutierre Vargas de Carvajal	Bishop of Plasencia; 1560–1573	Succeeded by Martín de Córdoba Mendoza
Preceded by Diego de Espinosa	Grand Inquisitor of Spain; 1572–1573	Succeeded by Gaspar de Quiroga y Vela
