= Juan Ponce de León y Loayza =

Spanish colonial governor

- Born: Juan Ponce de León y Loayza; San Juan, Puerto Rico, New Spain
- Citizenship: Spain
- Known for: City of Ponce named after him
- Spouse: Doña Ana de Salamanca
- Parent(s): Juan Ponce de León II; Doña Isabel de Loayza

Juan Ponce de León y Loayza (Note: According to historian Francisco Lluch Mora, his full name was Juan Troche Ponce de León de Loaíza y Guzmán. See Francisco Lluch Mora, Orígenes Y Fundación De Ponce Y Otras Noticias Relativas a Su Desarrollo Urbano, Demográfico Y Cultural (Siglos XVI-XIX), p. 26.) (born San Juan, Puerto Rico) was the son of Juan Ponce de León II, the interim Spanish governor of Puerto Rico in 1579. His mother was Isabel de Loayza born in Villa Talavera de la Reina, Toledo, Spain, the daughter of Governor Iñigo López de Cervantes y Loayza. The city of Ponce, Puerto Rico, was named after Juan Ponce de León y Loayza.

== Noble lineage ==
Juan Ponce de León y Loayza's father, Juan Ponce de León II, was the son of lady Juana Ponce de León, one of three daughters born of Juan Ponce de León, the Spanish conquistador, and his wife Leonora Ponce de León (their other three children were Isabel, Maria, and Luis). Thus, Juan Ponce de León y Loayza was the great-grandson of the Spanish conquistador and first governor of Puerto Rico, Juan Ponce de León.

== Background ==
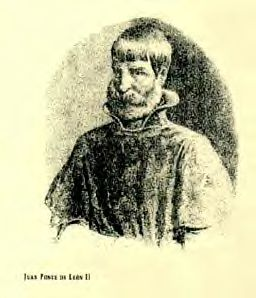
Juan Ponce de León II, the first native Puerto Rican governor of Puerto Rico, was the father of Juan Ponce de León y Loayza

In his trip from Spain to Puerto Rico in August 1577, Bishop Diego de Salamanca, not finding a commercial ship heading to Puerto Rico at the time, boarded a Spanish warship headed to Mexico, which dropped him off in the southern coast of Puerto Rico at Guanica. He then rode by horse through the interior of the Island in his way to his post in San Juan.

While traveling to San Juan, he took notice that the southern region was not being attended to by the Spanish leaders in San Juan, and while in San Juan, made efforts to have farmers sent to the South to settle there and work the land. Having married Doña Ana de Salamanca, the niece of Bishop Diego de Salamanca, Juan Ponce de León y Loayza learned of Diego's efforts and became interested in colonizing the area, thus becoming one of the first settlers on the southern shores of Puerto Rico.

The first Spanish settlement was near Rio Jacaguas, but being too vulnerable to indigenous peoples attacks at that location, the colony moved further west and inland to the banks of Rio Portugues, near the center of the current location of the city that bears his name.

== Political leadership ==
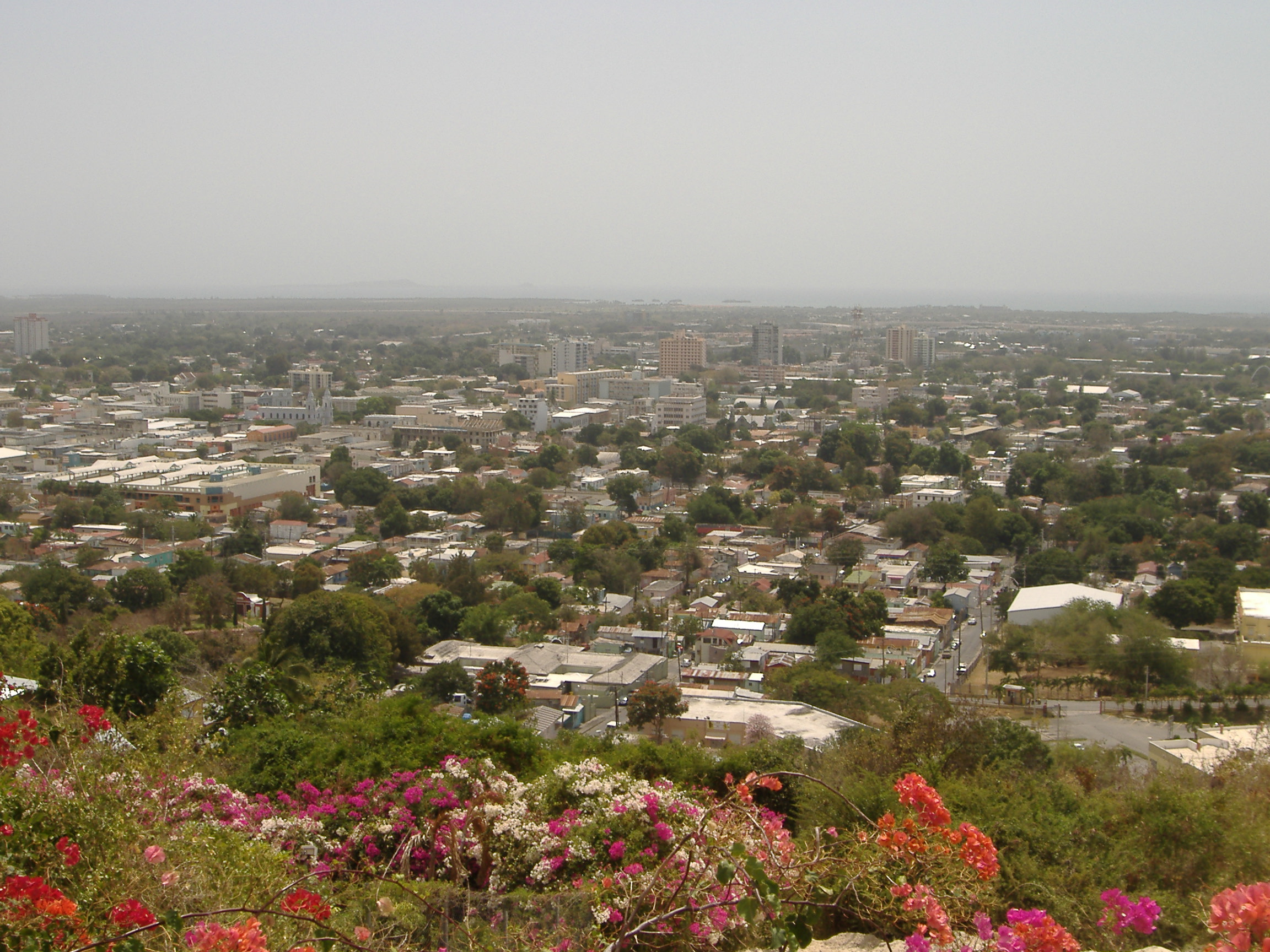
The city of Ponce was named after Juan Ponce de León y Loayza, the great-grandson of Spanish conquistador Juan Ponce de León

In 1670, a small chapel was built in the area where the actual plaza is now located. Ponce de León y Loaiza was the town's most enthusiastic colonizer; it was his main interest to have this area settled and incorporated into a town. These were the humble beginnings of what would become a very important and aristocratic city. While a resident there, and as son of interim governor of Puerto Rico, Juan Ponce de León y Loayza worked to have the Queen of Spain issue a permit to formalize the founding of a hamlet there. The hamlet had developed around the small chapel, raised and dedicated in honor of Our Lady of Guadalupe.

On 17 September 1692, the King of Spain Carlos II issued a Cédula Real (Royal Permit) converting the chapel into a parish, and in so doing officially recognized the small settlement as a hamlet as was Spanish custom. It is believed that Juan Ponce de León y Loayza himself was instrumental in obtaining the royal permit to formalize the founding of the hamlet.

== Aftermath ==
In 1848, many years after Juan Ponce de León y Loayza's death, the hamlet was declared a villa (Villa de Ponce) by Royal Decree. In 1877, it obtained its city charter, paving the way to becoming the modern-day city of Ponce.

== Ancestors ==
Ancestors of Juan Ponce de León y Loayza

8.
4. Juan Garcia "Gracia" Troche
9.
2. Juan Ponce de León II; b. San Juan, Puerto Rico, Viceroyalty of New Spain
10. Juan Ponce de León; b. Santervás de Campos, Castile, Spain
5. Juana Ponce de León
11. Leonor Ponce de León
1. Juan Ponce de León y Loayza; b. San Juan, Puerto Rico, Viceroyalty of New Spain
6. Governor Iñigo López de Cervantes y Loayza
3. Ysabel De Avila Loayza de Guzman; b. Villa Talavera de la Reina, Toledo, Spain
7.

== See also ==
- List of Puerto Ricans
