= Diocese of Ciudad Rodrigo =

Roman Catholic diocese in Spain

Coordinates: 40.5994°N 6.5356°W

Diocese of Ciudad Rodrigo Dioecesis Civitatensis Diócesis de Ciudad Rodrigo

Catholic
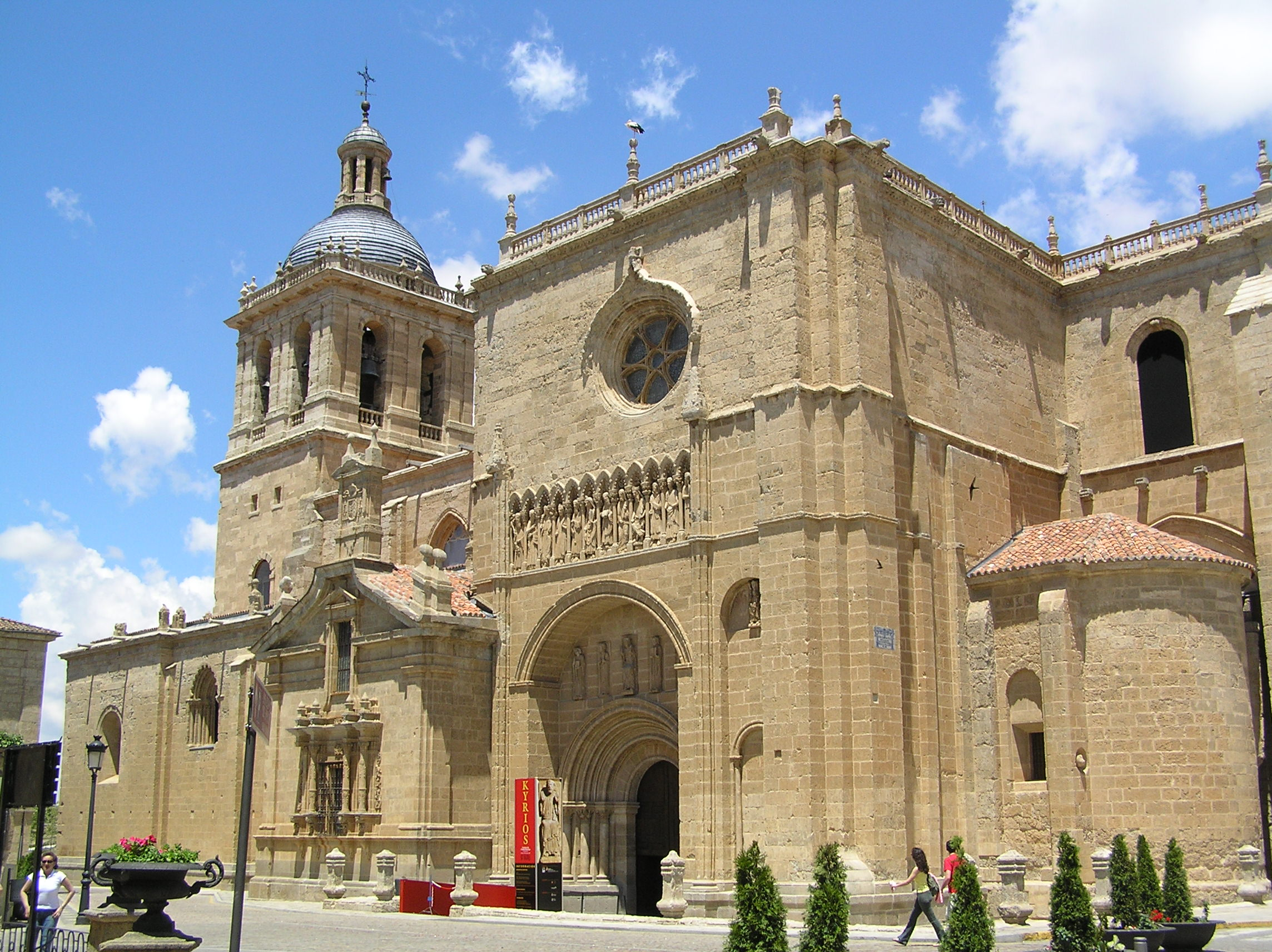
- Ciudad Rodrigo Cathedral

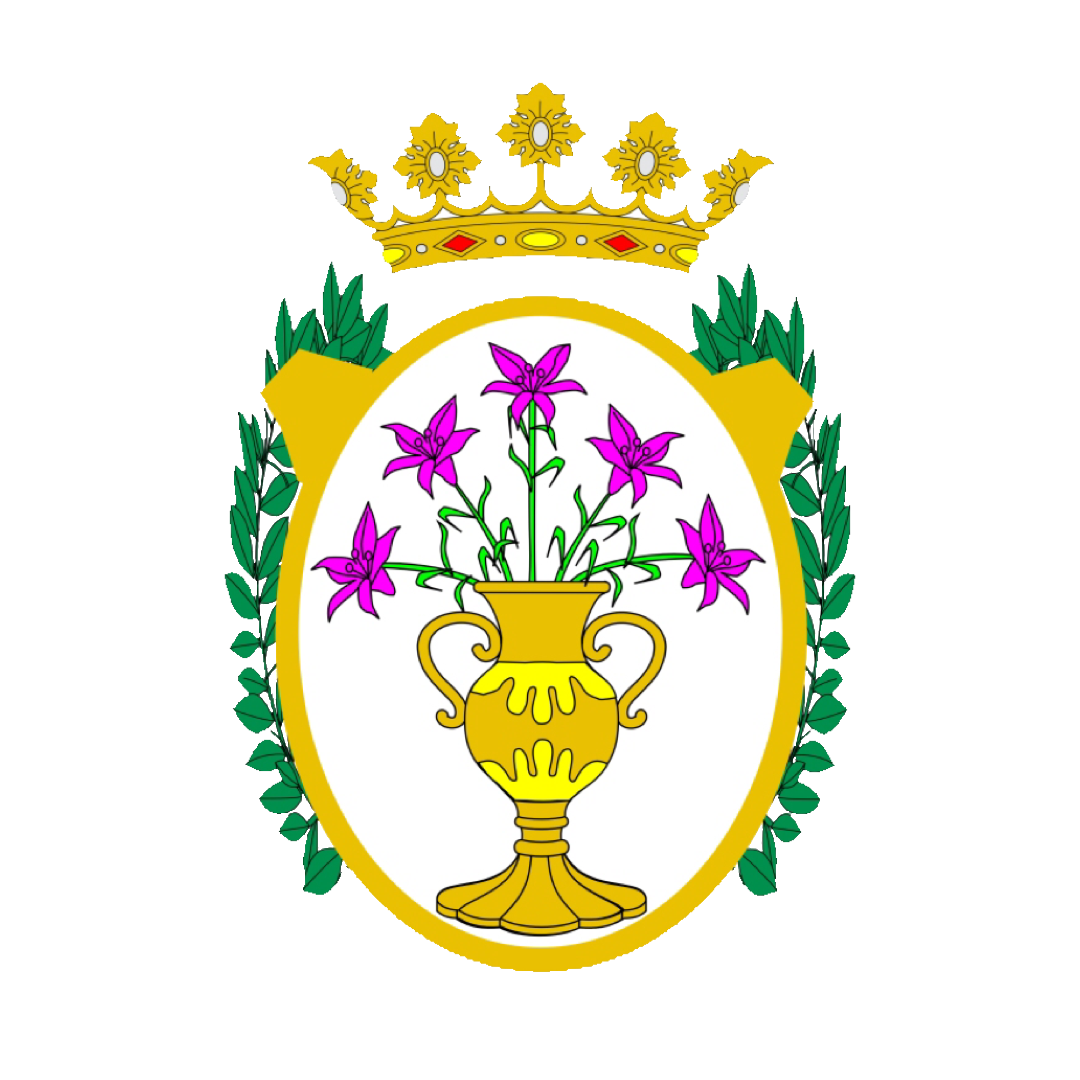
- Coat of arms

Location
- Country: Spain
- Ecclesiastical province: Valladolid
- Metropolitan: Valladolid

Statistics
- Area: 4,264 km^{2} (1,646 sq mi)
- Population: Total; Catholics: (as of 2016); 38 261; 37 047 (96.8%)

Information
- Denomination: Roman Catholic
- Rite: Latin Rite
- Established: 1168
- Cathedral: Cathedral of St Mary in Ciudad Rodrigo

Current leadership
- Pope: Leo XIV
- Bishop: José Luis Retana Gozalo
- Metropolitan Archbishop: Luis Javier Argüello García
- Bishops emeritus: Cecilio Raúl Berzosa Martínez

Map
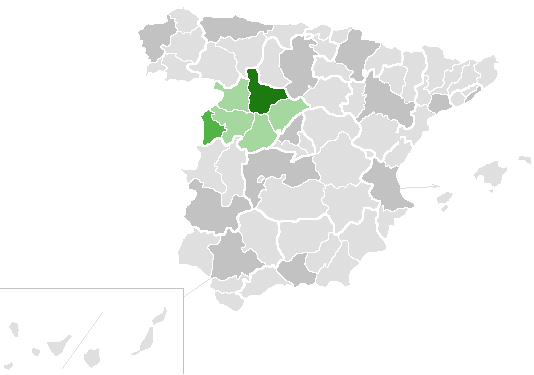

Website
- Website of the Diocese

The Diocese of Ciudad Rodrigo (Latin: Dioecesis Civitatensis) is a Latin diocese of the Catholic Church, located in the city of Ciudad Rodrigo in the ecclesiastical province of Valladolid.

== Foundation ==
The origins of the diocese of Ciudad Rodrigo have been studied in depth in two papers by Fidel Fita. The exact date when the town was conquered is unknown, but it was purchased by the citizens of Salamanca about 1135. They controlled it until 1161, when it was annexed to the royal domain by king Ferdinand II, who built a castle for the defence of the frontier and founded the diocese as well as two monasteries. The move provoked hostility: the Salamancans revolted in 1162 and Portugal, threatened by a new royal fortress so near its border, invaded in 1163.

When Ferdinand II founded the diocese in 1161, he claimed only to be re-establishing the ancient diocese of Caliabria, the location of which was in fact unknown. On 13 February Ferdinand issued a charter (called the fuero eclesiástico) for the new diocese, in which he gave the metropolitan Archbishop of Santiago de Compostela full authority to appoint the bishop without reference to the cathedral chapter. The king did not consult the pope, Alexander III, who showed he was displeased by the fuero in a bull of 1175. By that time it may have even been allowed to lapse, since a further royal charter of 20 September 1168 does not mention the special provision of 1161. It is uncertain how the first bishop, Domingo, came into his office, or even when. He is not recorded in any document before 1168 and he was dead by 1172 or 1173. Of the early bishops, only Pedro de Ponte is well known. Martín (1190–1211) and Lombardo (1214–27) are known only from the witness lists of royal charters and from Martín's stint as a papal judge-delegate.

The Almohads attacked the city (Alsibdat in Arabic sources) in 1174, the same year that a dispute over the boundary between the diocese of Ciudad Rodrigo and that of Salamanca was settled. The diocese was bounded to the north and east by the rivers Huebra, Yeltes and Duero. Its southern frontier was desolate and extended to the diocese of Coria. To its west lay Portugal.

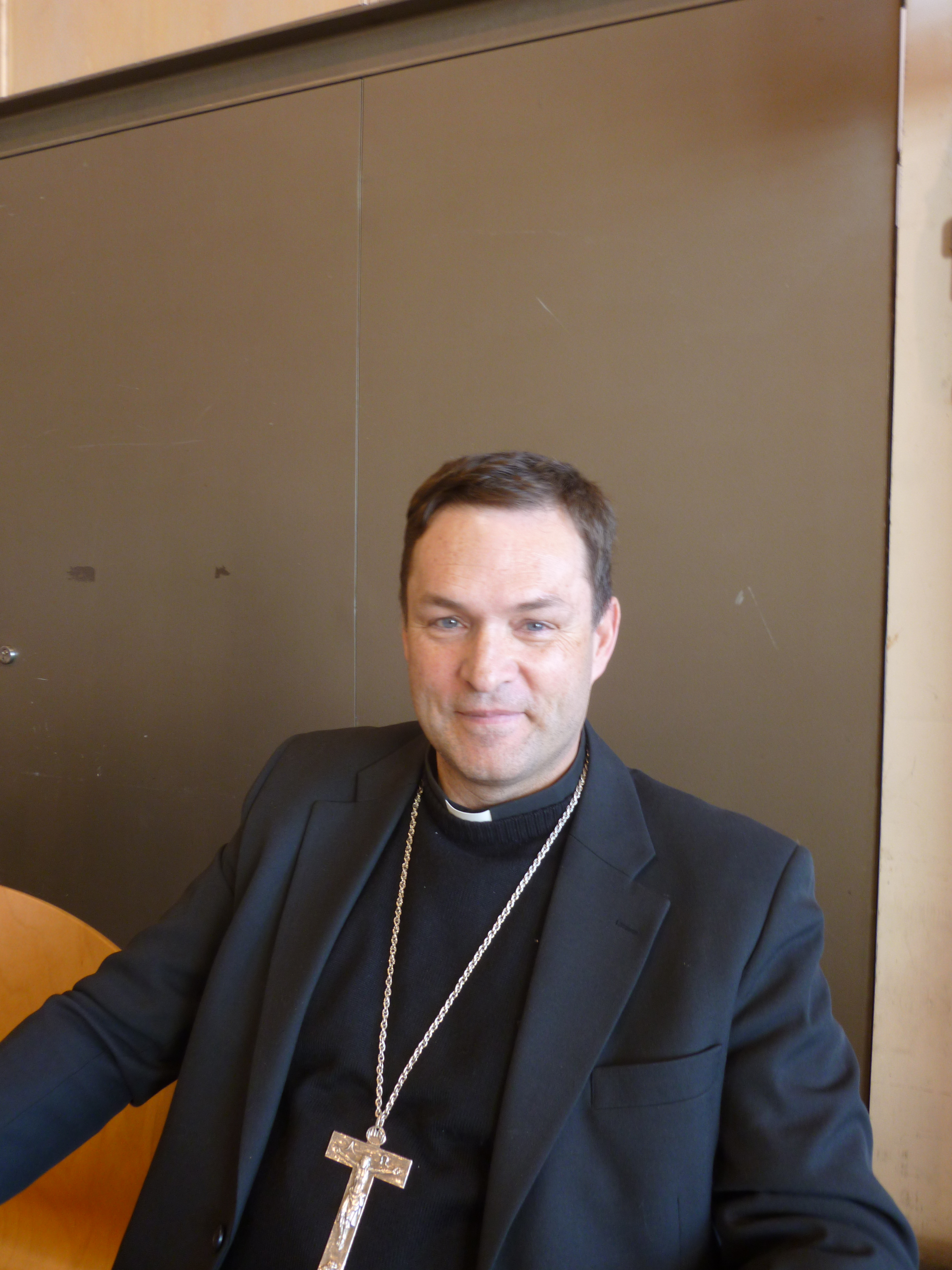
Bishop Raúl Berzosa

== Leadership ==
- Domingo (1161×68 – 1172×73)
- Pedro de Ponte (1174–1189)
- Martín (1190–1211)
- Lombardo (1214–1227)
- Miguel (1227–1245)
- Pedro II (1245–1251)
- Leonardo (1252–1259)
- Domingo Martín (1263–1274)
- Pedro III (1274–1284)
- Antonio (1285–1300)
- Alfonso (1300–1314)
- Bernardo (?–1324)
- Juan I (1324–?)
- Juan II (?–1339)
- Alfonso III (1344–1371)
- Rodrigo (1384–1391)
- Gonçalo Gonçalves (Apostolic Administrator 1403–1408)
- André Dias de Escobar, O.S.B. (25 May 1410 – 4 Sep 1422 Appointed, Bishop of Ajaccio)
- Alfonso V (? – 1429?)
- Sante (Sancho) (19 Mar 1431 – 14 Jan 1433 Appointed, Bishop of Minervino Murge)
- Alfonso Sánchez de Valladolid (1433–1455)
- Alfonso de Palenzuela (1460–1469)
- Alfonso de Paradinas (20 Oct 1469 – 15 Oct 1485 Died)
- Pedro Beltrán (1485–1487 Appointed, Bishop of Tui)
- Diego de Muros (Moiras), O.Merc. (1 Jun 1487 – 1492 Died)
- Juan Ortega Bravo de la Laguna (23 Jan 1493 – 6 Sep 1499 Appointed, Bishop of Calahorra y La Calzada)
- Diego de Peralta (1499–1501 Died)
- Valeriano Ordóñez Villaquirán (24 Sep 1501 – 22 Dec 1508 Appointed, Bishop of Oviedo)
- Francisco Bobadilla (22 Jan 1509 – 18 Nov 1510 Appointed, Bishop of Salamanca).
- Francisco Ruiz (bishop), O.F.M. (18 Nov 1509 – 14 Jul 1514 Appointed, Bishop of Ávila)
- Juan Pardo Tavera (14 Jul 1514 – 31 Dec 1523 Appointed, Bishop of Osma)
- Pedro Portocarrero (archbishop) (31 Dec 1523 – 26 Jun 1525 Appointed, Archbishop of Granada)
- Gonzalo Maldonado (bishop) (3 Jul 1525 – 29 Jun 1530 Died)
- Pedro Fernández Manrique (14 Dec 1530 – 11 Apr 1537 Appointed Bishop of Córdoba)
- Pedro Pacheco de Villena (Ladrón de Guevara) (11 Apr 1537 – 21 May 1539 Appointed, Bishop of Pamplona)
- Antonio Ramírez de Haro (18 Aug 1539 – 27 Jun 1541 Appointed, Bishop of Calahorra y La Calzada)
- Francisco de Navarra y Hualde (22 May 1542 – 14 Dec 1545 Appointed, Bishop of Badajoz)
- Juan Aceres (8 Jan 1546 – 31 Jul 1549 Died)
- Pedro Ponce de León (bishop of Plasencia) (27 Jun 1550 – 26 Jan 1560 Appointed, Bishop of Plasencia)
- Diego de Covarrubias y Leyva (26 Jan 1560 – 25 Oct 1564 Appointed, Archbishop (Personal Title) of Segovia)
- Diego de Simancas (15 Dec 1564 – 3 Dec 1568 Appointed, Bishop of Badajoz)
- Andrés Pérez (bishop) (10 Dec 1568 – 1583 Died)
- Pedro Vélez Guevara (9 Jan 1584 – 1585 Died)
- Bernardo de Sandoval y Rojas (8 Jan 1586 – 16 Mar 1588 Appointed, Bishop of Pamplona)
- Pedro Maldonado (23 Mar 1588 – 1591 Died)
- Martín de Salvatierra (15 May 1591 – 1604 Died)
- Pedro Ponce de Léon (bishop of Zamora) (31 Aug 1605 Appointed – 29 Mar 1610 Appointed, Bishop of Zamora)
- Antonio Idiáquez Manrique (26 May 1610 – 4 Feb 1613 Appointed, Bishop of Segovia)
- Jerónimo Ruiz Camargo (12 Aug 1613 – 23 May 1622 Appointed, Bishop of Coria)
- Francisco de Arriba (5 Sep 1622 – 1623 Died)
- Agustín Antolínez, O.S.A. (10 May 1623 – 1 Jul 1624 Appointed, Archbishop of Santiago de Compostela)
- Martín Fernández Portocarrero (19 Jul 1624 – 1625 Died)
- Juan de la Torre Ayala (7 Jan 1626 – 13 Jun 1638 Appointed, Bishop of Zamora)
- Francisco Diego Alarcón y Covarrubias (11 Apr 1639 – 18 Oct 1645 Appointed, Bishop of Salamanca)
- Juan Pérez Delgado (3 Dec 1646 – 11 Oct 1655 Confirmed, Bishop of Salamanca)
- Diego de Tejada y la Guardia (31 Jan 1656 – 6 May 1658 Appointed, Bishop of Pamplona)
- Diego Riquelme y Quirós (2 Dec 1658 – 19 Dec 1661 Confirmed, Bishop of Oviedo)
- Antonio Rodríguez Castañon (13 Feb 1662 – 7 Mar 1667 Appointed, Bishop of Zamora)
- Miguel de Cárdenas, O. Carm. (18 Jul 1667 Appointed – 22 Feb 1671 Died)
- Alfonso Bernardo de los Ríos y Guzmán, O.SS.T. (16 Nov 1671 – 13 Sep 1677 Appointed, Archbishop of Granada)
- Juan de Andaya y Sotomayor (10 Jan 1678 – 13 Nov 1678 Died)
- Sebastián Catalán (17 Jul 1679 – Sep 1687 Died)
- José González Blázquez, O. de M. (31 May 1688 – 24 Jan 1695 Appointed, Bishop of Plasencia)
- Francisco Manuel de Zúñiga Sotomayor y Mendoza, O.S.A. (21 Mar 1695 – 14 Dec 1712 Died)
- José Díez Santos de San Pedro (28 May 1714 – 24 Oct 1719 Died)
- Gregorio Tellez, O.F.M. Conv. (3 Feb 1721 – 2 Mar 1738 Retired)
- Clemente Comenge Avio (3 Mar 1738 – 12 Dec 1747 Died)
- Pedro Gómez de la Torre (2 Dec 1748 – 24 May 1756 Appointed, Bishop of Plasencia)
- José Francisco Biguezal (24 May 1756 – 2 Dec 1762 Died)
- Cayetano Antonio Cuadrillero Mota (18 Jul 1763 – 15 Dec 1777 Appointed, Bishop of León)
- Agustín de Alvarado y Castillo (14 Dec 1778 – 21 Jul 1781 Died)
- Ildefonso Molina y Santaella (17 Feb 1783 – 4 Dec 1784 Died)
- Benito de Uría y Valdés, O.S.B. (26 Sep 1785 – 23 Jul 1810 Died)
- Pedro Manuel Ramírez de la Piscina (19 Dec 1814 – 21 Aug 1835 Died)
- Jesús Enciso Viana (2 Feb 1950 – 30 May 1955 Appointed, Bishop of Mallorca)
- José Bascuñana y López (11 Jun 1955 – 20 May 1964 Appointed, Bishop of Solsona)
- Demetrio Mansilla Reoyo (7 Jul 1964 – 7 Jan 1988 Retired)
- Antonio Ceballos Atienza (7 Jan 1988 – 10 Dec 1993 Appointed, Bishop of Cádiz y Ceuta)
- Julián López Martín (15 Jul 1994 – 19 Mar 2002 Appointed, Bishop of León)
- Atilano Rodríguez Martínez (26 Feb 2003 – 2 Feb 2011 Appointed, Bishop of Sigüenza-Guadalajara)
- Raul Cecilio Berzosa Martinez (2 Feb 2011 – 16 Jan 2019 Resigned; formerly, Auxiliary Bishop of the Roman Catholic Archdiocese of Oviedo)
- José Luis Retana Gozalo (15 Nov 2021 – present; formerly, Bishop of the Roman Catholic Diocese of Plasencia)

== Sources ==
- Catholic Hierarchy
- Diocese website
