= Juan Coello Ribera y Sandoval =

Spanish Roman Catholic prelate

Most Reverend Juan Coello Ribera y Sandoval
- Bishop of Plasencia
- Church: Catholic Church
- Diocese: Diocese of Zamora
- In office: 1652–1655
- Predecessor: Diego Arce Reinoso
- Successor: Francisco Guerra (bishop)
- Previous post: Bishop of Zamora (1639–1652)

Orders
- Consecration: 16 October 1639 by Diego Castejón Fonseca

Personal details
- Born: 23 December 1607 Villarejo de la Peñuela, Spain
- Died: 1655 (age 47) Plasencia, Spain

Juan Coello Ribera y Sandoval (23 December 1607 – 1655) was a Roman Catholic prelate who served as Bishop of Plasencia (1652–1655) and Bishop of Zamora (1639–1652).

== Biography ==
Juan Coello Ribera y Sandoval was born in Villarejo de la Peñuela, Spain on 23 December 1607. On 11 April 1639, he was appointed during the papacy of Pope Urban VIII as Bishop of Zamora. On 16 October 1639, he was consecrated bishop by Diego Castejón Fonseca, Bishop Emeritus of Lugo, with Timoteo Pérez Vargas, Bishop of Ispahan, and Juan Alonso y Ocón, Bishop of Yucatán, serving as co-consecrators. On 11 December 1652, he was appointed during the papacy of Pope Julius III as Bishop of Plasencia. He served as Bishop of Plasencia until his death in 1655.

== External links and additional sources ==
- Cheney, David M. "Diocese of Zamora". Catholic-Hierarchy.org. (for Chronology of Bishops) ^{[self-published]}
- Chow, Gabriel. "Diocese of Zamora (Spain)". GCatholic.org. (for Chronology of Bishops) ^{[self-published]}
- Cheney, David M. "Diocese of Plasencia". Catholic-Hierarchy.org. (for Chronology of Bishops) ^{[self-published]}
- Chow, Gabriel. "Diocese of Plasencia (Spain)". GCatholic.org. (for Chronology of Bishops) ^{[self-published]}

Catholic Church titles
Preceded by Juan de la Torre Ayala	Bishop of Zamora; 1639–1652	Succeeded by Antonio Paiño Sevilla
Preceded by Diego Arce Reinoso	Bishop of Plasencia; 1652–1655	Succeeded by Francisco Guerra (bishop)
