= Fernando Andrade Sotomayor =

Spanish Catholic prelate (1579–1655)

Most Reverend Fernando Andrade Sotomayor
- Archbishop of Santiago de Compostela
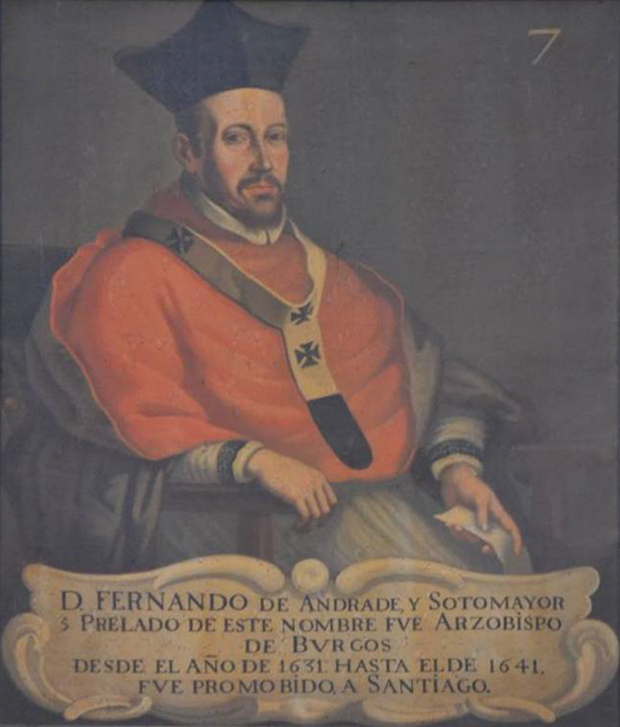
- Fernando Andrade Sotomayor.jpg
- Church: Catholic Church
- Archdiocese: Archdiocese of Santiago de Compostela
- In office: 1645–1655
- Predecessor: Agustín de Spínola Basadone
- Successor: Pedro Carrillo Acuña y Bureba
- Previous posts: Bishop of Palencia (1628–1631); Archbishop of Burgos (1631–1640); Archbishop (Personal Title) of Sigüenza (1640–1645)

Orders
- Consecration: 10 September 1628 by Luis Camargo Pacheco

Personal details
- Born: 1579 Vilagarcía de Arousa, Spain
- Died: 21 January 1655 (age 76) Santiago de Compostela, Spain

Fernando Andrade Sotomayor (1579 – 21 January 1655) was a Roman Catholic prelate who served as Archbishop of Santiago de Compostela (1645–1655), Archbishop (Personal Title) of Sigüenza (1640–1645), Archbishop of Burgos (1631–1640), and Bishop of Palencia (1628–1631).

== Biography ==
Fernando Andrade Sotomayor was born in Vilagarcía de Arousa, Spain. On 29 May 1628, he was appointed during the papacy of Pope Urban VIII as Bishop of Palencia. On 10 September 1628, he was consecrated bishop by Diego Guzmán de Haros, Archbishop of Seville, with Luis Camargo Pacheco, Auxiliary Bishop of Seville, and Juan de la Sal, Auxiliary Bishop of Seville, serving as co-consecrators. On 10 November 1631, he was appointed during the papacy of Pope Urban VIII as Archbishop of Burgos. On 10 September 1640, he was appointed during the papacy of Pope Urban VIII as Archbishop (Personal Title) of Sigüenza. On 20 March 1645, he was appointed during the papacy of Pope Innocent X as Archbishop of Santiago de Compostela. He served as Archbishop of Santiago de Compostela until his death on 21 January 1655. He was also Governor of Galicia between 1649 and 1652.

While bishop, he was the principal consecrator of Gonzalo Sánchez de Somoza Quiroga, Bishop of Mondoñedo (1639), and Juan Pérez de Vega, Bishop of Tui (1649).

== External links and additional sources ==
- Cheney, David M. "Diocese of Palencia". Catholic-Hierarchy.org. (for Chronology of Bishops) ^{[self-published]}
- Chow, Gabriel. "Diocese of Palencia (Spain)". GCatholic.org. (for Chronology of Bishops) ^{[self-published]}
- Cheney, David M. "Archdiocese of Burgos". Catholic-Hierarchy.org. (for Chronology of Bishops) ^{[self-published]}
- Chow, Gabriel. "Metropolitan Archdiocese of Burgos (Spain)". GCatholic.org. (for Chronology of Bishops) ^{[self-published]}
- Cheney, David M. "Diocese of Sigüenza-Guadalajara". Catholic-Hierarchy.org. (for Chronology of Bishops) ^{[self-published]}
- Chow, Gabriel. "Diocese of Sigüenza–Guadalajara (Spain)". GCatholic.org. (for Chronology of Bishops) ^{[self-published]}
- Cheney, David M. "Archdiocese of Santiago de Compostela". Catholic-Hierarchy.org. (for Chronology of Bishops) ^{[self-published]}
- Chow, Gabriel. "Archdiocese of Santiago de Compostela (Spain)". GCatholic.org. (for Chronology of Bishops) ^{[self-published]}

Catholic Church titles
Preceded by Miguel Ayala	Bishop of Palencia; 1628–1631	Succeeded by Cristóbal Guzmán Santoyo
Preceded by José González Díez	Archbishop of Burgos; 1631–1640	Succeeded by Francisco de Manso Zuñiga y Sola
Preceded by Pedro González de Mendoza	Archbishop (Personal Title) of Sigüenza; 1640–1645	Succeeded by Pedro Tapia
Preceded by Agustín de Spínola Basadone	Archbishop of Santiago de Compostela; 1645–1655	Succeeded by Pedro Carrillo Acuña y Bureba
