= José Francisco de Isla =

Spanish Jesuit, preacher, humorist and satirist

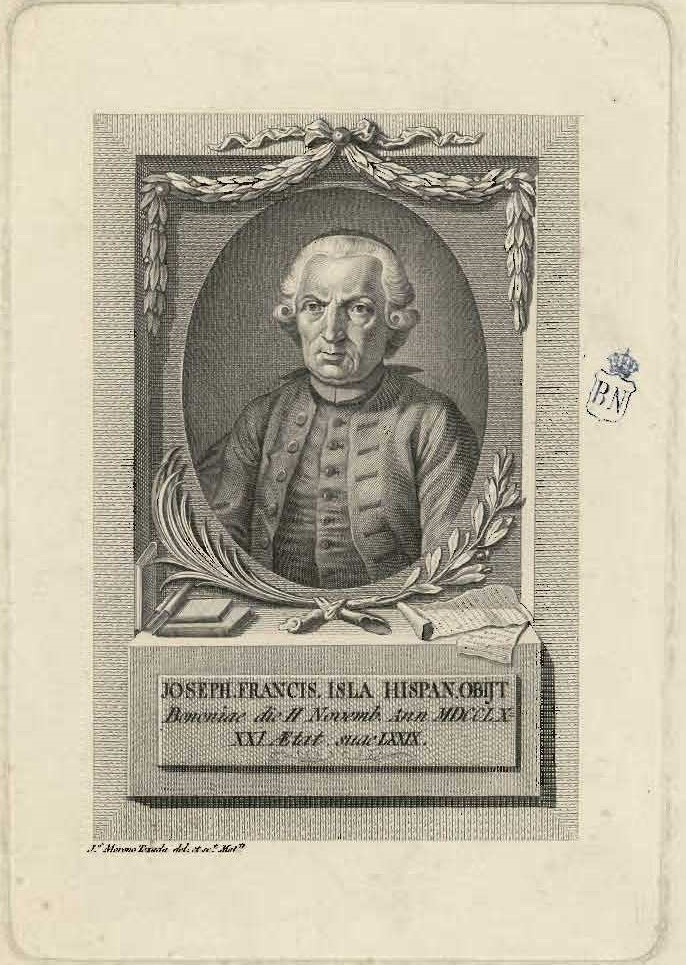
José Francisco de Isla

José Francisco de Isla (24 April 1703 – 2 November 1781) was a Spanish Jesuit, celebrated as a preacher and a humorist and satirist in the style of Miguel de Cervantes.

== Biography ==
De Isla's parents were José Isla de la Torre and Ambrosia Rojo. Although born accidentally in Vidanes (close to Cistierna) in the eastern Leonese mountain, he spent his childhood in the village of Valderas where his mother was a native, in the southern province of Leon. Premature, bright and highly gifted intellectually, he was a compulsive reader from childhood and graduated with his bachiller in law at eleven years old, according to his biographer Jose Ignacio de Salas. He entered the Society of Jesus at sixteen (1719) in the novitiate of Villagarcía de Campos, studying philosophy and theology at the University of Salamanca. At nineteen he translated History of the Emperor Teodosio de Flechier. In collaboration with a teacher, also a Jesuit, Father Luis de Lozada (1681–1748), he wrote La juventud triunfante (Triumphant Youth) (Salamanca, 1727), a description in prose and verse, interspersed with four comedies by unnamed authors, on feasts celebrated, in recognition of the canonization of St. Aloysius Gonzaga and St. Stanislaus Kostka.

== Early career ==
De Isla was a professor of philosophy and theology in Segovia, Santiago de Compostela, Medina del Campo and Pamplona. In Pamplona he translated The Compendium of the History of Spain by Father Duchesne and the Christian Year by Father Jean Croisset, also noted as a preacher in Valladolid and Zaragoza.

His work Triunfo del amor y de la lealtad: dia grande de Navarra was a subtly satirical depiction of the celebrations held at Pamplona to mark the visit of King Ferdinand VI. Initially, the book got an enthusiastic reception from some high-ranking readers - but a scandal broke out when, on closer reading, the real intent, biting and far from flattering, was revealed. De Isla was forced to leave his city and took up the life of an itinerant preacher, where he gained considerable popularity.

The Marquis de la Ensenada recommended him as a confessor of Queen Barbara of Braganza, but he refused. He published under the assumed name of Francisco Lobón de Salazar, benefiting from Aguilar and priest of Villagarcia de Campos. It was during this time that the most important of his works, the first part of Historia del famoso predicador fray Gerundio de Campazas, alias Zotes was written and published, originally under the name of his friend Don Francisco Lobon de Salazar, in 1758, but de Isla's authorship of it was soon revealed. The work, full of fresh humor, depicted a peasant boy who rises to prominence as a preacher due to his smooth tongue. It constituted a biting satire on the charlatanism and bombast of the popular preaching friars of the day. This is a novel very low in action, in which two elements are combined in the most unusual way: a satirical and burlesque narrative fiction about bad preachers, who still followed the pompous and pedantic style of the Gongoran Baroque preachers, and a didactic treatise of sacred oratory. In this combination the author also intersperses various stories and jokes., the influence of the picaresque novel and Cervantes style are seen in this work. What stands out most is its wit and irony, despite its virtually nonexistent action.

== Later life ==
Isla's reputation and his position in the history of Spanish literature are linked particularly to his satire against the preachers of his time. The Bishop of Palencia opposed the work that was printed in his diocese. As a result of this Isla published it in Madrid, and on 22 February 1758 the first part appeared under the title Historia del famoso predicador fray Gerundio de Campazas, alias Zotes. Of the 1500 copies that were printed, 800 were sold within the first twenty-four hours, and the edition was exhausted in three days.

The Council of the Inquisition, on 14 March 1758, ordered the suspension "until further notice" of the reprint of the first part and the second printing. Later, the book was banned, by decree of 20 May 1760, after a two-year process. The second part appeared in clandestine edition in 1768 and the Inquisition also banned it by decree in 1766. Although Isla's purpose for writing the book was to improve preaching, one of the foundations of pastoral activity, the satirical book contributed to feeding the poor image members of religious orders had among the popular classes, and was used as argument by the anticlericalism in the following century. It is now considered a masterpiece of Spanish literature.

=== In exile ===
For several years de Isla lived in Villagarcia de Campos (Valladolid), until the Company was expelled from Spain in 1767. He left Pontevedra very ill and passed through Corsica and various Italian cities until he settled in Bologna, where he was hosted by the Tedeschi counts in their Palazzo. There, he had regular dealings with Spanish students housed in the Royal College of Spain, founded by Cardinal Gil Álvarez de Albornoz. During his exile he continued his correspondence in a straightforward, homely and affectionate style with his sister Doña Maria Francisca de Isla, correspondence that formed the volume Cartas familiares (Family letters). In Bologna he entertained himself by performing various translations, such as Cartas de Jose Antonio Constantini (Letters from Jose Antonio Constantini), in eight volumes, which he completed in the Papal States, Arte de encomendarse a Dios by Father Antonio Francesco Bellati, and the famous picaresque novel by Alain René Lesage, Gil Blas de Santillana, in whose prologue he accused the French author of having stolen and translated several Spanish novels of the genre to compose his own. This translation was printed in 1787 and 1788. The translation was so successful that no less than fifty-six reprints were made before the twentieth century.

=== Death ===
De Isla died in Bologna in extreme poverty in 1781. His last book, Cartas de Juan de la Encina (Letters from Juan de la Encina), published posthumously (1784), constituted a sharp condemnation of the practices of the Spanish physicians of his time. In 1803 the priest, José Ignacio de Salas printed his biography in Madrid and in the Ibarra workshop, under the title Compendio histórico de la vida, carácter moral y literario del célebre padre Isla con la noticia analítica de todos sus escritos (Compendium history of the life, moral and literary character of the famous father Isla with analytical notes on all his writings), paid for by his devoted sister, who was also the editor of many other works by her brother.

== Works ==
- Papeles crítico-apologéticos (1726) - Critical and apologetic Papers.
- El tapabocas (1727) - The Mask.
- Juventud triunfante (1727) - Triumphant Youth.
- Cartas de Juan de la Encina. Obra de Josef Francisco de Isla contra un libro que escribió don Josef Carmona, cirujano intitulado: "Método Racional de curar Sabañones" (1732) - Letters of Juan de la Encina. Work of Josef Francisco de Isla against a book written by Don Josef Carmona, surgeon Entitled "Rational Method to cure chilblains".
- Triunfo del amor y de la lealtad. Día grande de Navarra (1746) - Triumph of love and loyalty. The great of Navarre day.
- Historia del famoso predicador Gerundio de Campazas, alias Zotes (1758 and 1768) - History of the famous preacher Friar Gerund de Campazas, otherwise Gerund Zotes (1772 translation).
- Mercurio general de Europa, lista de sucesos varios (1758) - Mercury General of Europe, list of various events
- Los aldeanos críticos o cartas críticas sobre lo que se verá, Madrid (1759) - Critical Villagers or critical letters about what will be seen.
- Cartas familiares (1786). Barcelona, 1883, León (1903) - Family letters.
- Cartas a mi tia la de Albacete (1787) - Letters to my aunt from Albacete.
- Reflexiones cristianas sobre las grandes verdades de la fe, Madrid (1785) - Christian Reflections on the great truths of faith.
- Cartas atrasadas del Parnaso and Sueño escrito por el padre Josef Francisco de Isla en la exaltacion del Señor D. Carlos III (que Dios guarde) al trono de España, Madrid: Oficina de Pantaleon Aznar (1785) - Overdue letters from Parnassus and A Dream written by Father José Francisco de Isla in exaltation of Lord D. Carlos III (God bless) to the throne of Spain.
- Sermones (1792 and 1793) - Sermons (six volumes).
- Colección de papeles crítico-apologéticos, Madrid (1787 and 1788) - Collection of critical and apologetic papers (two volumes).
- Translation of Alain Rene Lesage's Gil Blas de Santillana (1787 and 1788).
- Translation of The Compendium of the History of Spain by Father Duchesne.
- Translation of The Christian Year by Father Jean Croiset.
- Translation of the Critical scholarly letters on various issues: scientific, psychic and moral, fashion and taste of this century by Venetian lawyer Giuseppe Antonio Constantini in eight volumes.
- Translation of The art of giving oneself over to God, i.e. the virtues of prayer by Father Antonio Francesco Bellati.

== Bibliography ==
- B. Gaudeau, Les Prêcheurs burlesques en Espagne au XVIII^{e} siècle, 1891.
