= Diego de Arce y Reinoso =

Spanish bishop

Most Reverend Diego de Arce y Reinoso Ávila y Palomares
- Grand Inquisitor of Spain
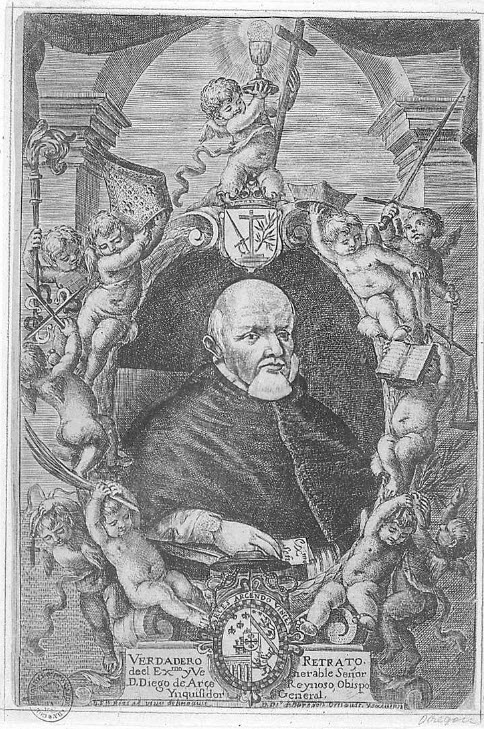
- Diego de Arce y Reinoso
- Church: Catholic Church
- In office: 1643–1665
- Predecessor: Antonio de Sotomayor
- Successor: Pascual de Aragón
- Previous posts: Bishop of Tui (1635–1637); Bishop of Ávila (1637–1640); Bishop of Plasencia (1640–1652)

Orders
- Consecration: 3 February 1636 by Fernando Valdés Llano

Personal details
- Born: 25 April 1587 Zalamea de la Serena, Spain
- Died: 18 July 1665 (aged 78)

Diego de Arce y Reinoso Ávila y Palomares (25 April 1587 – 18 July 1665) was a Spanish bishop who served as Grand Inquisitor of Spain from 1643 to 1665; and as Bishop of Plasencia (1640–1652), Bishop of Ávila (1637–1640), and Bishop of Tui (1635–1637).

== Biography ==
Diego de Arce y Reinoso was born in Zalamea de la Serena on 25 April 1587, the son of Fernando de Arce y Reynoso, Lord of Arce, and his wife Catalina Ávila y Palomares. He was baptized on 3 May 1587.

Becoming a churchman, he gained the favor of Philip IV of Spain, who appointed him to the Real Cancillería de Granada, the Audiencia de Sevilla, and the Council of Castile. The king also arranged for him to become successively Bishop of Tuy (1635–37), Bishop of Ávila (1637–40), and Bishop of Plasencia (1640–52). On 3 Feb 1636, he was consecrated bishop by Fernando Valdés Llano, Archbishop of Granada, with Gaspar Prieto Orduña, Bishop of Alghero, and Miguel Avellán, Auxiliary Bishop of Seville serving as co-consecrators.

He became Grand Inquisitor of Spain on 14 November 1643, holding that position until 1665. He was long involved in plans to found a school in Zalamea, but the Portuguese Restoration War prevented the beginning of construction of the school until after his death. He died on 19 July 1665.

== Episcopal succession ==
While bishop, he was the principal consecrator of:

- Pedro Urbina Montoya, Bishop of Coria (1644);
- Juan Juániz de Echalar, Bishop of Mondoñedo (1645);
- Juan Ortiz de Zárate (bishop), Bishop of Salamanca (1645);
- Francisco Torres Grijalba, Bishop of Mondoñedo (1648);
- Francisco Torres Sánchez de Roa, Bishop of Lugo (1650);
- Antonio de Estrada Manrique, Bishop of Palencia (1657);
- Juan Emanuel de Espinosa, Bishop of Urgell (1660);
- José Fageda, Bishop of Gerona (1660);
- Francisco de Gamboa, Bishop of Coria (1660);
- Andrés Girón, Bishop of Lugo (1660);
- Nicolás Rodríguez Hermosino, Bishop of Astorga (1662);
- Dionisio Pérez Escobosa, Bishop of Mondoñedo (1663); and
- Lorenzo de Sotomayor, Bishop of Zamora (1663).

== External links and additional sources ==
- Cheney, David M. "Diocese of Tui-Vigo". Catholic-Hierarchy.org. (for Chronology of Bishops) ^{[self-published]}
- Chow, Gabriel. "Diocese of Tui-Vigo (Spain)". GCatholic.org. (for Chronology of Bishops) ^{[self-published]}
- Cheney, David M. "Diocese of Ávila". Catholic-Hierarchy.org. (for Chronology of Bishops) ^{[self-published]}
- Chow, Gabriel. "Diocese of Ávila". GCatholic.org. (for Chronology of Bishops) ^{[self-published]}
- Cheney, David M. "Diocese of Plasencia". Catholic-Hierarchy.org. (for Chronology of Bishops) ^{[self-published]}
- Chow, Gabriel. "Diocese of Plasencia (Spain)". GCatholic.org. (for Chronology of Bishops) ^{[self-published]}
- Brief Biography from Spanish-language website

Catholic Church titles
Preceded by Diego de Vela y Becerril	Bishop of Tuy; 1635–1637	Succeeded by Diego Rueda Rico
Preceded by Pedro Cifuentes Loarte	Bishop of Ávila; 1637–1640	Succeeded by Juan Vélez de Valdivielso
Preceded by Plácido Pacheco de Haros	Bishop of Plasencia; 1640–1652	Succeeded by Juan Coello Ribera y Sandoval
Preceded by Antonio de Sotomayor	Grand Inquisitor of Spain; 1643–1665	Succeeded by Pascual de Aragón
