= José González Díez =

Spanish Catholic prelate (1566–1631)

Most Reverend José González
- Archbishop of Burgos
- Church: Catholic Church
- Archdiocese: Archdiocese of Burgos
- In office: 1630–1631
- Predecessor: Fernando Acevedo González
- Successor: Fernando Andrade Sotomayor
- Previous posts: Bishop of Palencia (1616–1625); Bishop of Pamplona (1625–1627); Archbishop of Santiago de Compostela (1627–1630)

Orders
- Consecration: April 1616 by Fernando Acevedo González

Personal details
- Born: 11 November 1566 Villadiezma, Spain
- Died: 28 March 1631 (age 64) Burgos, Spain

José González Díez, O.P. (11 November 1566 – 28 March 1631) was a Roman Catholic prelate who served as Archbishop of Burgos (1630–1631), Archbishop of Santiago de Compostela (1627–1630), Bishop of Pamplona (1625–1627), and Bishop of Palencia (1616–1625).

== Biography ==
José González Díez was born in Villadiezma, Spain and ordained a priest in the Order of Preachers. On 29 February 1616, he was appointed during the papacy of Pope Paul V as Bishop of Palencia. In April 1616, he was consecrated bishop by Fernando Acevedo González, Archbishop of Burgos. On 30 March 1625, he was selected by the King of Spain and confirmed by Pope Urban VIII on 28 July 1625 as Bishop of Pamplona. On 14 January 1627, he was selected by the King of Spain and confirmed by Pope Urban VIII on 17 May 1627 as Archbishop of Santiago de Compostela. On 12 August 1630, he was appointed during the papacy of Pope Urban VIII as Archbishop of Burgos. He served as Archbishop of Burgos until his death on 28 March 1631.

== External links and additional sources ==
- Cheney, David M. "Diocese of Palencia". Catholic-Hierarchy.org. (for Chronology of Bishops) ^{[self-published]}
- Chow, Gabriel. "Diocese of Palencia (Spain)". GCatholic.org. (for Chronology of Bishops) ^{[self-published]}
- Cheney, David M. "Archdiocese of Santiago de Compostela". Catholic-Hierarchy.org. (for Chronology of Bishops) ^{[self-published]}
- Chow, Gabriel. "Archdiocese of Santiago de Compostela (Spain)". GCatholic.org. (for Chronology of Bishops) ^{[self-published]}
- Cheney, David M. "Archdiocese of Burgos". Catholic-Hierarchy.org. (for Chronology of Bishops) ^{[self-published]}
- Chow, Gabriel. "Metropolitan Archdiocese of Burgos (Spain)". GCatholic.org. (for Chronology of Bishops) ^{[self-published]}

Catholic Church titles
Preceded by Felipe Tarsis de Acuña	Bishop of Palencia; 1616–1625	Succeeded by Miguel Ayala
Preceded by Cristóbal de Lobera y Torres	Bishop of Pamplona; 1625–1627	Succeeded by Pedro Fernández Zorrilla
Preceded by Agustín Antolínez	Archbishop of Santiago de Compostela; 1627–1630	Succeeded by Agustín Spínola Basadone
Preceded by Fernando Acevedo González	Archbishop of Burgos; 1630–1631	Succeeded by Fernando Andrade Sotomayor
