= Gaspar de Borja y Velasco =

Spanish cardinal, ecclesiastic and politician

His Eminence Gaspar de Borja y Velasco
- Archbishop of Toledo; Primate of Spain
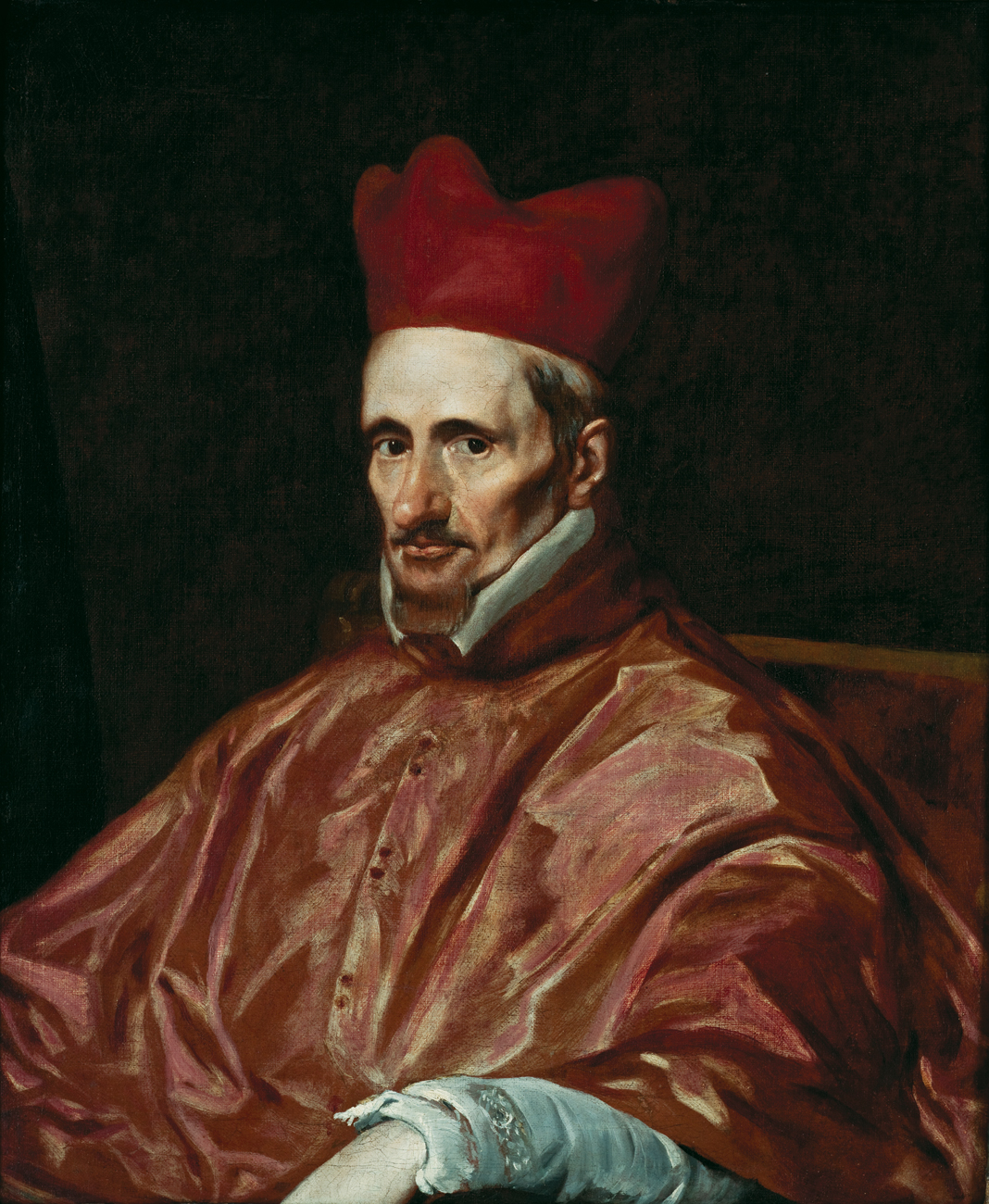
- Portrait by Diego Velázquez, ca. 1643
- Church: Roman Catholic
- Archdiocese: Toledo
- See: Cathedral of Saint Mary of Toledo
- Installed: 16 January 1645
- Term ended: 28 December 1645
- Predecessor: Position vacant
- Successor: Baltasar Moscoso y Sandoval
- Other post: Cardinal-bishop of Albano (1630–45)
- Previous post: Archbishop of Seville (1632–45) Cardinal-priest of Santa Croce in Gerusalemme (1616–30) Cardinal-priest of Santa Susanna (1611–16)

Orders
- Consecration: 15 September 1630 by Antonio Marcello Barberini
- Created cardinal: 17 August 1611 by Pope Paul V
- Rank: Cardinal-bishop

Personal details
- Born: 26 June 1580 Villalpando, Castile and León, Kingdom of Spain
- Died: 28 December 1645 (aged 65) Toledo, Castile–La Mancha, Kingdom of Spain
- Education: Colegio Mayor de San Ildefonso

Gaspar de Borja y Velasco (26 June 1580 – 28 December 1645) was a Spanish cardinal, ecclesiastic and politician. He belonged to the house of Borgia (though he always used the Spanish spelling of Borja) and served as Primate of Spain, Archbishop of Seville, Archbishop of Toledo and viceroy of Naples. He was the great-great-great-great-grandson of Pope Alexander VI.

== Family ==
Borja was born at Villalpando. His father was Francisco Tomás de Borja y Centellas, 6th Duke of Gandia, the son of Francis Borgia (4th Duke of Gandia and 3rd Father-General of the Society of Jesus) and thus related to Pope Callixtus III and Pope Alexander VI - one historian refers to Gaspar wanting to become the third Borgia pope. Gaspar's mother was Juana Enríquez de Velasco y de Aragón, daughter of Iñigo Tovar y Fernández de Velasco, 4th Duke of Frías and 10th Constable of Castile.

== Life ==
He graduated from the Universidad Complutense, in the Colegio Mayor de San Ildefonso, with a degree in Theology. He owed his rise through the church hierarchy to Francisco Gómez de Sandoval y Rojas, a favourite in the court of Philip III. He was made a cardinal in August 1611 by Pope Paul V, as cardinal priest of Santa Susanna, and stayed in Rome to exercise his office. He was indignant when the minor nobleman Cardinal Gabriel Trejo Paniagua was chosen as Spain's crown-cardinal instead of him and, when Trejo lost political influence after his patron's fall, Borja played an even greater part in the Roman Curia. He supported the crown-cardinal Antonio Zapata y Cisneros, served a first term as Spain's ambassador to the Holy See (1616–19), participated in the Holy Office, attended the papal conclaves in 1621 and 1623, and held the posts of Camerlengo (1627–28) and Bishop of Albano (1630–1645).

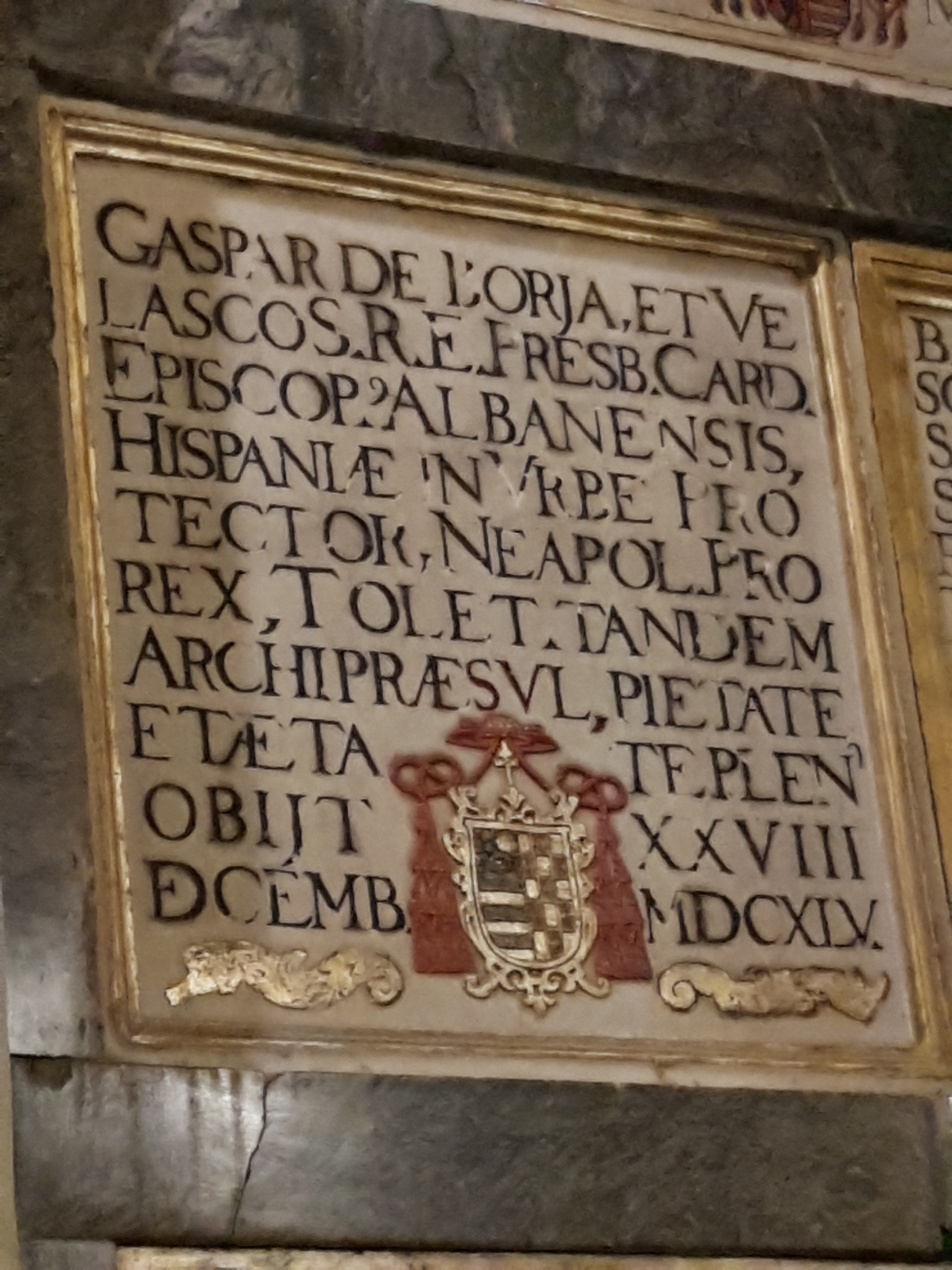
His tomb at the Toledo Cathedral

From 1631 to 1634, he was once again Spain's ambassador to the Holy See and, on orders from the Spanish king, accused Pope Urban VIII (then maintaining neutrality or favouring France) in the consistory of 8 March 1632 of failing to defend Catholicism in its Thirty Years War with the Protestant nations and threatened that Spain would depose him. Part of the grounds for Spain's complaint lay in unfounded rumours of the pope siding with the Protestant Gustavus Adolphus of Sweden (a heretic in the church's eyes). In response, the pope changed his policy somewhat and made a contribution to the Spanish exchequer, which was then running out of money to finance the war. However, Borja's approach to the pope had lacked diplomacy and in retaliation Urban forced him out of Rome in 1634 and had Spain dismiss him as their ambassador.

Borja then returned to the Archdiocese of Seville, of which he was already archbishop. The patent enmity between Urban VIII and Cardinal Borja showed itself when Urban refused Philip IV's proposal of Borja for Archbishop of Toledo in 1643, though he received the post from Urban's successor Pope Innocent X in 1645, shortly before Borja's death in Toledo later that year.

He was also President of the Council of Aragon between 1637 and 1645.

He is buried in the Cathedral of Toledo.

== In fiction ==
In the 1632 series of alternate history science fiction novels, the South European thread is a series of novels in which Borja is the villain. He attempts to depose and kill Urban VIII, who is perceived by Spain as sympathetic to Gustavus Adolphus and his heretical American allies in the United States of Europe. Borja, exceeding his orders from Madrid, has a rump consistory declare him Pope; but is widely dismissed as an anti-pope.

== Sources ==
- von Thiessen, Hillard (2004). "Familienbande und Kreaturenlohn. Der (Kardinal-)Herzog von Lerma und die Kronkardinäle Philipps III. von Spanien". Die Jagd nach dem roten Hut, hrsg. von Arne Karsten (in German). Göttingen. ISBN 3-525-36277-3.

Government offices
Preceded by The Duke of Osuna	Viceroy of Naples; 1620	Succeeded by Antonio Zapata
Catholic Church titles
Preceded by Carlo Emanuele Pio di Savoia	Bishop of Albano; 1630–1645	Succeeded by Bernardino Spada
Preceded by Diego Guzmán de Haros	Archbishop of Seville; 1632–1645	Succeeded by Agustín Spínola Basadone
Preceded by Ferdinand of Austria	Archbishop of Toledo and Primate of Spain; 1645	Succeeded by Baltasar Moscoso
