= Martín Carrillo Alderete =

Spanish Roman Catholic prelate

Most Reverend Gabriel Alderete Diaz
- Archbishop of Granada
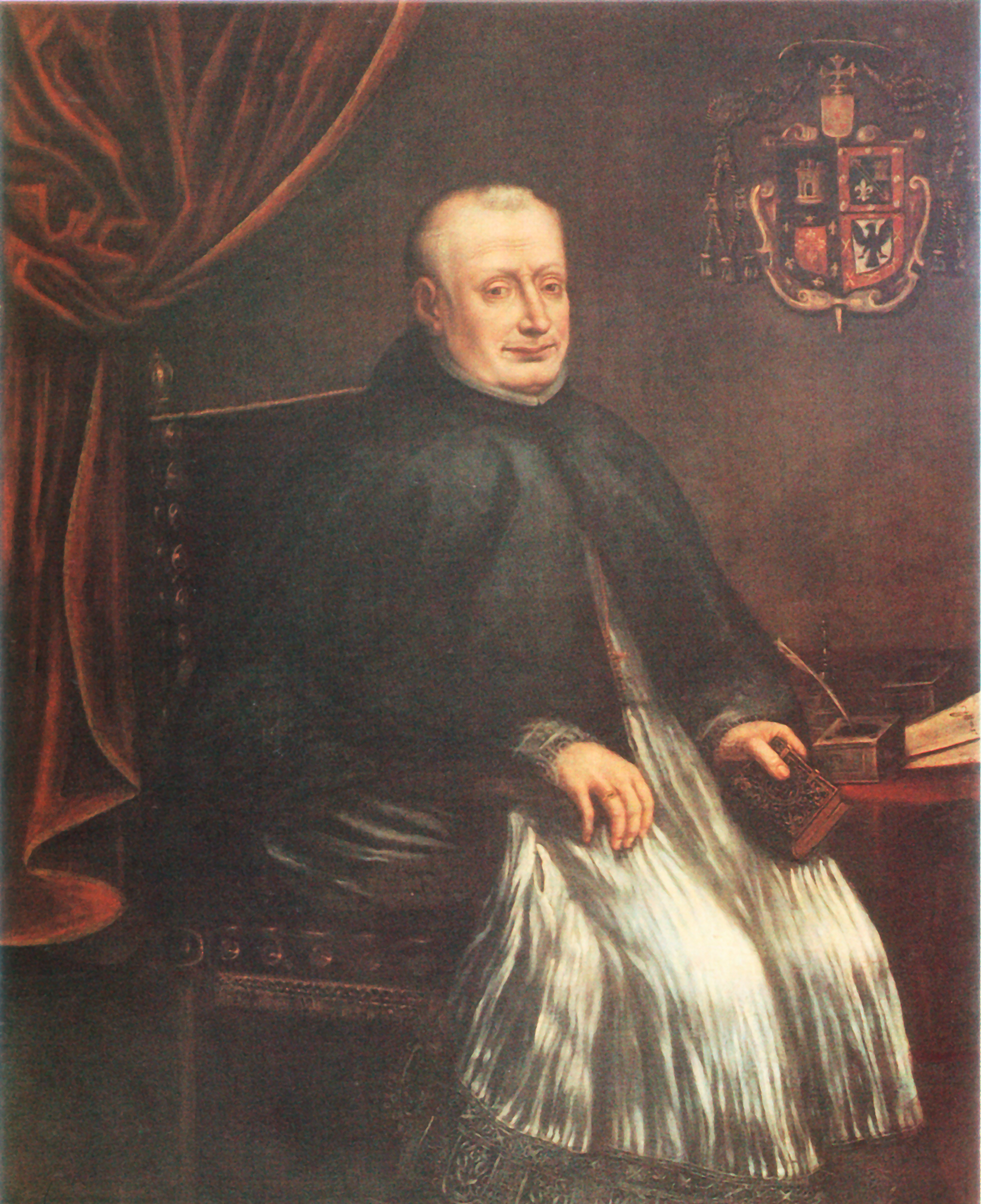
- Church: Catholic Church
- Archdiocese: Archdiocese of Granada
- In office: 1641–1653
- Predecessor: Fernando Valdés Llano
- Successor: Antonio Calderón
- Previous posts: Bishop of Oviedo (1633–1636); Bishop of Osma (1636–1641)

Orders
- Consecration: 20 May 1633 by Domingo Pimentel Zúñiga

Personal details
- Born: 1576 Toledo, Spain
- Died: 29 June 1653 (aged 76–77) Granada, Spain

Martín Carrillo Alderete (died 29 June 1653) was a Roman Catholic prelate who served as Archbishop of Granada (1641–1653), Bishop of Osma (1636–1641), and Bishop of Oviedo (1633–1636).

== Biography ==
Martín Carrillo Alderete was born in Toledo, Spain. On 10 January 1633, he was appointed during the papacy of Pope Urban VIII as Bishop of Oviedo. On 20 May 1633, he was consecrated bishop by Domingo Pimentel Zúñiga, Bishop of Osma, with Juan Bravo Lagunas, Bishop Emeritus of Ugento, and Cristóforo Chrisostome Carletti, Bishop of Termia, serving as co-consecrators. On 9 June 1636, he was appointed during the papacy of Pope Urban VIII as Bishop of Osma. On 1 July 1641, he was appointed during the papacy of Pope Urban VIII as Archbishop of Granada. He served as Archbishop of Granada until his death on 29 June 1653.

== Episcopal succession ==
While bishop, he was the principal consecrator of:

- Cristóbal Guzmán Santoyo, Bishop of Palencia (1634);
- Juan Valenzuela Velázquez, Bishop of Salamanca (1642);

and the principal co-consecrator of:

- Gonzalo Chacón Velasco y Fajardo, Bishop of Calahorra y La Calzada (1633).

== See also ==
- Catholic Church in Spain

== External links and additional sources ==
- Cheney, David M. "Metropolitan Archdiocese of Oviedo". Catholic-Hierarchy.org. (for Chronology of Bishops) ^{[self-published]}
- Chow, Gabriel. "Archdiocese of Oviedo". GCatholic.org. (for Chronology of Bishops) ^{[self-published]}
- Cheney, David M. "Diocese of Osma-Soria". Catholic-Hierarchy.org. (for Chronology of Bishops) ^{[self-published]}
- Chow, Gabriel. "Diocese of Osma-Soria (Italy)". GCatholic.org. (for Chronology of Bishops) ^{[self-published]}
- Cheney, David M. "Archdiocese of Granada". Catholic-Hierarchy.org. (for Chronology of Bishops) ^{[self-published]}
- Chow, Gabriel. "Metropolitan Archdiocese of Granada(Spain)". GCatholic.org. (for Chronology of Bishops) ^{[self-published]}

Catholic Church titles
Preceded by Juan Pereda Gudiel	Bishop of Oviedo; 1633–1636	Succeeded by Antonio Valdés Herrera
Preceded by Francisco Villafañe	Bishop of Osma; 1636–1641	Succeeded by Antonio Valdés Herrera
Preceded by Fernando Valdés Llano	Archbishop of Granada; 1641–1653	Succeeded by Antonio Calderon (bishop)
