= Francisco Guerra =

Francisco Guerra may refer to:

- Fran Guerra (born 1992), Spanish basketball player
- Francisco Guerra (bishop) (1587–1656), Roman Catholic bishop
