= Juan Ortiz de Zárate (bishop) =

Spanish Roman Catholic prelate

Most Reverend Juan Ortiz de Zárate
- Church: Catholic Church
- Diocese: Diocese of Salamanca
- In office: 1645–1646
- Predecessor: Juan Valenzuela Velázquez
- Successor: Francisco Diego Alarcón y Covarrubias

Orders
- Consecration: 30 November 1645 by Diego Arce Reinoso

Personal details
- Born: 1581 Aranda de Duero
- Died: 24 April 1646 (age 65) Salamanca, Spain

Juan Ortiz de Zárate (1581 – 24 April, 1646) was a Roman Catholic prelate who served as Bishop of Salamanca (1645–1646).

== Biography ==
Juan Ortiz de Zárate was born in Aranda de Duero in 1581. On 14 May 1645, he was selected by the King of Spain and confirmed by Pope Innocent X as Bishop of Salamanca. On 30 November 1645, he was consecrated bishop by Diego Arce Reinoso, Bishop of Plasencia, with Miguel Avellán, Titular Bishop of Siriensis, and Pedro Orozco, Titular Bishop of Temnus, serving as co-consecrators. He served as Bishop of Salamanca until his death on 24 April 1646.

Catholic Church titles
Preceded by Juan Valenzuela Velázquez	Bishop of Salamanca; 1645–1646	Succeeded by Francisco Diego Alarcón y Covarrubias
