= Miguel Avellán =

Spanish Roman Catholic prelate

Most Reverend Miguel Avellán
- Auxiliary Bishop of Toledo
- Church: Catholic Church
- Archdiocese: Archdiocese of Toledo

Orders
- Ordination: 1600

Personal details
- Born: 1580 Huéscar, Spain
- Died: October 1650 (age 70) Toledo, Spain

Miguel Avellán, O.F.M. (24 April 1580 – October 1650) was a Roman Catholic prelate who served as Auxiliary Bishop of Toledo (1633–1650).

== Biography ==
Miguel Avellán was born in Huéscar, Spain and ordained a priest in the Order of Friars Minor in 1600. On 20 June 1633 he was selected by the King of Spain and confirmed by Pope Urban VIII as Auxiliary Bishop of Toledo and Titular Bishop of Siriensis. He served as Auxiliary Bishop of Toledo until his death in October 1650.

== Episcopal succession ==
As auxiliary bishop of a prominent Spanish archdiocese, he participated in many of the country's consecration of bishops serving as the principal consecrator of:

- Antonio González Acevedo, Bishop of Almería (1634);

and principal co-consecrator of:

- Marcos Ramírez de Prado y Ovando, Bishop of Chiapas (1633);
- Bartolomé Santos de Risoba, Bishop of León (1634);
- Antonio Valdés Herrera, Bishop of Mondoñedo (1634);
- Diego Castejón Fonseca, Bishop of Lugo (1634);
- Luis García Rodríguez, Bishop of Orense (1634);
- Diego Arce Reinoso, Bishop of Tui (1636);
- Diego Serrano Sotomayor, Bishop of Solsona (1636);
- Juan Velasco Acevedo, Bishop of Orense (1637);
- Juan Alonso y Ocón, Bishop of Yucatán (1638);
- Diego Rueda Rico, Bishop of Tui (1639);
- Mauro Diego de Tovar y Valle Maldonado, Bishop of Caracas, Santiago de Venezuela (1639);
- Antonio Guzmán Cornejo, Bishop of Tui (1640);
- Domingo Ramírez de Arellano, Bishop of Chiapas (1641);
- Pedro Rosales Encio, Bishop of Lugo (1641);
- Hernando de Ramírez y Sánchez, Bishop of Panamá (1642);
- José de Argáiz Pérez, Bishop of Almería (1642);
- Juan Piñeiro Osorio, Bishop of Calahorra y La Calzada (1643);
- Antonio Paiño Sevilla, Bishop of Orense (1643);
- Juan Sánchez Alonso de Guevara, Bishop of Lugo (1643);
- Pedro Urbina Montoya, Bishop of Coria (1644);
- Juan Juániz de Echalar, Bishop of Mondoñedo (1645);
- Juan Ortiz de Zárate (bishop), Bishop of Salamanca (1645);
- Juan del Pozo Horta, Bishop of Lugo (1646); and
- Francisco Torres Grijalba, Bishop of Mondoñedo (1648).

== See also ==
- Catholic Church in Spain
