= Antonio Guzmán Cornejo =

Spanish Roman Catholic prelate

Most Reverend Antonio Guzmán Cornejo
- Bishop of Tui
- Church: Catholic Church
- Diocese: Diocese of Tui
- In office: 1640–1642
- Predecessor: Diego Rueda Rico
- Successor: Diego Martínez Zarzosa

Orders
- Consecration: December 1640 by Agustín Spínola Basadone

Personal details
- Died: 29 August 1642 Tui, Spain

Antonio Guzmán Cornejo (died 1642) was a Roman Catholic prelate who served as Bishop of Tui (1640–1642).

== Biography ==
On 17 July 1640, Antonio Guzmán Cornejo was selected by the King of Spain as Bishop of Tui and confirmed by Pope Urban VIII on 8 October 1640. In December 1640, he was consecrated bishop by Agustín Spínola Basadone, Archbishop of Santiago de Compostela, with Miguel Avellán, Titular Bishop of Siriensis, and Fernando Montero Espinosa, Bishop of Nueva Segovia, serving as co-consecrators. He served as Bishop of Tui until his death on 29 August 1642.

== External links and additional sources ==
- Cheney, David M. "Diocese of Tui-Vigo". Catholic-Hierarchy.org. (for Chronology of Bishops) ^{[self-published]}
- Chow, Gabriel. "Diocese of Tui-Vigo (Spain)". GCatholic.org. (for Chronology of Bishops) ^{[self-published]}

Catholic Church titles
Preceded by Diego Rueda Rico	Bishop of Tui; 1640–1642	Succeeded by Diego Martínez Zarzosa
