= Antonio Valdés Herrera =

Spanish Roman Catholic prelate (1578–1657)

Most Reverend Antonio Valdés Herrera
- Bishop of Córdoba
- Church: Catholic Church
- Diocese: Diocese of Córdoba
- In office: 1653–1657
- Predecessor: Juan Francisco Pacheco
- Successor: Francisco Diego Alarcón y Covarrubias
- Previous posts: Bishop of Mondoñedo (1633–1636); Bishop of Oviedo (1636–1641); Bishop of Osma (1641–1643)

Orders
- Ordination: by Fernando Valdés Llano
- Consecration: 19 March 1634

Personal details
- Born: 1578 Valladolid, Spain
- Died: 13 April 1657 (age 79) Córdoba, Spain

Antonio Valdés Herrera (1578 – 13 April 1657) was a Roman Catholic prelate who served as Bishop of Córdoba (1653–1657), Bishop of Osma (1641–1643), Bishop of Oviedo (1636–1641), and Bishop of Mondoñedo (1633–1636).

== Biography ==
Antonio Valdés Herrera was born in Valladolid, Spain in 1578. On 19 December 1633, he was appointed during the papacy of Pope Urban VIII as Bishop of Mondoñedo. On 19 March 1634, he was consecrated bishop by Fernando Valdés Llano, Archbishop of Granada, with Juan Bravo Lagunas, Bishop Emeritus of Ugento, and Miguel Avellán, Titular Bishop of Siriensis, serving as co-consecrators. On 23 June 1636, he was appointed during the papacy of Pope Urban VIII as Bishop of Oviedo. On 21 May 1641, he selected by the King of Spain and confirmed by Pope Urban VIII on 21 October 1641 as Bishop of Osma. On 13 July 1653, he selected by the King of Spain and confirmed by Pope Innocent X on 10 November 1653 as Bishop of Córdoba. He served as Bishop of Córdoba until his death on 13 April 1657.

== External links and additional sources ==
- Cheney, David M. "Metropolitan Archdiocese of Oviedo". Catholic-Hierarchy.org. (for Chronology of Bishops)^{self-published}
- Chow, Gabriel. "Archdiocese of Oviedo". GCatholic.org. (for Chronology of Bishops)^{self-published}
- Cheney, David M. "Diocese of Osma-Soria". Catholic-Hierarchy.org. (for Chronology of Bishops) ^{[self-published]}
- Chow, Gabriel. "Diocese of Osma-Soria (Italy)". GCatholic.org. (for Chronology of Bishops) ^{[self-published]}
- Cheney, David M. "Diocese of Córdoba". Catholic-Hierarchy.org. (for Chronology of Bishops) ^{[self-published]}
- Chow, Gabriel. "Diocese of Córdoba". GCatholic.org. (for Chronology of Bishops) ^{[self-published]}

Catholic Church titles
Preceded by Francisco Villafañe	Bishop of Mondoñedo; 1633–1636	Succeeded by Gonzalo Sánchez de Somoza Quiroga
Preceded by Martín Carrillo Alderete	Bishop of Oviedo; 1636–1641	Succeeded by Bernardo Caballero Paredes
Preceded by Martín Carrillo Alderete	Bishop of Osma; 1641–1643	Succeeded by Juan de Palafox y Mendoza
Preceded by Juan Francisco Pacheco	Bishop of Córdoba; 1653–1657	Succeeded by Francisco Diego Alarcón y Covarrubias
