= Francisco Torres Grijalba =

Roman Catholic bishop of Mondoñedo Spain

Most Reverend Francisco Torres Grijalba
- Bishop of Mondoñedo
- Church: Catholic Church
- Archdiocese: Diocese of Mondoñedo
- In office: 1648–1662
- Predecessor: Juan Juániz de Echalar
- Successor: Dionisio Pérez Escobosa

Orders
- Consecration: 29 March 1648 by Diego Arce Reinoso

Personal details
- Born: 1585 Madrid, Spain
- Died: 4 September 1662 (age 77) Mondoñedo, Spain

Francisco Torres Grijalba (1585 – 4 September 1662) was a Roman Catholic prelate who served as Bishop of Mondoñedo (1648–1662).

== Biography ==
Francisco Torres Grijalba was born in Madrid, Spain and ordained a priest in the Order of Saint Augustine. On 13 January 1648, he was selected by the King of Spain and confirmed by Pope Innocent X as Bishop of Mondoñedo. On 29 March 1648, he was consecrated by Diego Arce Reinoso, Bishop of Plasencia with Miguel Avellán, Auxiliary Bishop of Toledo, serving as co-consecrator. He served as Bishop of Mondoñedo until his death on 4 September 1662. While bishop, he served as the primary co-consecrator of Juan Pérez de Vega, Bishop of Tui.

Catholic Church titles
Preceded by Juan Juániz de Echalar	Bishop of Mondoñedo; 1648–1662	Succeeded by Dionisio Pérez Escobosa
