= Gonzalo Sánchez de Somoza Quiroga =

Spanish Roman Catholic prelate

Most Reverend Gonzalo Sánchez de Somoza Quiroga
- Bishop of Mondoñedo
- Church: Catholic Church
- Archdiocese: Diocese of Mondoñedo
- In office: 1638–1644
- Predecessor: Antonio Valdés Herrera
- Successor: Juan Juániz de Echalar

Orders
- Consecration: 23 January 1639 by Fernando Andrade Sotomayor

Personal details
- Born: 1575 Santa María de Ferreira, Spain
- Died: 14 August 1644 (age 69) Mondoñedo, Spain

Gonzalo Sánchez de Somoza Quiroga (1575 – 14 August 1644) was a Roman Catholic prelate who served as Bishop of Mondoñedo (1638–1644).

== Biography ==
Gonzalo Sánchez de Somoza Quiroga was born in Santa María de Ferreira, Spain. On 21 June 1638, he was selected by the King of Spain and confirmed by Pope Urban VIII as Bishop of Mondoñedo. On 23 January 1639, he was consecrated by Fernando Andrade Sotomayor, Archbishop of Burgos with Bartolomé Santos de Risoba, Bishop of León, and Cristóbal Guzmán Santoyo, Bishop of Palencia, serving as co-consecrators. He served as Bishop of Mondoñedo until his death on 14 August 1644. While bishop, he served as the primary co-consecrator of Diego Martínez Zarzosa, Bishop of Tui (1644).

Catholic Church titles
Preceded by Antonio Valdés Herrera	Bishop of Mondoñedo; 1638–1644	Succeeded by Juan Juániz de Echalar
