= Antonio de Estrada Manrique =

Spanish Roman Catholic prelate

Most Reverend Antonio de Estrada Manrique
- Bishop of Palencia
- Church: Catholic Church
- Diocese: Diocese of Palencia
- In office: 1657–1658
- Predecessor: Cristóbal Guzmán Santoyo
- Successor: Enrique Peralta y Cárdenas

Orders
- Consecration: 1657 by Diego Arce Reinoso

Personal details
- Died: 17 June 1658 Palencia, Spain

Antonio de Estrada Manrique (died 17 June 1658) was a Roman Catholic prelate who served as Bishop of Palencia (1657–1658).

== Biography ==
On 19 February 1657, Antonio de Estrada Manrique was selected by the King of Spain as Bishop of Palencia and confirmed by Pope Alexander VII on 18 June 1657. In 1657, he was consecrated bishop by Diego Arce Reinoso, Bishop Emeritus of Plasencia. He served as Bishop of Palencia until his death on 17 June 1658.

== External links and additional sources ==
- Cheney, David M. "Diocese of Palencia". Catholic-Hierarchy.org. (for Chronology of Bishops) ^{[self-published]}
- Chow, Gabriel. "Diocese of Palencia (Spain)". GCatholic.org. (for Chronology of Bishops) ^{[self-published]}

Catholic Church titles
Preceded by Cristóbal Guzmán Santoyo	Bishop of Palencia; 1657–1658	Succeeded by Enrique Peralta y Cárdenas
