= Melchor Soria Vera =

Spanish Roman Catholic prelate

Most Reverend Melchor Soria Vera
- Auxiliary Bishop of Toledo; Titular Bishop of Troas
- Church: Catholic Church
- Archdiocese: Archdiocese of Toledo
- In office: 1602–1643

Personal details
- Died: 1643 Toledo, Spain

Melchor Soria Vera (died 1643) was a Roman Catholic prelate who served as Auxiliary Bishop of Toledo (1602–1643) and Titular Bishop of Troas (1602–1643).

== Biography ==
On 17 June 1602, Melchor Soria Vera was appointed during the papacy of Pope Clement VIII as Auxiliary Bishop of Toledo and Titular Bishop of Troas. He served as Auxiliary Bishop of Toledo until his death in 1643.

While bishop, he was the principal consecrator of Diego Castejón Fonseca, Bishop of Lugo (1634).
