= Alonso Godina =

Spanish Roman Catholic prelate

Most Reverend Alonso Godina
- Titular Bishop of Utica; Auxiliary Bishop of Seville
- Church: Catholic Church
- Archdiocese: Archdiocese of Seville
- In office: 1629–1630

Orders
- Consecration: 1629 by Diego Guzmán de Haros

Personal details
- Died: 28 February 1630 Seville, Spain

Alonso Godina (died 28 February 1630) was a Roman Catholic prelate who served as Auxiliary Bishop of Seville (1629–1630).

== Biography ==
On 20 August 1629, he was selected by the King of Spain and confirmed by Pope Urban VIII as Auxiliary Bishop of Seville and Titular Bishop of Utica. In 1629, he was consecrated bishop by Diego Guzmán de Haros, Archbishop of Seville. He served as Auxiliary Bishop of Seville until his death on 28 February 1630. While bishop, he was the principal co-consecrator of Luis Córdoba Ronquillo, Bishop of Cartagena (1631).

== External links and additional sources ==
- Cheney, David M. "Archdiocese of Sevilla {Seville}". Catholic-Hierarchy.org. (for Chronology of Bishops) ^{[self-published]}
- Chow, Gabriel. "Metropolitan Archdiocese of Sevilla (Italy)". GCatholic.org. (for Chronology of Bishops) ^{[self-published]}
