= Domingo Ramírez de Arellano =

Spanish Roman Catholic prelate

Most Reverend Domingo Ramírez de Arellano
- Bishop of Yucatán
- Church: Catholic Church
- Diocese: Diocese of Yucatán
- In office: 1652–1653
- Predecessor: Marcos de Torres y Rueda
- Successor: Lorenzo Horta Rodríguez
- Previous post: Bishop of Chiapas (1640–1652)

Orders
- Consecration: 24 March 1641 by Timoteo Pérez Vargas

Personal details
- Born: 1568 Villaescusa, Spain
- Died: 2 July 1653 (age 85) Mérida, México

Domingo Ramírez de Arellano, O.S.H. or Domingo de Villaescusa y Ramírez de Arellano (1568 – 2 July 1653) was a Roman Catholic prelate who served as Bishop of Yucatán (1652–1653) and Bishop of Chiapas (1640–1652).

== Biography ==
Domingo Ramírez de Arellano was born in Villaescusa, Spain in 1568 and ordained a priest in the Order of Saint Jerome. On 19 November 1640, he was appointed during the papacy of Pope Urban VIII as Bishop of Chiapas. On 24 March 1641, he was consecrated bishop by Timoteo Pérez Vargas, Titular Bishop of Lystra, with Miguel Avellán, Titular Bishop of Siriensis, and Fernando Montero Espinosa, Bishop of Nueva Segovia, serving as co-consecrators. On 2 December 1652, he was appointed during the papacy of Pope Innocent X as Bishop of Yucatán. He served as Bishop of Yucatán until his death on 2 July 1653.

== External links and additional sources ==
- Cheney, David M. "Diocese of San Cristóbal de Las Casas". Catholic-Hierarchy.org. (for Chronology of Bishops) ^{[self-published]}
- Chow, Gabriel. "Diocese of San Cristóbal de Las Casas". GCatholic.org. (for Chronology of Bishops) ^{[self-published]}
- Cheney, David M. "Archdiocese of Yucatán". Catholic-Hierarchy.org. (for Chronology of Bishops) ^{[self-published]}
- Chow, Gabriel. "Metropolitan Archdiocese of Yucatán". GCatholic.org. (for Chronology of Bishops) ^{[self-published]}

Catholic Church titles
Preceded by Cristóbal Pérez Lazarraga y Maneli Viana	Bishop of Chiapas; 1640–1652	Succeeded by Mauro Diego de Tovar y Valle Maldonado
Preceded by Marcos de Torres y Rueda	Bishop of Yucatán; 1652–1653	Succeeded by Lorenzo Horta Rodríguez
