= Diego Guzmán de Haros =

Spanish catholic cardinal

His Eminence Diego Guzmán de Haros
- Cardinal, Archbishop of Seville
- Church: Roman Catholic
- In office: 1625–1631

Orders
- Created cardinal: 19 November 1629 by Pope Urban VIII

Personal details
- Born: 1566 Ocaña, Spain
- Died: 21 January 1631 (aged 64–65) Ancona, Papal States

Diego Guzmán de Haros (1566 – 21 January 1631) was a cardinal of the Roman Catholic Church from 1629 to 1631.

== Biography ==
Diego Guzmán de Haros was born in Ocaña in 1566. He was educated at the University of Salamanca, completing doctorates in theology and law.

After he was ordained as a priest, he became chaplain of the Discalced Franciscans in Madrid. In 1608, he became a royal chaplain in the household of Philip III of Spain. He became a member of the Supreme Council of the Spanish Inquisition in August 1613. He also became a canon in the cathedral chapter of Cathedral of Toledo. The king also named him preceptor for his daughters the infantas Maria Anna of Spain.

He was named Patriarch of the West Indies on 14 March 1616 and Titular Archbishop of Tyre on 18 April 1616. He was subsequently consecrated as a bishop. On 30 June 1620 Pope Paul V named him Commissary Apostolic of the Bull of the Crusade he issued that year. He was appointed Archbishop of Seville on 15 September 1625.

Pope Urban VIII created him a cardinal in pectore in the consistory held on 19 November 1629. His appointment was published in the consistory of 15 July 1630. In early 1631, he traveled to the Kingdom of Hungary to accompany his former pupil Maria Anna of Spain to her wedding with Ferdinand III, Holy Roman Emperor. On his way home, he was to travel to Rome to receive the galero from the pope, but he died before that could happen, in Ancona, on 21 January 1631. He was initially buried in the Jesuit church in Ancona, and his remains were later returned to Madrid.

== Episcopal succession ==
Episcopal succession of Diego Guzmán de Haros

Guzmán de Haros was the principal consecrator of:

- Luis Camargo Pacheco, Auxiliary Bishop of Seville (1622);
- Iñigo Brizuela Artiaga, Bishop of Segovia (1622);
- Melchor Moscoso Sandoval, Bishop of Segovia (1624);
- Diego Vela Becerril, Bishop of Lugo (1625);
- Juan Arauz Díaz, Bishop of Guadix (1625);
- Fernando Valdés Llano, Bishop of Teruel (1625);
- Juan Venido Castilla, Bishop of Orense (1626);
- Fernando Andrade Sotomayor, Bishop of Palencia, (1628); and
- Alonso Godina, Auxiliary Bishop of Seville (1629).

Catholic Church titles
Preceded by Pedro Manso	Patriarch of West Indies; 1616–1625	Succeeded by Andrés Pacheco
Preceded by Luis Fernández de Córdoba	Archbishop of Seville; 1625–1631	Succeeded by Gaspar de Borja y Velasco
Preceded by	Cardinal In Pectore; 1629–1631	Succeeded by
