= Antonio de Sotomayor =

Spanish Dominican friar and inquisitor general

Antonio de Sotomayor (died 1648) was a Dominican friar who unusually held the positions of royal confessor, councillor of state, commissioner of the crusade, and inquisitor general simultaneously.

Sotomayor was confessor to Philip IV of Spain from 1616 to 1643, and was appointed to the Council of State in 1624, and later to the Comisaría de Cruzada. On 17 July 1632 he also became Inquisitor General of Spain, resigning on 21 June 1643.

Catholic Church titles
Preceded by Antonio Zapata y Cisneros	Grand Inquisitor of Spain; 1632–1643	Succeeded by Diego de Arce y Reinoso
