= Juan Juániz de Echalar =

Roman Catholic Bishop

Most Reverend Juan Juániz de Echalar
- Bishop of Calahorra y La Calzada
- Church: Catholic Church
- Diocese: Diocese of Calahorra y La Calzada
- In office: 1647–1656
- Predecessor: Juan Piñeiro Osorio
- Successor: Martín López de Hontiveros

Orders
- Consecration: 1645 by Diego Arce Reinoso

Personal details
- Died: 13 October 1656

Juan Juániz de Echalar (died 13 October 1656) was a Roman Catholic prelate who served as Bishop of Calahorra y La Calzada (1647–1656) and Bishop of Mondoñedo (1644–1647).

== Biography ==
On 28 November 1644, Juan Juániz de Echalar was selected by the King of Spain and confirmed by Pope Innocent X on 31 July 1645 as Bishop of Mondoñedo. He was consecrated bishop by Diego Arce Reinoso, Bishop of Plasencia, with Miguel Avellán, Titular Bishop of Siriensis, and Pedro Urbina Montoya, Bishop of Coria, serving as co-consecrators. On 16 December 1647, he was appointed during the papacy of Pope Innocent X as Bishop of Calahorra y La Calzada. He served as Bishop of Calahorra y La Calzada until his death on 13 October 1656.

== External links and additional sources ==
- Cheney, David M. "Diocese of Mondoñedo–Ferrol". Catholic-Hierarchy.org. (for Chronology of Bishops) ^{[self-published]}
- Chow, Gabriel. "Diocese of Mondoñedo–Ferrol (Spain)". GCatholic.org. (for Chronology of Bishops) ^{[self-published]}
- Cheney, David M. "Diocese of Calahorra y La Calzada–Logroño". Catholic-Hierarchy.org. (for Chronology of Bishops)^{self-published}
- Chow, Gabriel. "Diocese of Calahorra y La Calzada–Logroño". GCatholic.org. (for Chronology of Bishops)^{self-published}

Catholic Church titles
Preceded by Gonzalo Sánchez de Somoza Quiroga	Bishop of Mondoñedo; 1644–1647	Succeeded by Francisco Torres Grijalba
Preceded by Juan Piñeiro Osorio	Bishop of Calahorra y La Calzada; 1647–1656	Succeeded by Martín López de Hontiveros
