= Cristóbal Guzmán Santoyo =

Spanish Catholic prelate

Most Reverend Cristóbal Guzmán Santoyo
- Bishop of Palencia
- Church: Catholic Church
- Diocese: Diocese of Palencia
- In office: 1633–1656
- Predecessor: Fernando Andrade Sotomayor
- Successor: Antonio de Estrada Manrique

Orders
- Consecration: 29 January 1634 by Martín Carrillo Alderete

Personal details
- Born: 1 November 1578 Guzmán, Spain
- Died: 17 November 1656 (age 78) Palencia, Spain

Cristóbal Guzmán Santoyo (1 November 1578 – 17 November 1656) was a Catholic prelate who served as Bishop of Palencia (1633–1656).

== Biography ==
Cristóbal Guzmán Santoyo was born in Guzmán, Spain on 1 November 1578. On 6 June 1633, he was appointed during the papacy of Pope Urban VIII as Bishop of Palencia. On 29 January 1634, he was consecrated bishop by Martín Carrillo Alderete, Bishop of Oviedo. He served as Bishop of Palencia until his death on 17 November 1656.

== Episcopal succession ==
While bishop, he was the principal consecrator of:

- Bartolomé Santos de Risoba, Bishop of Almería (1634);

and the principal co-consecrator of:

- Gonzalo Sánchez de Somoza Quiroga, Bishop of Mondoñedo (1639); and
- Juan Queipo de Llano Flores, Bishop of Pamplona (1639).

== External links and additional sources ==
- Cheney, David M. "Diocese of Palencia". Catholic-Hierarchy.org. (for Chronology of Bishops) ^{[self-published]}
- Chow, Gabriel. "Diocese of Palencia (Spain)". GCatholic.org. (for Chronology of Bishops) ^{[self-published]}

Catholic Church titles
Preceded by Fernando Andrade Sotomayor	Bishop of Palencia; 1633–1656	Succeeded by Antonio de Estrada Manrique
