= Agustín de Spínola Basadone =

17th-century Roman Catholic cardinal

His Eminence Agustín de Spínola Basadone
- Cardinal-Priest of San Bartolomeo all'Isola; Archbishop of Seville
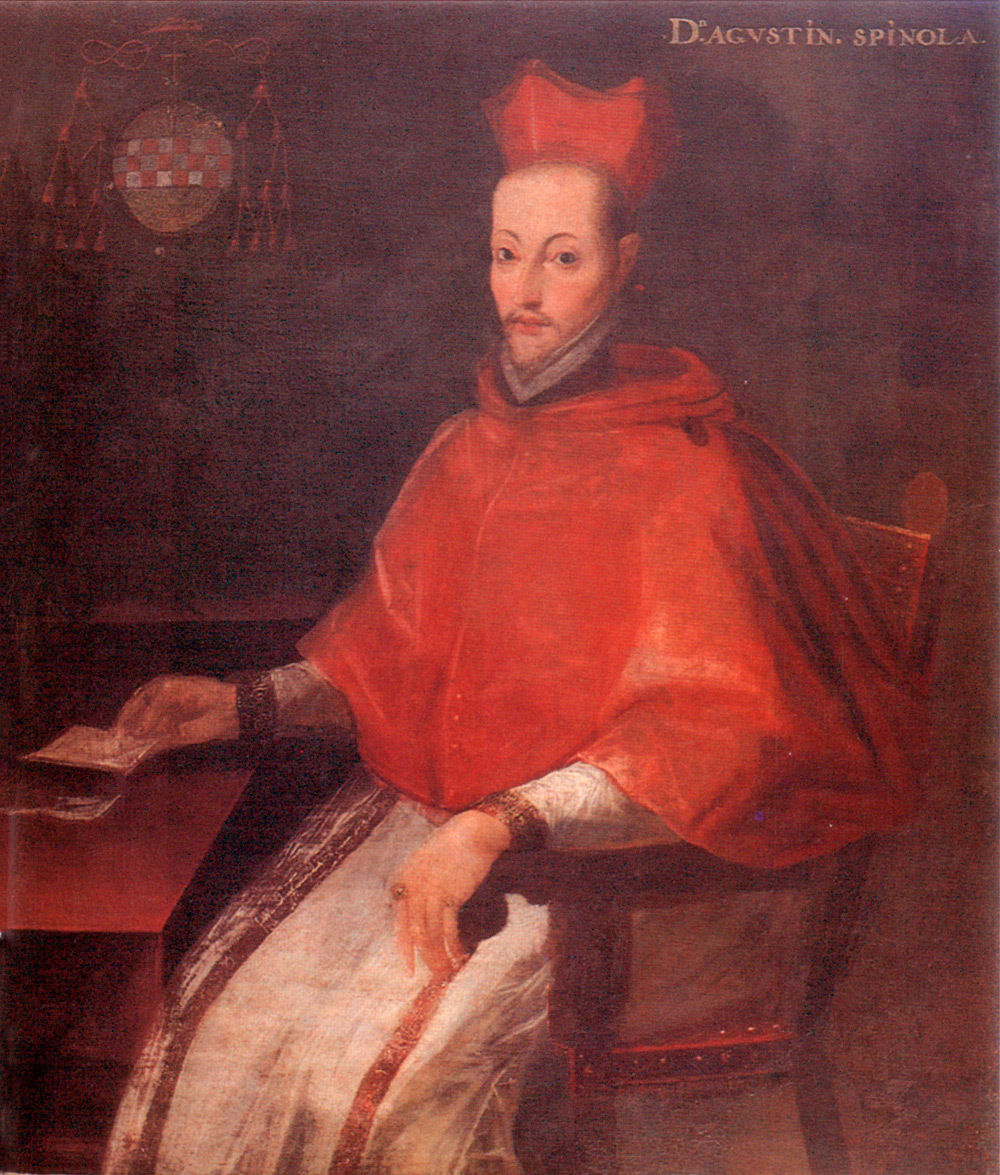
- Engraving by Gilliam van der Gouwen
- Church: Catholic Church

Orders
- Consecration: 30 Apr 1623 by Andrés Pacheco

Personal details
- Born: 1597 Genoa
- Died: 1649 (aged 51–52) Seville

Agustín de Spínola Basadone (Genoa, 1597 – Seville, 1649) was a Spanish cardinal and statesman in the service of Philip IV. He was the son of Ambrogio Spinola, one of the greatest military commanders of his time.

== Career ==
Agustín pursued a career within the church. He was Protonotary apostolic until 1621, when he was made a Cardinal by Pope Paul V. He was Bishop of Tortosa in 1623, Archbishop of Granada in 1626 and Archbishop of Santiago de Compostela in 1630. He stayed in Rome between 1630 and 1635 and was the Camerlengo of the Sacred College of Cardinals in 1632 and 1633. In 1637 Spinola was called to the Spanish Court as a councillor. In 1643, he was captain-general of Galicia for 3 months. In 1645 he became Archbishop of Seville. He served until his death in 1649.

Cardinal Spinola did not participate in any of the Papal conclaves of his time (1621-1644).

Catholic Church titles
Preceded by Luis Tena	Bishop of Tortosa; 1623–1626	Succeeded by Justino Antolínez Burgos
Preceded by Flaminio Piatti	Cardinal-Deacon of Santi Cosma e Damiano; 1623–1631	Succeeded by Alessandro Cesarini (iuniore)
Preceded by Garcerán Albañell	Archbishop of Granada; 1620–1626	Succeeded by Miguel Santos de San Pedro
Preceded by José González Díez	Archbishop of Santiago de Compostela; 1630–1645	Succeeded by Fernando Andrade Sotomayor
Preceded by Gabriel Trejo y Paniagua	Cardinal-Priest of San Bartolomeo all'Isola; 1631–1649	Succeeded by Ottavio Acquaviva d'Aragona (iuniore)
Preceded by Gaspar de Borja y Velasco	Archbishop of Seville; 1645–1649	Succeeded by Domingo Pimentel Zúñiga
