= Francisco Guerra (bishop) =

Spanish Roman Catholic prelate

Most Reverend Francisco Guerra
- Bishop of Plasencia
- Church: Catholic Church
- Diocese: Diocese of Plasencia
- In office: 1655–1656
- Predecessor: Juan Coello Ribera y Sandoval
- Successor: Luis Crespi y Borja
- Previous post: Bishop of Cádiz (1642-1655)

Personal details
- Born: 1587 Villagarcía de Campos, Spain
- Died: 3 December 1657 (age 70) Plasencia, Spain

Francisco Guerra (1587 – 3 December 1657) was a Roman Catholic prelate who served as Bishop of Plasencia (1655–1656) and Bishop of Cádiz (1642–1655).

== Biography ==
Francisco Guerra was born in Villagarcía de Campos, Spain in 1587 and appointed a priest in the Order of Friars Minor. On 17 February 1642, he was selected by the King of Spain and confirmed by Pope Urban VIII as Bishop of Cádiz. On 26 May 1655, he was selected by the King of Spain and confirmed by Pope Alexander VII as Bishop of Plasencia. He served as Bishop of Plasencia until his death on 3 December 1657.

== External links and additional sources ==
- Cheney, David M. "Diocese of Cádiz y Ceuta". Catholic-Hierarchy.org. (for Chronology of Bishops) ^{[self-published]}
- Chow, Gabriel. "Diocese of Cádiz y Ceuta (Spain)". GCatholic.org. (for Chronology of Bishops) ^{[self-published]}
- Cheney, David M. "Diocese of Plasencia". Catholic-Hierarchy.org. (for Chronology of Bishops) ^{[self-published]}
- Chow, Gabriel. "Diocese of Plasencia (Spain)". GCatholic.org. (for Chronology of Bishops) ^{[self-published]}

Catholic Church titles
Preceded by Juan Dionisio Fernández Portocarrero	Bishop of Cádiz; 1642–1655	Succeeded by Fernando de Quesada
Preceded by Juan Coello Ribera y Sandoval	Bishop of Plasencia; 1655–1656	Succeeded by Luis Crespi y Borja
