= Mauro Diego de Tovar y Valle Maldonado =

Spanish Roman Catholic prelate

Most Reverend Mauro Diego de Tovar y Valle Maldonado
- Bishop of Chiapas
- Church: Catholic Church
- Diocese: Diocese of Chiapas
- In office: 1652–1656
- Predecessor: Domingo Ramírez de Arellano
- Successor: Bernardo Cristóbal de Quirós
- Previous post: Bishop of Caracas (1639–1652)

Orders
- Ordination: 13 March 1600
- Consecration: 18 December 1639 by Juan Alonso y Ocón

Personal details
- Born: 1586 Villacastín, Spain
- Died: 22 October 1666 (age 80) Ciudad Real de Chiapas, Mexico

Mauro Diego de Tovar y Valle Maldonado, O.S.B. or Marcos de Tovar y Valle Maldonado (1586 – 22 October 1666) was a Roman Catholic prelate who served as Bishop of Chiapas (1652–1656), and Bishop of Caracas (1639–1652).

== Early life ==
Mauro Diego de Tovar y Valle Maldonado was born in Villacastín, Spain and ordained a priest in the Order of St. Benedict on 13 March 1600. On 3 October 1639, he was selected by the King of Spain and confirmed by Pope Urban VIII as Bishop of Caracas.

On 18 December 1639, he was consecrated bishop by Juan Alonso y Ocón, Bishop of Yucatán with Miguel Avellán, Auxiliary Bishop of Toledo, and Timoteo Pérez Vargas, Bishop of Ispahan, as co-consecrators. On 16 December 1652, he was appointed by Pope Innocent X as Bishop of Chiapas where he served until his death on 22 October 1666.

== Episcopal succession ==
While bishop, he was the principal consecrator of:

- Hernando de Lobo Castrillo, Bishop of Puerto Rico (1650);

and the principal co-consecrator of:

- Juan de Palafox y Mendoza, Bishop of Tlaxcala (1639); and
- Francisco Diego Díaz de Quintanilla y de Hevía y Valdés, Bishop of Durango (1640).

== External links and additional sources ==
- Cheney, David M. "Archdiocese of Caracas, Santiago de Venezuela". Catholic-Hierarchy.org. (for Chronology of Bishops) ^{[self-published]}
- Chow, Gabriel. "Metropolitan Archdiocese of Caracas". GCatholic.org. (for Chronology of Bishops) ^{[self-published]}
- Cheney, David M. "Diocese of San Cristóbal de Las Casas". Catholic-Hierarchy.org. (for Chronology of Bishops) ^{[self-published]}
- Chow, Gabriel. "Diocese of San Cristóbal de Las Casas". GCatholic.org. (for Chronology of Bishops) ^{[self-published]}

Catholic Church titles
Preceded by Juan López de Agurto de la Mata	Bishop of Caracas; 1639–1652	Succeeded by Alonso de Briceño
Preceded by Domingo Ramírez de Arellano	Bishop of Chiapas; 1652–1656	Succeeded by Bernardo Cristóbal de Quirós
