= Antonio Calderón (bishop) =

Spanish Roman Catholic prelate

Most Reverend Antonio Calderón
- Archbishop-elect of Granada
- Church: Catholic Church
- Archdiocese: Archdiocese of Granada
- In office: 1654
- Predecessor: Martín Carrillo Alderete
- Successor: José de Argáiz Pérez

Personal details
- Died: 12 July 1654 Granada, Spain

Antonio Calderón (died 1654) was a Roman Catholic prelate who was appointed as Archbishop-elect of Granada (1654).

On 12 January 1654, Antonio Calderón was appointed during the papacy of Pope Innocent X as Archbishop of Granada. He died before he was consecrated bishop on 12 Jul 1654.

== External links and additional sources ==
- Cheney, David M. "Archdiocese of Granada". Catholic-Hierarchy.org. (for Chronology of Bishops) ^{[self-published]}
- Chow, Gabriel. "Metropolitan Archdiocese of Granada(Spain)". GCatholic.org. (for Chronology of Bishops) ^{[self-published]}

Catholic Church titles
Preceded by Martín Carrillo Alderete	Archbishop-elect of Granada; 1654	Succeeded by José de Argáiz Pérez
