= Diego Rueda Rico =

Spanish Roman Catholic prelate

Most Reverend Diego Rueda Rico
- Bishop of Tui
- Church: Catholic Church
- Diocese: Diocese of Tui
- In office: 1639
- Predecessor: Diego Arce Reinoso
- Successor: Antonio Guzmán Cornejo

Orders
- Consecration: 1639 by Domingo Pimentel Zúñiga

Personal details
- Born: 11 October 1575 Granada, Spain
- Died: 8 December 1639 (aged 64) Tui, Spain

Diego Rueda Rico (11 October 1575 – 8 December 1639) was a Roman Catholic prelate who served as Bishop of Tui (1639).

== Biography ==
Diego Rueda Rico was born in Granada, Spain on 11 October 1575. On 7 February 1639, he was appointed during the papacy of Pope Urban VIII as Bishop of Tui. In 1639, he was consecrated bishop by Domingo Pimentel Zúñiga, Bishop of Córdoba, with Miguel Avellán, Titular Bishop of Siriensis, and Juan Alonso y Ocón, Bishop of Yucatán, serving as co-consecrators. He served as Bishop of Tui until his death on 8 December 1639.

== External links and additional sources ==
- Cheney, David M. "Diocese of Tui-Vigo". Catholic-Hierarchy.org. (for Chronology of Bishops) ^{[self-published]}
- Chow, Gabriel. "Diocese of Tui-Vigo (Spain)". GCatholic.org. (for Chronology of Bishops) ^{[self-published]}

Catholic Church titles
| Preceded by Diego Arce Reinoso | Bishop of Tui; 1639 | Succeeded by Antonio Guzmán Cornejo |
