= Jean Duval =

Spanish Roman Catholic prelate

Most Reverend Jean Duval
- Bishop of Baghdad
- Church: Catholic Church
- Archdiocese: Diocese of Baghdad
- In office: 1638–1669
- Predecessor: Timoteo Pérez Vargas
- Successor: Placide-Louis du Chemin
- Previous post: Bishop of Ispahan (1632-1639).

Orders
- Consecration: 22 August 1638 by Giovanni Battista Maria Pallotta

Personal details
- Born: 22 April 1597 Clamecy, France
- Died: 10 April 1669 (age 71) Baghdad

Jean Duval, OCD (22 April 1597 – 10 April 1669) was a Discalced Carmelite and a Roman Catholic prelate who served as the second Bishop of Baghdad (1638–1669) and Bishop of Ispahan (1638–1669).

== Biography ==
Jean Duval was born in Clamecy, France on 22 April 1597 and was ordained a priest in the Order of Discalced Carmelites. On 16 August 1638, he was appointed during the papacy of Pope Urban VIII as Bishop of Baghdad. On 22 August 1638, he was consecrated bishop by Giovanni Battista Maria Pallotta, Cardinal-Priest of San Silvestro in Capite, with Antonio Severoli, Archbishop of Dubrovnik, and Tommaso Carafa, Bishop Emeritus of Vulturara e Montecorvino, serving as co-consecrators. On 25 September 1638, he was appointed during the papacy of Pope Urban VIII as Bishop of Ispahan. He served as Bishop of Baghdad and Bishop of Ispahan until his death on 10 April 1669.

Catholic Church titles
Preceded by Timoteo Pérez Vargas	Bishop of Baghdad; 1633–1639	Succeeded by Laurent Elias Mouton
Preceded by Timoteo Pérez Vargas	Bishop of Ispahan; 1632–1639	Succeeded by Placide-Louis du Chemin
