= Miguel Ferrer (bishop) =

Most Reverend Miguel Ferrer
- Bishop of Tui
- Church: Catholic Church
- Diocese: Diocese of Tui
- In office: 1657–1659
- Predecessor: Juan Pérez de Vega
- Successor: Juan Pérez Gutiérrez

Orders
- Consecration: 12 August 1657

Personal details
- Born: 1591 Pamplona, Spain
- Died: 23 March 1659 (age 68) Tui, Spain

Miguel Ferrer (1591–1659) was a Roman Catholic prelate who served as Bishop of Tui (1657–1659).

== Biography ==
Miguel Ferrer was born in Pamplona, Spain in 1591. On 10 September 1656, he was selected by the King of Spain and confirmed by Pope Alexander VII on 12 March 1657 as Bishop of Tui. On 12 August 1657, he was consecrated bishop. He served as Bishop of Tui until his death on 23 March 1659.

== External links and additional sources ==
- Cheney, David M. "Diocese of Tui-Vigo". Catholic-Hierarchy.org. (for Chronology of Bishops) ^{[self-published]}
- Chow, Gabriel. "Diocese of Tui-Vigo (Spain)". GCatholic.org. (for Chronology of Bishops) ^{[self-published]}

Catholic Church titles
Preceded by Juan Pérez de Vega	Bishop of Tui; 1657–1659	Succeeded by Juan Pérez Gutiérrez
