= Pedro Orozco =

Spanish Roman Catholic prelate

Most Reverend Pedro Orozco
- Auxiliary Bishop of Toledo
- Church: Catholic Church
- Archdiocese: Archdiocese of Toledo
- In office: 1643–1678?

Orders
- Consecration: 1644

Personal details
- Born: 1590 Alfaro, Spain
- Died: Unknown

Pedro Orozco (born 1590) was a Roman Catholic prelate who served as Auxiliary Bishop of Toledo (1643–1678?).

== Biography ==
Pedro Orozco was born in Alfaro, Spain in 1590 and ordained a priest in the Order of Friars Minor. On 14 Dec 1643, he was appointed during the papacy of Pope Urban VIII as Auxiliary Bishop of Toledo and Titular Bishop of Temnus. In 1644, he was consecrated bishop. While bishop, he was the principal co-consecrator of Juan Ortiz de Zárate (bishop), Bishop of Salamanca (1645); Jerónimo de Ipenza, Bishop of Jaca (1650); Juan Bravo Lasprilla, Bishop of Lugo (1652); and Juan Herrero Jaraba, Bishop of Badajoz (1678).
