= Lucas Ramírez Galán =

Roman Catholic archbishop (1715–1774)

The Most Reverend Lucas Ramírez Galán OFM
- Bishop of Tui
- Church: Catholic Church
- Diocese: Tui
- Appointed: 12 December 1770 by Pope Clement XIV
- Term ended: 19 March 1774
- Predecessor: Antonio Fernández Tobar
- Successor: Domingo Ramón Fernández Angulo

Personal details
- Born: 18 October 1715 Belalcázar, Spain
- Died: 19 March 1774 (aged 58)

Ordination history of Lucas Ramírez Galán
History
Episcopal consecration
- Principal consecrator: Francisco de Solís Folch de Cardona
- Co-consecrators: Francisco Alejandro Bocanegra Jivaja; Domingo Pérez Rivera

Lucas Ramírez Galán, OFM (18 October 1715 – 19 March 1774) was a Spanish Roman Catholic archbishop. He served as Bishop of Tui from 1770 to 1774. Previously, he served as Archbishop of Bogotá from 1769 to 1770 and Auxiliary Bishop of Cartagena from 1761 to 1769.

== Biography ==
Ramírez was born in Belalcázar, Spain, on 18 October 1715.

On 6 April 1761, he was appointed Auxiliary Bishop of Cartagena and Titular Bishop of Tanis. His episcopal consecration was held on 31 May 1761, with Cardinal Francisco de Solís Folch de Cardona serving as principal consecrator, and bishops Francisco Alejandro Bocanegra Jivaja and Domingo Pérez Rivera serving as co-consecrators. On 12 June 1769, he was appointed Bishop of Chiapas in New Spain (today part of Mexico). However, he never ultimately arrived in Chiapas to take leadership of the diocese.

On 15 July 1769 he was selected, and on 21 August confirmed, as the Archbishop of Santafé en Nueva Granada (today Bogotá). He served as archbishop until 12 December 1770, when he was appointed Bishop of Tui, Spain. He died on 19 March 1774. During his life, he served as the co-consecrator of three bishops: Cardinal Francisco Javier Delgado y Venegas in 1761, Bishop Juan Bautista Cervera, OFMDisc., in 1769, and Archbishop Joaquín de Eleta, OFM, in 1770).

== Episcopal lineage ==
Galán's episcopal lineage is listed as follows, with each bishop's year of consecration parenthesized:

- Cardinal Scipione Rebiba
- Cardinal Giulio Antonio Santorio (1566)
- Cardinal Girolamo Bernerio, OP (1586)
- Archbishop Galeazzo Sanvitale (1604)
- Cardinal Ludovico Ludovisi (1621)
- Cardinal Luigi Caetani (1622)
- Cardinal Ulderico Carpegna (1630)
- Cardinal Paluzzo Paluzzi Altieri degli Albertoni (1666)
- Pope Benedict XIII (1675)
- Pope Benedict XIV (1724)
- Archbishop Enrico Enríquez (1743)
- Cardinal Francisco de Solís Folch de Cardona (1749)
- Archbishop Lucas Ramírez Galán (1761)

== External links and additional sources ==
- Cheney, David M. "Archdiocese of Bogotá". Catholic-Hierarchy.org. (for Chronology of Bishops) ^{[self-published]}
- Chow, Gabriel. "Metropolitan Archdiocese of Bogotá (Colombia)". GCatholic.org. (for Chronology of Bishops) ^{[self-published]}
