= Felipe Tarsis de Acuña =

Spanish Roman Catholic prelate

Most Reverend Felipe Tarsis de Acuña
- Archbishop of Granada
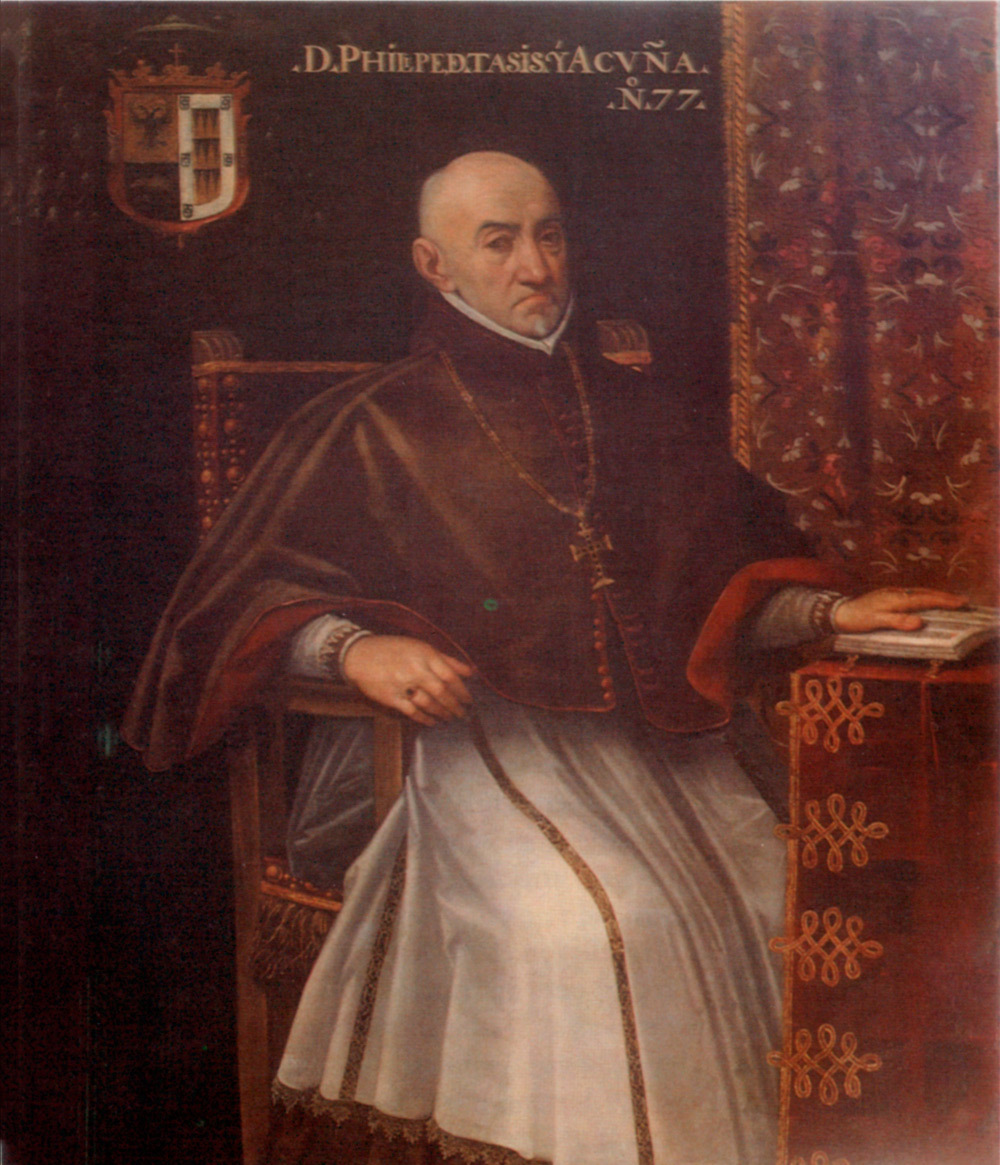
- Church: Catholic Church
- Archdiocese: Archdiocese of Granada
- In office: 1616–1620
- Predecessor: Pedro González de Mendoza
- Successor: Garcerán Albañell
- Previous post: Bishop of Palencia (1608–1616)

Personal details
- Born: 1548 Valladolid, Spain
- Died: 20 June 1620 (age 72) Granada, Spain

Felipe Tarsis de Acuña, O.S. (1548 – 20 June 1620) was a Roman Catholic prelate who served as Archbishop of Granada (1616–1620) and Bishop of Palencia (1608–1616).

== Biography ==
Felipe Tarsis de Acuña was born in Valladolid, Spain in 1548 and ordained a priest in the Order of Santiago. On 11 February 1608, he was appointed during the papacy of Pope Paul V as Bishop of Palencia. On 24 February 1616, he was appointed during the papacy of Pope Paul V as Archbishop of Granada. He served as Archbishop of Granada until his death on 20 June 1620. While bishop, he was the principal co-consecrator of Alonso González Aguilar, Bishop of León (1613).

== External links and additional sources ==
- Cheney, David M. "Diocese of Palencia". Catholic-Hierarchy.org. (for Chronology of Bishops) ^{[self-published]}
- Chow, Gabriel. "Diocese of Palencia (Spain)". GCatholic.org. (for Chronology of Bishops) ^{[self-published]}
- Cheney, David M. "Archdiocese of Granada". Catholic-Hierarchy.org. (for Chronology of Bishops) ^{[self-published]}
- Chow, Gabriel. "Metropolitan Archdiocese of Granada(Spain)". GCatholic.org. (for Chronology of Bishops) ^{[self-published]}

Catholic Church titles
Preceded by Martín Aspi Sierra	Bishop of Palencia; 1608–1616	Succeeded by José González Díez
Preceded by Pedro González de Mendoza	Archbishop of Granada; 1616–1620	Succeeded by Garcerán Albañell
