= Francisco Diego Alarcón y Covarrubias =

Spanish religious man

Most Reverend Francisco Diego Alarcón y Covarrubias
- Bishop of Córdoba
- Church: Catholic Church
- In office: 1657–1675
- Predecessor: Antonio Valdés Herrera
- Successor: Alfonso de Salizanes y Medina
- Previous posts: Bishop of Ciudad Rodrigo (1639–1645); Bishop of Salamanca (1645–1648); Bishop of Pamplona (1648–1657)

Orders
- Consecration: 18 September 1639 by Diego Castejón Fonseca

Personal details
- Born: 29 March 1589 Valladolid, Spain
- Died: 18 May 1675 (age 86) Córdoba, Spain

Francisco Diego Alarcón y Covarrubias or Francisco Díaz Alarcón y Covarrubias (29 March 1589 – 18 May 1675) was a Roman Catholic prelate who served as Bishop of Córdoba (1657–1675), Bishop of Pamplona (1648–1657), Bishop of Salamanca (1645–1648), and Bishop of Ciudad Rodrigo (1639–1645).

== Biography ==
Francisco Diego Alarcón y Covarrubias was born in Valladolid, Spain on 29 March 1589. On 11 Apr 1639, he was appointed during the papacy of Pope Urban VIII as Bishop of Ciudad Rodrigo. On 18 September 1639, he was consecrated bishop by Diego Castejón Fonseca, Bishop Emeritus of Lugo, with Juan Alonso y Ocón, Bishop of Yucatán, and Timoteo Pérez Vargas, Bishop of Ispahan, serving as co-consecrators. On 18 October 1645, he was appointed during the papacy of Pope Innocent X as Bishop of Salamanca. On 1 March 1648, he was selected by the King of Spain and confirmed by Pope Innocent X on 6 Jul 1648 as Bishop of Pamplona. On 24 September 1657, he was appointed during the papacy of Pope Alexander VII as Bishop of Córdoba. He served as Bishop of Córdoba until his death on 18 May 1675.

== External links and additional sources ==
- Cheney, David M. "Diocese of Ciudad Rodrigo". Catholic-Hierarchy.org. (for Chronology of Bishops)^{self-published}
- Chow, Gabriel. "Diocese of Ciudad Rodrigo (Spain)". GCatholic.org. (for Chronology of Bishops)^{self-published}
- Cheney, David M. "Diocese of Salamanca". Catholic-Hierarchy.org. (for Chronology of Bishops)^{self-published}
- Chow, Gabriel. "Diocese of Salamanca (Spain)". GCatholic.org. (for Chronology of Bishops)^{self-published}
- Cheney, David M. "Archdiocese of Pamplona y Tudela". Catholic-Hierarchy.org. (for Chronology of Bishops)^{self-published}
- Chow, Gabriel. "Metropolitan Archdiocese of Pamplona y Tudela (Spain)". GCatholic.org. (for Chronology of Bishops)^{self-published}
- Cheney, David M. "Diocese of Córdoba". Catholic-Hierarchy.org. (for Chronology of Bishops) ^{[self-published]}
- Chow, Gabriel. "Diocese of Córdoba". GCatholic.org. (for Chronology of Bishops) ^{[self-published]}

Catholic Church titles
Preceded by Juan de la Torre Ayala	Bishop of Ciudad Rodrigo; 1639–1645	Succeeded by Juan Pérez Delgado
Preceded by Juan Ortiz de Zárate (bishop)	Bishop of Salamanca; 1645–1648	Succeeded by Pedro Carrillo Acuña y Bureba
Preceded by Juan Piñeiro Osorio	Bishop of Pamplona; 1648–1657	Succeeded by Diego de Tejada y la Guardia
Preceded by Antonio Valdés Herrera	Bishop of Córdoba; 1657–1675	Succeeded by Alfonso de Salizanes y Medina
