= Timoteo Pérez Vargas =

Spanish Roman Catholic prelate

Most Reverend Timoteo Pérez Vargas
- Bishop of Baghdad
- Church: Catholic Church
- Archdiocese: Diocese of Baghdad
- In office: 1633–1639
- Predecessor: None
- Successor: Jean Duval
- Previous post: Bishop of Ispahan (1632–1639).

Orders
- Consecration: 19 September 1632 by Bernardino Spada

Personal details
- Born: 1595 Palermo, Kingdom of Sicily (then part of the Crown of Aragon)
- Died: 5 April 1651 (aged 55–56)

Timoteo Pérez Vargas, OCD (1595 – 5 April 1651) was a Roman Catholic prelate who served as the first Bishop of Baghdad (1633–1639) and the second Bishop of Ispahan (1632–1639).

== Biography ==
Timoteo Pérez Vargas was born in Palermo, Kingdom of Sicily and was ordained a priest in the Order of Discalced Carmelites on 8 June 1612. 6 September 1632 he was selected by the King of Spain and confirmed by Pope Urban VIII as Coadjutor Bishop of Ispahan. On 6 September 1632 he was selected by the King of Spain and confirmed by Pope Urban VIII as Bishop of Baghdad. On 19 September 1632 he was consecrated bishop by Bernardino Spada, Cardinal-Priest Santo Stefano al Monte Celio. On 5 September 1633 he succeeded to the Bishopric of Ispahan. On 23 December 1639 he resigned as Bishop of Baghdad and as Bishop of Ispahan and was appointed Titular Bishop of Lystra. He died on 5 April 1651.

== Episcopal succession ==
Episcopal succession of Timoteo Pérez Vargas

While bishop, he was the principal consecrator of:

- Domingo Ramírez de Arellano, Bishop of Chiapas (1641); and
- Pedro Rosales Encio, Bishop of Lugo (1641);

and the principal co-consecrator of:

- Facundo de la Torre, Archbishop of Santo Domingo (1632);
- Antonio González Acevedo, Bishop of Almería (1634);
- Diego Castejón Fonseca, Bishop of Lugo (1634);
- Diego Serrano Sotomayor, Bishop of Solsona (1636);
- Juan Velasco Acevedo, Bishop of Orense (1637);
- Juan Alonso y Ocón, Bishop of Yucatán (1638);
- Francisco Diego Alarcón y Covarrubias, Bishop of Ciudad Rodrigo (1639);
- Cesare Facchinetti, Apostolic Nuncio to Spain (1639);
- Juan Coello Ribera y Sandoval, Bishop of Zamora (1639);
- Mauro Diego de Tovar y Valle Maldonado, Bishop of Caracas, Santiago de Venezuela (1639);
- Hernando de Ramírez y Sánchez, Bishop of Panamá (1642);
- Juan Piñeiro Osorio, Bishop of Calahorra y La Calzada (1643);
- Antonio Paiño Sevilla, Bishop of Orense (1643);
- Juan Sánchez Alonso de Guevara, Bishop of Lugo (1643);
- Pedro Urbina Montoya, Bishop of Coria (1644);
- Juan del Pozo Horta, Bishop of Lugo (1646); and
- Francisco Pio Guadalupe Téllez, Archbishop of Santo Domingo (1649).

He also presided over the priestly ordination of:

- Diego Lozano González, Order of the Brothers of the Blessed Virgin Mary of Mount Carmel (1646).

Catholic Church titles
Preceded by Juan Boldames Ibáñez	Bishop of Ispahan; 1632–1639	Succeeded by Jean Duval
Preceded by New title	Bishop of Baghdad; 1633–1639	Succeeded by Jean Duval
