= Antonio Zapata y Cisneros =

Spanish bishop

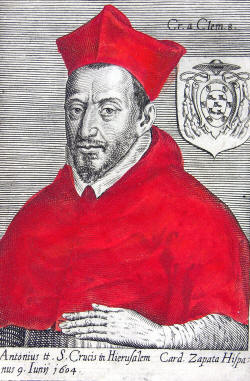

Orders
- Consecration: 1587
- Created cardinal: 6 June 1604 by Clement VIII

Personal details
- Born: 8 October 1550 Madrid
- Died: 27 April 1635 (aged 84) Madrid

Antonio Zapata y Cisneros, also listed as Zapata y Mendoza, (Madrid, 8 October 1550 – Madrid, c. 27 April 1635) was a Spanish bishop. He served as bishop of Cádiz and Pamplona, archbishop of Burgos, cardinal, councillor of state for Philip III, Viceroy of Naples, and Inquisitor General of the realm.

== Life ==
=== Ecclesiastical career ===
He was the first child of Francisco Zapata de Cisneros, 1st Count of Barajas, and María Clara de Mendoza; and a grand-nephew of Cardinal Cisneros.

He studied at Salamanca, graduating with a degree in Canon Law. He was named a canon and inquisitor of Toledo and later of Cuenca, where his uncle Gómez Zapata was the bishop. In July 1587 he renounced the noble title he had inherited by right of primogeniture in favor of his brother Diego, and in November that year he was made bishop of Cádiz at the urging of Philip II, and consecrated by Cardinal Gaspar de Quiroga. During his episcopate he ordered the raising of part of the city walls at his own expense.

In May 1596 he was sent to the diocese of Pamplona. In 1599 he was named a councillor of state, and in September the following year Philip III made him archbishop of Burgos, in which post he contributed to the ornamentation of the city's cathedral.

In June 1604 Pope Clement VIII named him a cardinal, after which he resigned from the office of archbishop and moved to Rome, where he lived for the following years. He participated in the conclave of 1605 in which Pope Paul V was elected and was the inquisitor of the city.

In 1617 he returned to Spain, bringing with him the remains of Saint Francis Borgia. Two years later he bestowed the cardinal's galero on Prince Ferdinand of Austria.

=== Viceroy of Naples ===
In September 1620 Philip III gave him the post of Viceroy of Naples, where he arrived at the end of the year. At the death of Pope Paul V the following month, Zapata traveled to Rome, where he participated in the conclave in which the new pope Gregory XV was elected; in his absence of less than a month Naples was governed by Pedro de Toledo, general of the king's galleys.

During the viceroyalty of Zapata the country suffered serious inflation caused by the systematic counterfeiting of the currency. Inclement weather, which left the kingdom isolated for several months, thereby hindering commerce, added to the precarious situation of the Neapolitans, who protested angrily against his government, leading on several occasions to physical aggression against the viceroy. In December 1622 Zapata was succeeded in his post by Antonio Álvarez de Toledo y Beaumont, 5th Duke of Alba.

=== Return to Spain ===
After his return to Spain, in 1625 he was entrusted with the administration of the Archdiocese of Toledo during the minority of the titular archbishop, Cardinal-Prince Ferdinand of Austria. In a bull issued in January 1627 by Pope Urban VIII he received the post of inquisitor general of the kingdom. Five years later, now an octogenarian, his advanced age led him to resign from all his posts and retire to Barajas. Afflicted with an illness which hindered his speech, he was taken to Madrid, where he died in April 1635. His remains were buried in the Discalced Carmelite monastery of Our Lady of the Conception, founded by his father in Barajas.

He wrote a book entitled Discurso de la obligación en conciencia y justicia que los prelados tienen en proveer las dignidades y beneficios eclesiásticos ("Discourse on the prelate's obligation of conscience and justice in the provision of ecclesiastical offices and benefits"), dedicated to the Cardinal-Prince. It was published in Madrid in 1629.

Catholic Church titles
Preceded by Luis García Haro de Sotomayor	Bishop of Cádiz; 1587–1596	Succeeded by Maximilian of Austria
Preceded by Bernardo de Sandoval y Rojas	Bishop of Pamplona; 1596–1600	Succeeded by Mateo Burgos Moraleja
Preceded by Cristóbal Vela y Acuña	Archbishop of Burgos; 1600–1604	Succeeded by Alfonso Manrique
Preceded by Robert Bellarmine	Cardinal-Priest of San Matteo in Via Merulana; 1605–1606	Succeeded by Roberto Ubaldini
Preceded by Ascanio Colonna	Cardinal-Priest of Santa Croce in Gerusalemme; 1606–1616	Succeeded by Gaspar de Borja y Velasco
Preceded by Pompeio Arrigoni	Cardinal-Priest of Santa Balbina; 1616–1635	Succeeded by Alfonso de la Cueva, 1st Marquis of Bedmar
Preceded by Andrés Pacheco	Grand Inquisitor of Spain; 1627 - 1632	Succeeded by Antonio de Sotomayor
Military offices
Preceded by Gaspar de Borja y Velasco	Viceroy of Naples; 16 December 1620 – 22 December 1622	Succeeded by Antonio Álvarez de Toledo y Beaumont
