= Luis Camargo Pacheco =

Spanish Roman Catholic prelate

Most Reverend Luis Camargo Pacheco
- Titular Bishop of Centuria; Auxiliary Bishop of Seville
- Church: Catholic Church
- Archdiocese: Archdiocese of Seville

Orders
- Consecration: 1622 by Diego Guzmán de Haros

Personal details
- Born: 1582 Seville, Spain
- Died: 29 March 1665 (age 83) Seville, Spain

Luis Camargo Pacheco (1582 – 29 March 1665) was a Roman Catholic prelate who served as Auxiliary Bishop of Seville (1622–1665).

== Biography ==
Luis Camargo Pacheco was born in Seville, Spain in 1582. On 11 July 1622, he was selected by the King of Spain and confirmed by Pope Gregory XV as Auxiliary Bishop of Seville and Titular Bishop of Centuria. In 1622, he was consecrated bishop by Diego Guzmán de Haros, Patriarch of the West Indies. He served as Auxiliary Bishop of Seville until his death on 29 March 1665.

== Episcopal succession ==
While bishop, he was the principal co-consecrator of

- Fernando Andrade Sotomayor, Bishop of Palencia (1628);
- Luis Córdoba Ronquillo, Bishop of Cartagena (1631);
- Mendo de Benavides, Bishop of Segovia (1634); and
- Juan Queipo de Llano y Valdés (bishop), Bishop of Guadix (1640).

== See also ==
- Catholic Church in Spain

== External links and additional sources ==
- Cheney, David M. "Archdiocese of Sevilla {Seville}". Catholic-Hierarchy.org. (for Chronology of Bishops) ^{[self-published]}
- Chow, Gabriel. "Metropolitan Archdiocese of Sevilla (Italy)". GCatholic.org. (for Chronology of Bishops) ^{[self-published]}
