= Diego Castejón Fonseca =

Spanish Roman Catholic prelate

Most Reverend Diego Castejón Fonseca
- Bishop of Tarazona
- Church: Catholic Church
- Diocese: Diocese of Tarazona
- In office: 1643–1655
- Predecessor: Baltasar Navarro Arroytia
- Successor: Pedro Manero
- Previous post: Bishop of Lugo (1634–1636)

Orders
- Consecration: 2 July 1634 by Melchor Soria Vera

Personal details
- Born: 1580 Madrid, Spain
- Died: 19 February 1655 (age 75) Tarazona, Spain

Diego Castejón Fonseca (1580 – 19 February 1655) was a Roman Catholic prelate who served as Bishop of Tarazona (1643–1655) and Bishop of Lugo (1634–1636).

== Biography ==
Diego Castejón Fonseca was born in Madrid, Spain in 1580. On 9 January 1634, he was appointed during the papacy of Pope Urban VIII as Bishop of Lugo. On 2 July 1634, he was consecrated bishop by Melchor Soria Vera, Titular Bishop of Troas, with Miguel Avellán, Titular Bishop of Siriensis, and Timoteo Pérez Vargas, Bishop of Ispahan, serving as co-consecrators. On 1 May 1636, he resigned as Bishop of Lugo.

In June 1640, he became President of the Council of Castile. On 28 March 1643, he was selected by the King of Spain and confirmed on 23 May 1644 by Pope Urban VIII as Bishop of Tarazona. He served as Bishop of Tarazona until his death on 19 February 1655.

== Episcopal succession ==
Episcopal succession of Diego Castejón Fonseca

While bishop, he was the principal consecrator of:

- Juan Alonso y Ocón, Bishop of Yucatán (1638);
- Francisco Diego Alarcón y Covarrubias, Bishop of Ciudad Rodrigo (1639);
- Cesare Facchinetti, Titular Archbishop of Tamiathis (1639);
- Juan Coello Ribera y Sandoval, Bishop of Zamora (1639); and
- Hernando de Ramírez y Sánchez, Bishop of Panamá (1642).

== External links and additional sources ==
- Cheney, David M. "Diocese of Lugo". Catholic-Hierarchy.org. (for Chronology of Bishops) ^{[self-published]}
- Chow, Gabriel. "Diocese of Lugo (Spain)". GCatholic.org. (for Chronology of Bishops) ^{[self-published]}
- Cheney, David M. "Diocese of Tarazona". Catholic-Hierarchy.org. (for Chronology of Bishops) ^{[self-published]}
- Chow, Gabriel. "Diocese of Tarazona (Spain)". GCatholic.org. (for Chronology of Bishops) ^{[self-published]}

Catholic Church titles
Preceded by Juan del Águila Velázquez	Bishop of Lugo; 1634–1636	Succeeded by Juan Vélez de Valdivielso
Preceded by Baltasar Navarro Arroytia	Bishop of Tarazona; 1643–1655	Succeeded by Pedro Manero
