= Juan Bautista Valenzuela Velázquez =

Spanish jurist

Most Reverend Juan Bautista Valenzuela Velázquez
- Bishop of Salamanca
- Church: Catholic Church
- Diocese: Diocese of Salamanca
- In office: 1642–1645
- Predecessor: Cristóbal de la Cámara y Murga
- Successor: Juan Ortiz de Zárate

Orders
- Consecration: 27 July 1642 by Martín Carrillo Alderete

Personal details
- Born: 24 June 1574 Cuenca, Spain
- Died: 2 February 1645 (age 70) Salamanca, Spain

Juan Bautista Valenzuela Velázquez (24 June 1574 – 2 February 1645) was a Spanish jurist who served on the Sacro regio consiglio and Consiglio collaterale of Naples, on the Council of Italy, on the Council of Castile and as president of the Royal Chancellery of Granada. He was also the Roman Catholic bishop of Salamanca from 1642 to 1645.

== Biography ==
Juan Valenzuela Velázquez was born in Cuenca, Spain on 24 June 1574. On 24 March 1642, he was appointed during the papacy of Pope Urban VIII as bishop of Salamanca. On 27 July 1642, he was consecrated bishop by Martín Carrillo Alderete, Archbishop of Granada, with Juan Queipo de Llano y Valdés, Bishop of Guadix, and Blas Tineo Palacios, titular bishop of Thermopylae, serving as co-consecrators. He served as bishop of Salamanca until his death on 2 February 1645.

== Works ==
- Defensio iustitiae et iustificationis monitorii emissi & promulgati per SS.D.N.D. Paulum Papam Quintum XVII die mensis aprilis anno D[omi]ni MDCVI aduersus Ducem & Senatum Reipub. Venetorum super quibusdam statutis & decretis ab eisdem editis contra Sanctae Apostolicae Sedis authoritatem & libertatem ac inmunitatem ecclesiasticam (Valencia, 1607)
- Discurso en comprobacion de la santidad de vida, y milagros del glorioso San Iulian, secundo obisbo de Cuenca (Cuenca, 1611)
- Consilia seu iuris responsa D. Ioannis Baptistae Valenzuela Velazquez (Naples, 1618)
- De status, ac belli ratione seruanda cum Belgis, siueinferioris Germaniae prouincijs. Alijsque a legitimo suorum principum dominio, & obedientia rebellantibus. Discursus, & animaduersiones. D. Ioannis Baptistae Valenzuela Velazquez nobilis Hispani (Naples, 1620)
- Consiliorum sive responsorum iuris D. Ioannis Baptistae Valenzuela Velazquez [...] liber secundus cui accessere in calce Additiones ad primum (Naples, 1634)
- Discurso que hizo el Señor Dotor don Iuan Bautista Valençuela Velazquez, de el Consejo de su Magestad en el Supremo de Castilla, i su Gouernador Presidente de la Real Chancilleria de Granada, siendo Regente del Consejo Supremo de Italia, sobre la precedencia del dicho Consejo, i Regentes del, al Consejo, i Consejeros de Portugal (Granada, 1634)
- Discurso del señor doctor Iuan Baptista Valenzuela Velazquez [...] en razon de las conuenencias que ay para que su Magestad [...] ampare las letras, y professores dellas y no consienta que a los libros se carge alcauala, ni otra imposicion (Seville, 1638)
- Acta et scripta varia controuersiae memorabilis inter Paulum V Pontificem Maximum et Venetos (1728)
- Memorias sobre el Concilio de Trento (unpublished)

Catholic Church titles
Preceded by Cristóbal de la Cámara y Murga	Bishop of Salamanca; 1642–1645	Succeeded by Juan Ortiz de Zárate
