= Villadiezma =

Coordinates: 42°23′43″N 04°24′37″W

Villadiezma, Spain
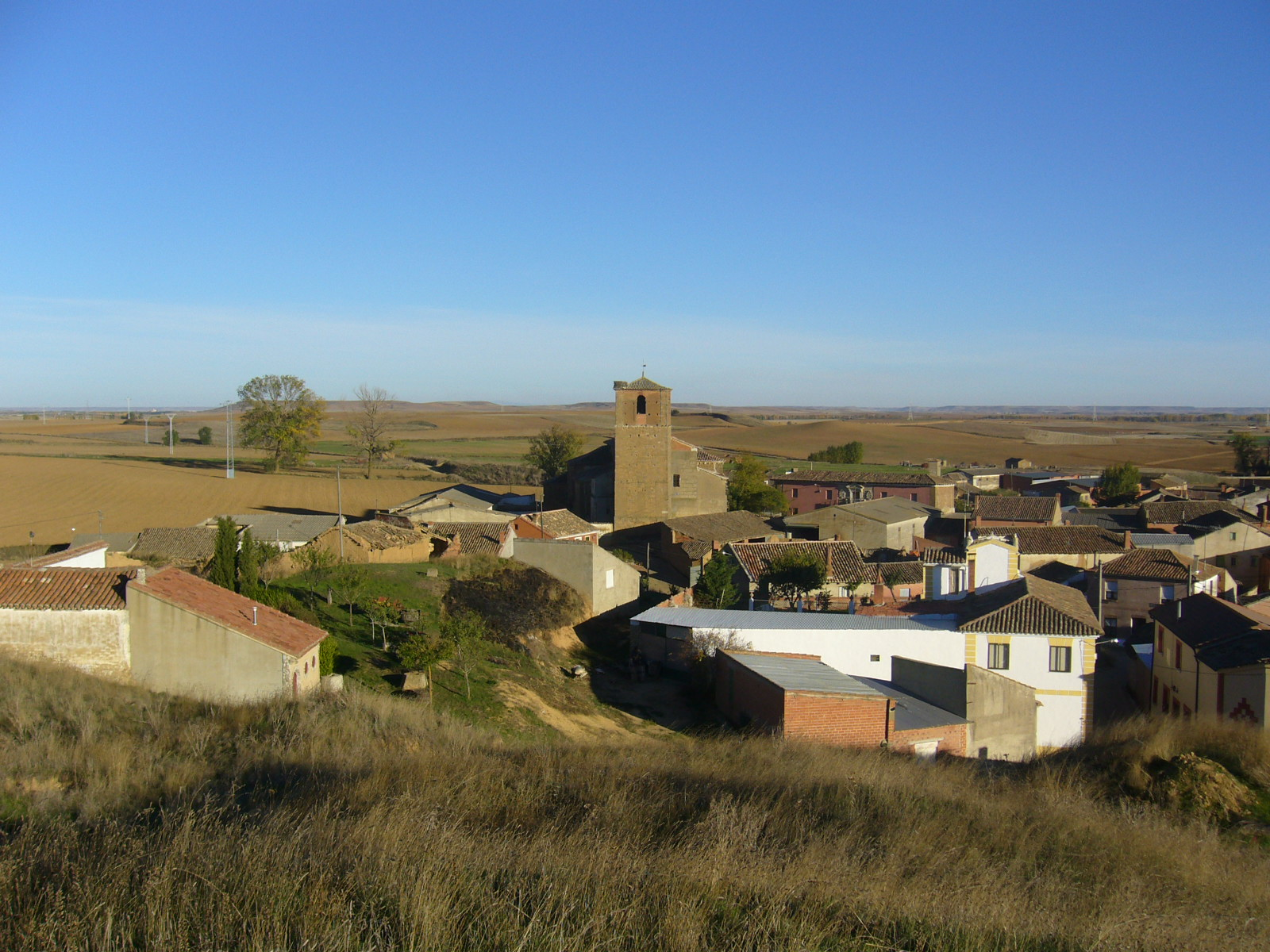

- Seal
- Nickname: de
- Interactive map of Villadiezma, Spain
- Country: Spain
- Autonomous community: Castile and León
- Province: Palencia
- Municipality: Osorno la Mayor

Population
  - Total: 90
- Time zone: UTC+1 (CET)
  - Summer (DST): UTC+2 (CEST)

Villadiezma is a hamlet of Osorno la Mayor located in the province of Palencia, Castile and León, Spain. According to the 2007 census (INE), the village has a population of 90 inhabitants.
