= Gabriel Trejo Paniagua =

Spanish bishop and cardinal

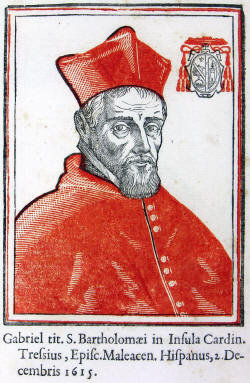
Gabriel Trejo Paniagua

Gabriel Trejo y Paniagua (1562 in Casas de Millán, Crown of Castile – 11 February 1630 in Málaga, Crown of Castile) was a Spanish cardinal, bishop and Rector of the University of Salamanca. He was also known as Gabriel Tressius Panicqua.

== Biography ==
Born in Casas de Millán (Municipality of Plasencia), Trejo moved to Salamanca to study at the Colegio de Santiago and took his doctorate in both civil law and canon law before beginning a long career in various positions within the royal administration.

Trejo was Rector of the University of Salamanca and was later appointed oidor of the Royal Chancellery of Valladolid. At court he occupied the roles of legal counsel of the Council of Military Orders and of Inquisitor and Major Chaplain of the Convent of Las Descalzas Reales in Valladolid.

In 1610 he joined the Council of the Inquisition.

At the insistence of Philip III of Spain, on 16 December 1615 Pope Paul V made Trejo a cardinal, a sitting member of the Sacred Congregation of the Index, of the Council and of the Inquisition. He took part in the 1623 conclave that elected Pope Urban VIII.

In 1617 Trejo was appointed Bishop of Málaga, but did not occupy his seat, only doing so (after serious clashes with the Conde-Duque de Olivares) in 1629, being ordered to go there. He arrived in Málaga on 16 January 1630, dying on 11 February the same year shortly after arrival. A street in Málaga is named after him, in the Las Flores district.

Catholic Church titles
Preceded by Francisco Hurtado de Mendoza y Ribera	Bishop of Málaga; 1627–1630	Succeeded by Antonio Henriquez Porres
