= Villagarcía de Campos =

Coordinates: 41°47′N 5°12′W

Villagarcía de Campos, Spain
- Coat of arms
- Interactive map of Villagarcía de Campos, Spain
- Country: Spain
- Autonomous community: Castile and León
- Province: Valladolid
- Municipality: Villagarcía de Campos

Area
  - Total: 37 km^{2} (14 sq mi)

Population (2025-01-01)
  - Total: 297
  - Density: 8.0/km^{2} (21/sq mi)
- Time zone: UTC+1 (CET)
  - Summer (DST): UTC+2 (CEST)

Villagarcía de Campos is a municipality located in the province of Valladolid, Castile and León, Spain. According to the 2004 census (INE), the municipality has a population of 418 inhabitants.

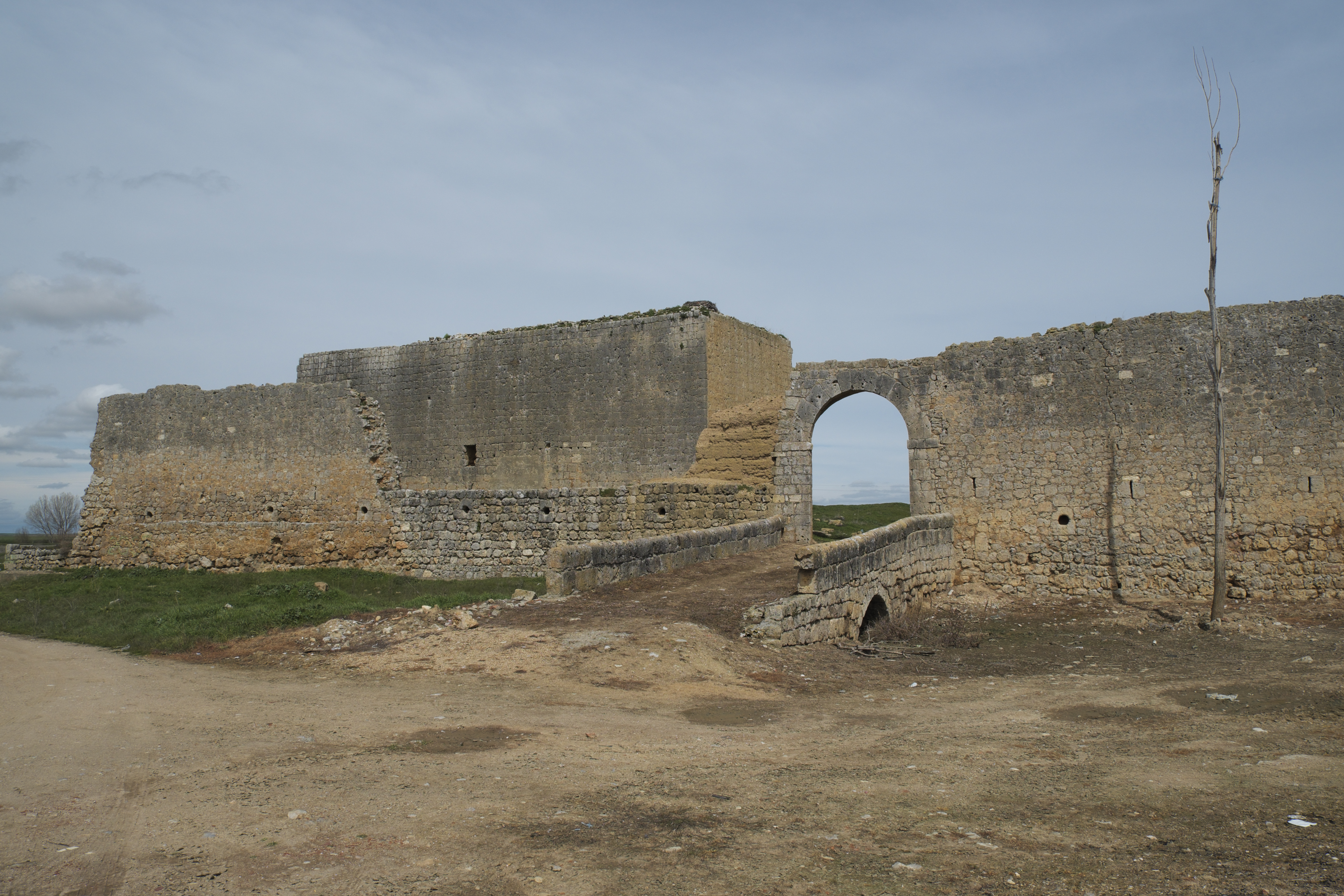
Castle ruins in Villagarcía de Campos
