= Fernando de Valdés y Llanos =

Spanish archbishop (1575-1639)

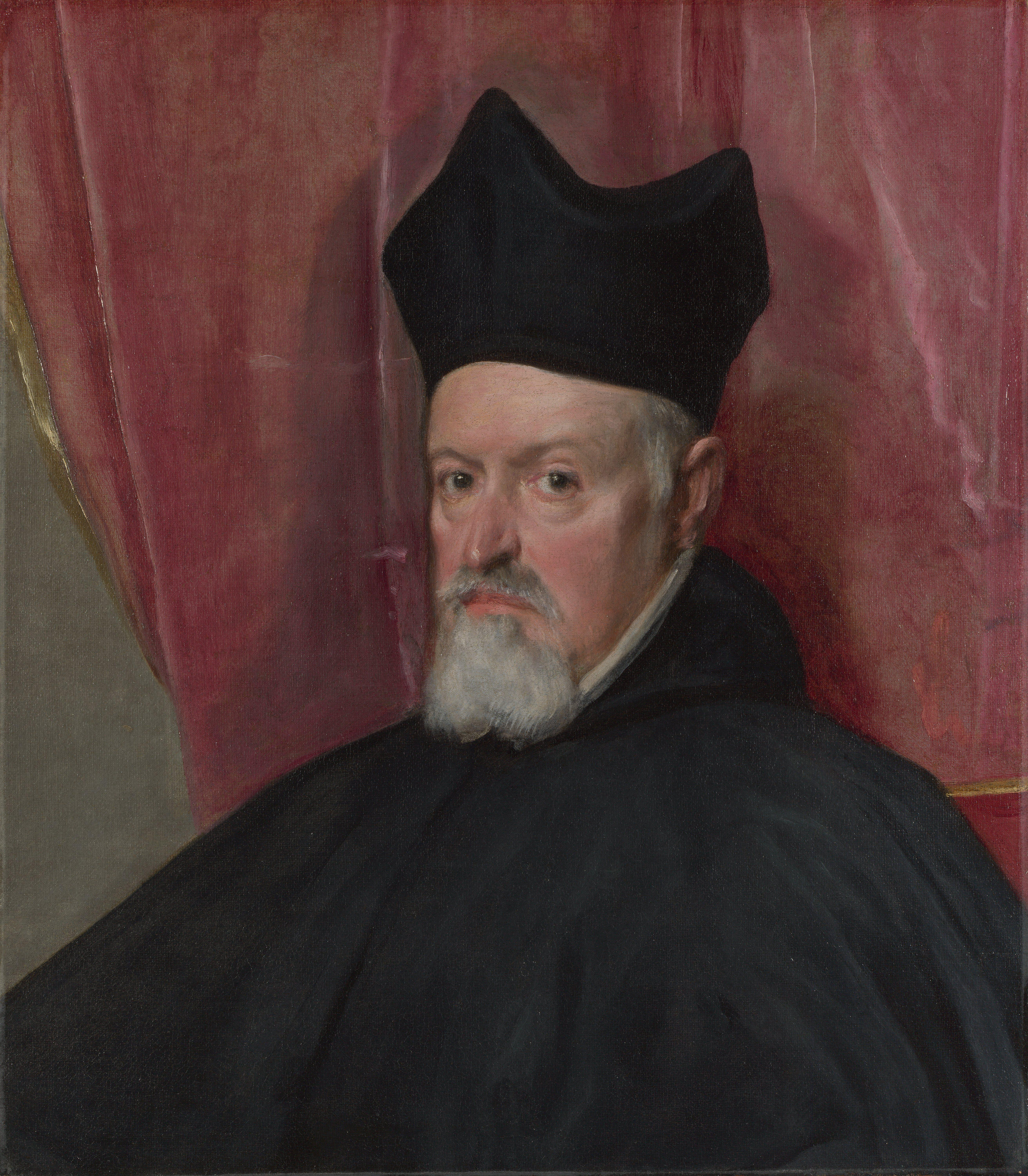
Fernando de Valdés y Llanos by Diego Velázquez

Fernando de Valdés y Llanos (28 July 1575 – 1639) was the Archbishop of Granada from 1633 to 1639.

== Biography ==
Fernando de Valdés y Llanos was born in Cangas de Tineo on July 28, 1575. He was a member of the family of the Count of Toreno.

Valdés was appointed Bishop of Teruel on 9 July 1625, and consecrated as a bishop by Diego Guzmán de Haros, Archbishop of Seville, on November 16, 1625. He was Bishop Elect of León in 1632, before being appointed Archbishop of Granada on 18 July 1633 after the death of Miguel Santos de San Pedro. He also succeeded Santos de San Pedro as president of the Council of Castile.

He died in 1639.
