= Juan Uriarte =

Spanish Roman Catholic prelate (1933–2024)

His Excellency Juan Uriarte
- Bishop Emeritus of San Sebastián
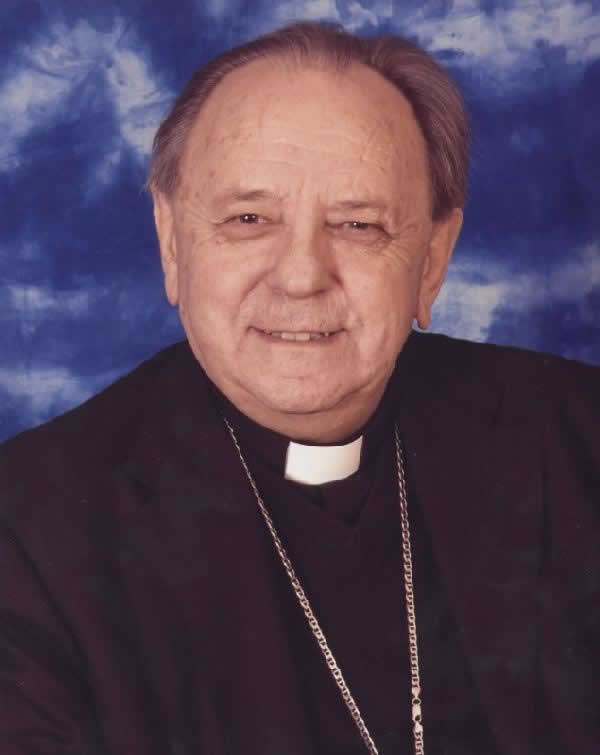
- Diocese: San Sebastián
- Appointed: 13 January 2000
- Term ended: 21 November 2009
- Predecessor: José María Setién
- Successor: José Ignacio Munilla Aguirre
- Previous posts: Auxiliary Bishop of Bilbao and Titular Bishop of Marazanae (1976–1991); Bishop of Zamora (1991–2000)

Orders
- Ordination: 28 July 1957
- Consecration: 11 October 1976 by Antonio Añoveros Ataún

Personal details
- Born: Juan María Uriarte Goiricelaya; 7 June 1933 Fruiz, Spain
- Died: 17 February 2024 (aged 90) Bilbao, Spain

Juan María Uriarte Goiricelaya (7 June 1933 – 17 February 2024) was a Spanish Roman Catholic prelate. He was bishop of Zamora from 1991 to 2000 and San Sebastián from 2000 to 2009.

During the Basque conflict, in the 1990s he was a recognized voice that advocated for peace and dialogue in the Basque Country, despite being accused of being equidistant, and was mediator between the terrorist group Euskadi Ta Askatasuna and the Spanish government during the truce between 1998 and 1999.

== Early life and studies ==
Uriarte was born in Fruiz, Basque Country, Spain, on 7 June 1933. He was ordained priest on 28 July 1957 in Bilbao. Uriarte graduated in Theology from the Comillas Pontifical University in 1963 and in Psychology from the Catholic University of Leuven in 1974.

He was a trainer at the Minor Seminary of Bilbao between 1957 and 1960, and between 1963 and 1970, Uriarte was spiritual director of the Major Seminary of Bilbao, and from 1974 to 1977 he was its rector. He also taught Psychology at the Pontifical University of Salamanca and the University of Deusto.

== Ecclesiastical career ==
Uriarte was ordained auxiliary bishop of Bilbao and titular bishop of Marazanae by Pope Paul VI on 17 September 1976 and was consecrated on 11 October. On 17 October 1991, Pope John Paul II appointed him bishop of Zamora. On numerous occasions since 1980, Uriarte publicly condemned ETA's terrorism, appealing to the mobilization of political parties and public institutions.

Between 1978 and 2002, Uriarte held several organizational positions in the Spanish Episcopal Conference.

=== Mediator for peace in the Basque Country ===
Months before becoming Bishop of Zamora, Uriarte, in January 1991, together with the bishop of Bilbao Luís María de Larrea, issued the pastoral letter "Brothers and friends of the prisoners", in which both denounced the "illegal" conditions in which the imprisoned members of the terrorist group Euskadi Ta Askatasuna (ETA) were being held, describing them as "political prisoners", stating that "neither goodwill nor pure generosity are enough. Prisoners need help, but not just any kind of help. Whoever engages in this pastoral activity must be equipped with certain aptitudes and acquire a basic and specific preparation". That letter, which made the Basque church uncomfortable, was what led to Uriarte's transfer to Zamora. His recognized work for peace often caused him to be accused of being equidistant. There, already as bishop, he met the minister of the Interior Jaime Mayor Oreja on Maundy Thursday 1996 at the ecclesiastical see in a meeting arranged by the mayor of the city Antonio Vázquez Jiménez. At that meeting, Mayor Oreja and Uriarte reflected on ETA terrorism.

Years later, the government of José María Aznar appointed him mediator with ETA during the truce between 16 September 1998 and November 1999. In November 1998, Uriarte met with Jokin Etxebarria, a trusted confidant of ETA leader Mikel Antza and, weeks later, conveyed to the gang that the Spanish government was willing to meet with them in Switzerland, a meeting that Uriarte helped to prepare. After the meeting, the French police arrested Etxbarria and ETA rejected Uriarte's mediation, considering that he was being followed by the police. When ETA announced the end of the ceasefire in November 1999, Uriarte was in charge of the response to the communiqué with which ETA ended the truce in 1999. Then, Uriarte criticized the "maximalism and impatience" of the ETA members and the "inflexibility" of the Spanish government.

Uriarte was appointed bishop of San Sebastián on 13 January 2000, and was consecrated on 27 February, succeeding José María Setién. Together with the bishops of Pamplona, Bilbao and Vitoria, he convened the "Prayer for Peace Meeting" that took place in Armentia in January 2001 and, in 2002, Uriarte was one of the signatories of the pastoral letter "Prepare peace", in which Basque ecclesiastics showed their concern about the illegalization of Batasuna after the approval of the Law of Parties. During those years he also promoted contacts between the Socialist Party of the Basque Country–Basque Country Left and Batasuna to work on a permanent ceasefire. In 2007 he interceded with the Government of José Luis Rodríguez Zapatero to mitigate the prison regime of ETA member Iñaki de Juana Chaos.

When ETA announced the ceasefire in March 2006, Uriarte offered the Church's willingness to contribute to the pacification process and called to impose the "hope for peace" over "fatalism" after the 2006 Madrid–Barajas Airport bombing that put end to the truce.

In November 2009, Pope Benedict XVI accepted his resignation, for reasons of age, and was succeeded by José Ignacio Munilla.

In 2013 Uriarte demanded that ETA "disarm and dissolve", and that the Spanish Government "sweeten the prison policy to prevent the process from rotting". In 2019, Uriarte stated that "the Basque Church cooperated in the extinction of ETA". In an interview in March 2022, Uriarte stated that the Basque conflict will be closed "when generations have passed" and that "the weapons have fallen silent, but reconciliation is more than the peace of arms: it includes memory, truth, justice, dialogue and request for forgiveness".

== Death ==
Uriarte died on 17 February 2024, at the age of 90, after being admitted to the Basurto hospital for several days after suffering a stroke at home. The funeral was held on 19 February in the Basilica of Begoña, Bilbao, and on 20 February in the San Sebastián Cathedral. Uriarte was later buried in his family pantheon in the cemetery of his hometown.

== Awards ==
- "Sabino Arana prize" (Basque Nationalist Party, 2013)

== Works ==
- "Presbyteral ministry and spirituality" (2000)
- "Being a priest in today's culture" (2000)
- "A priestly spirituality for our time" (2011)
- "The reconciliation" (2013)
- "Followers and Servers of the Word of God" (2014)
- "Celibacy" (2014)

Catholic Church titles
Preceded by José María Setién	Bishop of San Sebastián; 2000–2009	Succeeded by José Ignacio Munilla Aguirre
Preceded by Eduardo Poveda Rodriguez	Bishop of Zamora; 1991–2000	Succeeded by Casimiro López Llorente
Preceded by Isidor Markus Emanuel	Titular Bishop of Marazanae; 1976–1991	Succeeded by Henry J. Mansell
Preceded by —	Auxiliary Bishop of Bilbao; 1976–1991	Succeeded by —
