= Diocese of Sigüenza-Guadalajara =

Catholic diocese in Spain

Diocese of Sigüenza-Guadalajara Dioecesis Seguntinus-Guadalaiarensis Diócesis de Sigüenza-Guadalajara

Catholic
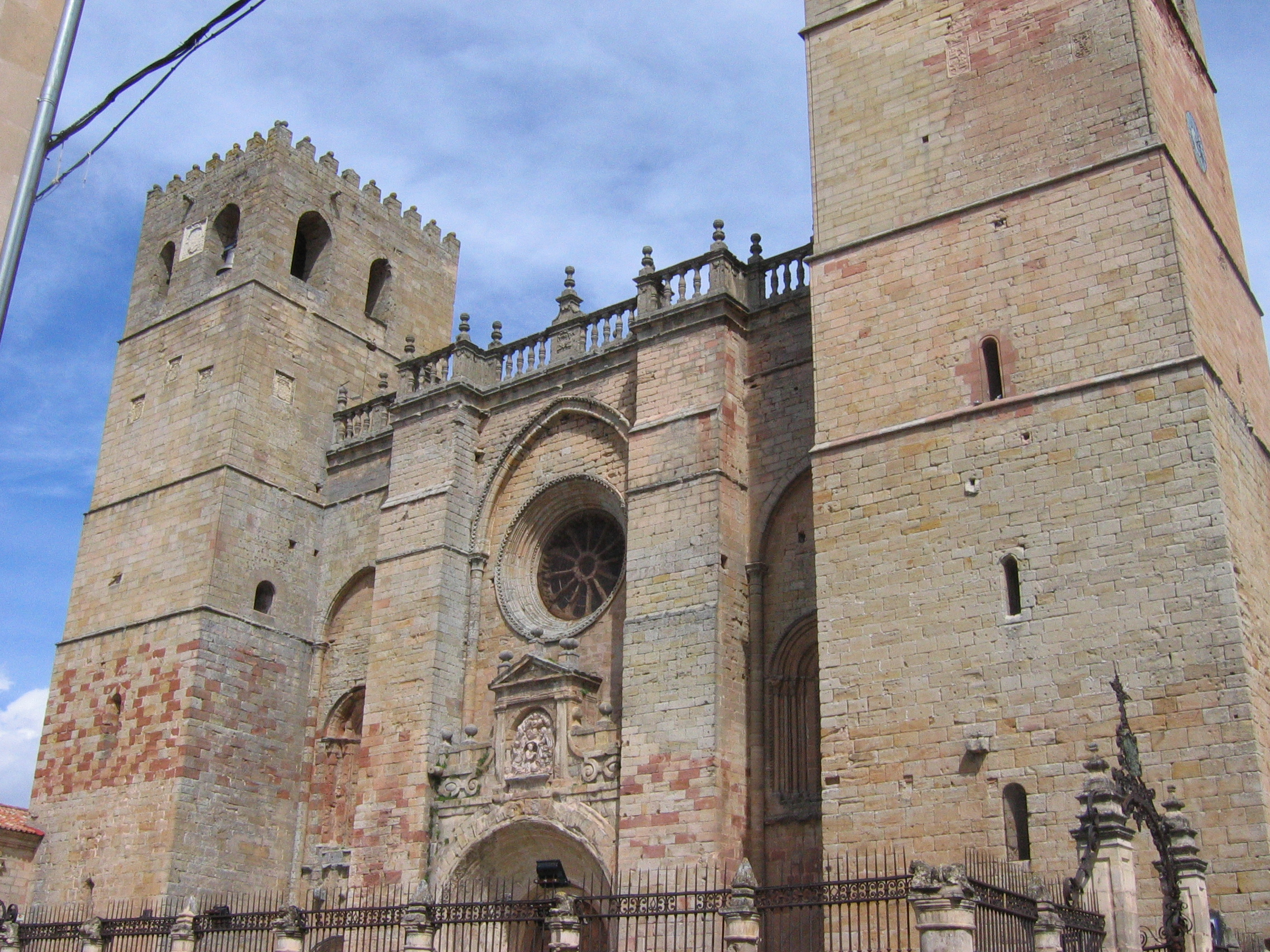
- Sigüenza Cathedral

Location
- Country: Spain
- Metropolitan: Toledo
- Headquarters: Sigüenza, Castilla–La Mancha, Spain

Statistics
- Area: 12,190 km^{2} (4,710 sq mi)
- Population: Total; Catholics: (as of 2022); 265,588; 239,427 (90.1%)
- Parishes: 469

Information
- Denomination: Catholic Church
- Sui iuris church: Latin Church
- Rite: Roman Rite
- Established: 589 (As Diocese of Sigüenza); 9 March 1959 (As Diocese of Sigüenza-Guadalajara)
- Cathedral: Cathedral Basilica of the Assumption of Our Lady in Sigüenza
- Co-cathedral: Co-Cathedral of St Mary in Guadalajara
- Patron saint: Assumption of Mary
- Secular priests: 199 (178 Diocesan, 21 Religious Orders)

Current leadership
- Pope: Leo XIV
- Bishop: Julián Ruiz Martorell
- Metropolitan Archbishop: Francisco Cerro Chaves
- Bishops emeritus: José Sánchez González; Atilano Rodríguez Martínez

Map

Website
- website of the diocese

The Diocese of Sigüenza-Guadalajara (Latin: Dioecesis Seguntinus-Guadalaiarensis) is a Latin Church diocese of the Catholic Church located in the cities of Sigüenza and Guadalajara, Spain in the ecclesiastical province of Toledo in Spain. It is in the located in the secular Spanish province of Guadalajara in Castile, central Spain. It is bounded on the north by Soria, on the east by Zaragoza and Teruel, on the south by Cuenca and on the west by Guadalajara and Segovia.

== History ==
The diocese was established in 589 AD: the fictitious chronicles pretended that St. Sacerdos of Limoges in France had been its bishop; Protogenes was present as Bishop of Sigüenza at the Third Council of Toledo and again the same Protogenes at Gundemar's council in 610; Ilsidclus assisted at the fourth, fifth and sixth councils; Wideric, at the seventh to the tenth; Egica, at the eleventh; Ela, at the twelfth, thirteenth and fourteenth; Gunderic, at the fifteenth and sixteenth. The succession of bishops continued under the Arab domination: Eulogius of Córdoba, in 851, was succeeded by Sisemund. But later on Sigüenza was so completely depopulated that it does not appear among the cities conquered by Alfonso VI of Castile (1065–1109) when he subdued all this region. The first bishop of Sigüenza, after it had been repeopled, was Bernardo, a native of Agen in France, who had been "capisol" (caput schola, Latin for school head(master)) of Toledo; he rebuilt the church and consecrated it on the Feast of St. Stephen, 1123, and placed in it a chapter of canons regular; he died Bishop-elect of Santiago. On 14 March 1140, Alfonso VII granted the bishop the feudal lordship of Sigüenza, which his successors retained until the fourteenth century, making the diocese a minor prince-bishopric.

After the long episcopate of Bernardo, Pedro succeeded, and was succeeded by Cerebruno, who began the building of the new cathedral. Jocelin, an Englishman, was present with the king at the conquest of Cuenca; he was succeeded by Arderico, who was transferred to Palencia; Martín de Hinojosa, the Abbot of Huerta, abdicated the see in 1192, and was succeeded by Rodrigo.

In 1465 Diego López of Madrid, having usurped the mitre, fortified himself there. Pedro Gonzalez de Mendoza, the Crown Cardinal of Spain, held this diocese together with the archbishopric of Toledo, and enriched his relations by providing establishments for them at Sigüenza. His successor, Cardinal Bernardino de Carvajal, was dispossessed as a schismatic by pope Julius II for his share in the Conciliabulum of Pisa. Bishop of Sigüenza Fadrique de Portugal y Noroña became in the first third of the 16th Century, Archbishop of Zaragoza and Viceroy of Catalonia. Bishops Garcia de Loaisa, Fernando de Valdés y Salas, Pedro Paeheco and others held this wealthy see. The castle-palace, modified in various ways, suffered much from the storms of civil war, and was restored by Joaquin Fernandez Cortina, who was bishop from 1848, and the restoration was continued by Bishop Gomez Salazar (1876–79).

In 1959 it was established as Diocese of Sigüenza-Guadalajara.

== Ordinaries ==
- Rodrigo (1192–1221 Died)
- Juan (3 Jun 1300 – )
- Arnaldo (17 Nov 1326 – 1328 Died)
- Blasco Dávila (1340–1341 Died)
- Lope Rodrigo de Villalobos (29 Oct 1382 – 21 Jun 1386 Died)
- Juan de Serrano (22 Dec 1389 – 24 Feb 1402 Died)
- Juan Gonzalez Fernandez de Illescas (30 Jul 1403 – 15 Nov 1415 Died)
- Pedro da Fonseca (6 Jun 1419 – 22 Aug 1422 Died)
- Alfonso Carrillo de Albornoz (17 Sep 1422 – 14 Mar 1434 Died)
- Fernando Lujan (bishop) (17 Mar 1449 – 1465 Died)
- Juan de Mella (20 May 1465 – 12 Oct 1467 Died)
- Pedro González de Mendoza (30 Oct 1467 – 11 Jan 1495 Died)
- Bernardino López de Carvajal y Sande (2 Feb 1495 – 24 Oct 1511 Resigned)
- Fadrique de Portugal Noreña, O.S.B. (20 Jun 1519 – 23 Feb 1532 Appointed, Archbishop of Zaragoza)
- García de Loaysa y Mendoza, O.P. (23 Feb 1532 – 21 May 1539 Appointed, Archbishop of Sevilla)
- Fernando de Valdés y Salas (29 Oct 1539 – 27 Aug 1546 Appointed, Archbishop of Sevilla)
- Fernando Niño de Guevara (patriarch) (8 Oct 1546 – 16 Sep 1552)
- Pedro Pacheco de Villena (Ladrón de Guevara) (30 Apr 1554 – 5 Mar 1560 Died)
- Francisco Manrique de Lara (26 Jun–11 Nov, 1560 Died)
- Pedro de la Gasca (2 Jun 1561 – 20 Nov 1567 Died)
- Diego Espinosa Arevalo (5 Jul 1568 – 5 Sep 1572 Died)
- Juan Manuel de la Cerda (4 Jun 1574 – 30 Jan 1579 Resigned)
- Lorenzo Figueroa Córdoba, O.P. (26 Jun 1579 – 20 Jan 1605 Died)
- Mateo Burgos Moraleja, O.F.M. (16 Jan 1606 – 24 Jan 1611 Died)
- Antonio Benegas Figueroa (10 Oct 1610 – 6 Oct 1614 Died)
- Sancho Dávila Toledo (20 Jul 1615 – 11 Jul 1622 Appointed, Bishop of Plasencia)
- Francisco López de Mendoza (8 Aug 1622 – 1 Mar 1623 Died)
- Pedro González de Mendoza, O.F.M. (2 Oct 1623 – 23 Jul 1639 Died)
- Fernando Andrade Sotomayor (10 Sep 1640 – 20 Mar 1645 Appointed, Archbishop of Santiago de Compostela)
- Pedro Tapia, O.P. (24 Apr 1645 – 23 Aug 1649 Appointed, Bishop of Córdoba)
- Bartolomé Santos de Risoba (9 Dec 1649 – 8 Feb 1657 Died)
- Antonio Sarmiento de Luna y Enríquez (9 Jul 1657 – 28 Jul 1661 Died)
- Andrés Bravo de Salamanca (13 Mar 1662 – 28 Aug 1668 Died)
- Frutos Bernardo Patón de Ayala (4 Feb 1669 – 28 Nov 1671 Died)
- Pedro de Godoy, O.P. (16 May 1672 – 25 Jan 1677 Died)
- Baltasar Tomás Carbonell y Sánchez, O.P. (12 Jul 1677 – 5 Apr 1692 Died)
- Juan Grande Santos de San Pedro (15 Oct 1692 – 14 Sep 1697 Died)
- Francisco Alvarez de Quiñones (15 Sep 1698 – 22 Sep 1710 Died)
- Francisco Rodríguez Mendarozqueta y Zárate (16 Apr 1714 – 26 Feb 1722 Died)
- Juan Herrera (7 Oct 1722 – 8 Jun 1726 Died)
- José García Fernández, O.F.M. (9 Dec 1726 – 9 Oct 1749 Died)
- Francisco Díaz Santos y Bullón (25 May 1750 – 17 Aug 1761 Appointed, Archbishop of Burgos)
- José Patricio de la Cuesta Velarde (17 Aug 1761 – 7 Jun 1768 Died)
- Francisco Javier Delgado y Venegas (19 Dec 1768 – 20 May 1776 Appointed, Archbishop of Sevilla)
- Juan Díaz de La Guerra (23 Jun 1777 – 29 Sep 1800 Died)
- Pedro Inocencio Bejarano (23 Feb 1801 – 13 Dec 1818 Died)
- Manuel Fraile García (29 Mar 1819 – 1 Jan 1837 Died)
- Joaquín Fernández Cortina (4 Oct 1847 – 31 Mar 1854 Died)
- Francisco de Paula Benavides y Navarrete, O.S. (21 Dec 1857 – 21 Jun 1875 Resigned)
- Manuel Gómez-Salazar y Lucio-Villegas (17 Sep 1875 – 31 Dec 1878 Confirmed, Bishop of Málaga)
- Antonio Ochoa y Arenas (28 Feb 1879 – 18 Feb 1896 Died)
- José María Caparrós y López (25 Jun 1896 – 27 Jan 1897 Died)
- Toribio Minguella y Arnedo, O.A.R. (24 Mar 1898 – 22 Aug 1916 Retired)
- Eustaquio Nieto y Martín (22 Aug 1916 – 27 Jul 1936 Died)
- Luis Alonso Muñoyerro (29 Mar 1944 – 12 Dec 1950 Appointed, Archbishop of Spain, Military)
- Pablo Gúrpide Beope (3 Jun 1951 – 19 Dec 1955 Appointed, Bishop of Bilbao)
- Lorenzo Bereciartúa y Balerdi (18 Dec 1955 – 6 Aug 1963 Appointed, Bishop of San Sebastián)
- Laureano Castán Lacoma (7 Feb 1964 – 25 Jul 1980 Resigned)
- Jesús Pla Gandía (16 Apr 1981 – 11 Sep 1991 Retired)
- José Sánchez González (11 Sep 1991 – 2 Feb 2011 Retired)
- Atilano Rodríguez Martínez (2 Feb 2011 – 31 Oct 2023 Retired)
- Julián Ruiz Martorell (31 Oct 2023 – Present)

== Auxiliary bishops ==
- Cristóbal Barrionuevo (1530–1552)
- Gaspar Flores (1533–1537)
- Daniel Vocatius, O.F.M. (1557–1575)
- Alonso Cristóbal Arguellada (1558–1572)
- Daniel Vocacio, O.F.M. (1563-?)
- Francisco Mejía de Molina, O.P. (1567–1573)
- Tadeo O'Farrell (1589–1599, Resigned)
- Antonio Viedma Chaves, O.P. (1623-1630 Appointed, Coadjutor Bishop of Almeria)
- Antonio del Buffalo, O.F.M. (1666–1668)
- Agustín de Serralde, O.F.M. (1676–1679)
- Andrés Cano y Junquera (1748–1770)
- Blas Joaquín Álvarez de Palma (1798–1801)

== Sources ==
- Diocese website
