= Lorenzo Bereciartúa y Balerdi =

Spanish bishop

- Bishop of San Sebastián
- Native name: Lorenzo Bereziartua Balerdi
- Church: Catholic Church
- Diocese: Diocese of San Sebastián
- In office: 6 August 1963 – 23 October 1968
- Predecessor: Jaume Font i Andreu
- Successor: Jacinto Argaya Goicoechea
- Previous posts: Bishop of Sigüenza-Guadalajara (1959-1963); Bishop of Sigüenza (1955-1959); Titular Bishop of Andeda (1946-1955); Auxiliary Bishop of Zaragoza (1946-1955)

Orders
- Ordination: 19 December 1919
- Consecration: 11 August 1946 by Rigoberto Doménech Valls

Personal details
- Born: 28 February 1895 Bidania, Basque Provinces, Kingdom of Spain
- Died: 23 October 1968 (aged 73) Pamplona, Navarre, Spanish State

Lorenzo Bereciartúa y Balerdi (28 February 1895 – 23 October 1968) was a Spanish bishop.

Balerdi was born in Bidegoyan, Guipúzcoa. He was consecrated Auxiliary Bishop of Zaragoza on 11 August 1946. Appointed Bishop of Sigüenza-Guadalajara in July 1955. He was appointed Bishop of San Sebastián on 30 August 1963. He died in Pamplona, aged 73.
