= Diego López de la Vega =

Roman Catholic priest (1591–1659)

Most Reverend Diego López de la Vega
- Bishop of Coria
- Church: Catholic Church
- Diocese: Diocese of Coria
- In office: 1658–1659
- Predecessor: Antonio Sarmiento de Luna y Enríquez
- Successor: Francisco de Gamboa
- Previous post: Bishop of Badajoz (1649–1658)

Orders
- Consecration: 6 March 1650 by Juan de Palafox y Mendoza

Personal details
- Born: 1591 Tortuera, Spain
- Died: 5 June 1659 (age 68) Coria, Cáceres, Spain

Diego López de la Vega (1591 – 5 June 1659) was a Roman Catholic prelate who served as Bishop of Coria (1658–1659) and Bishop of Badajoz (1649–1658).

== Biography ==
Diego López de la Vega was born in Tortuera, Spain in 1591. On 29 April 1649, he was selected by the King of Spain and confirmed by Pope Innocent X on 23 August 1649 as Bishop of Badajoz. On 6 March 1650, he was consecrated bishop by Juan de Palafox y Mendoza, Bishop of Tlaxcala. On 28 January 1658, he was appointed during the papacy of Pope Alexander VII as Bishop of Coria. He served as Bishop of Coria until his death on 5 June 1659.

== External links and additional sources ==
- Cheney, David M. "Archdiocese of Mérida–Badajoz". Catholic-Hierarchy.org. (for Chronology of Bishops)^{self-published}
- Chow, Gabriel. "Metropolitan Archdiocese of Mérida–Badajoz". GCatholic.org. (for Chronology of Bishops)^{self-published}
- Cheney, David M. "Diocese of Coria-Cáceres". Catholic-Hierarchy.org. (for Chronology of Bishops) ^{[self-published]}
- Chow, Gabriel. "Diocese of Coria-Caceres (Spain)". GCatholic.org. (for Chronology of Bishops) ^{[self-published]}

Catholic Church titles
Preceded by Angel Manrique	Bishop of Badajoz; 1649–1658	Succeeded by Diego del Castillo y Arteaga
Preceded by Antonio Sarmiento de Luna y Enríquez	Bishop of Coria; 1658–1659	Succeeded by Francisco de Gamboa
