= Juan Arroyo =

Juan Arroyo may refer to:

- Juan Arroyo (bishop) (died 1656), Spanish Roman Catholic bishop
- Juan Arroyo (composer) (active 2021), composer of classical music
- Juan Arroyo (cyclist) (born 1955), Venezuelan cyclist
