= Frutos Bernardo Patón de Ayala =

Spanish Roman Catholic prelate

Most Reverend Frutos Bernardo Patón de Ayala
- Bishop of Sigüenza
- Church: Catholic Church
- Diocese: Diocese of Sigüenza
- In office: 1669–1671
- Predecessor: Andrés Bravo de Salamanca
- Successor: Pedro de Godoy
- Previous post: Bishop of Coria (1664–1669)

Orders
- Ordination: October 1631

Personal details
- Born: 1600 El Espinar, Spain
- Died: 28 November 1671 (age 71) Sigüenza, Spain

Frutos Bernardo Patón de Ayala (1600 – 28 November 1671) was a Roman Catholic prelate who served as Bishop of Sigüenza (1669–1671) and Bishop of Coria (1664–1669).

== Biography ==
Frutos Bernardo Patón de Ayala was born in El Espinar, Spain in 1600 and ordained a priest in October 1631. On 23 June 1664, he was appointed during the papacy of Pope Alexander VII as Bishop of Coria. On 4 February 1669, he was appointed during the papacy of Pope Clement IX as Bishop of Sigüenza. He served as Bishop of Sigüenza until his death on 28 November 1671.

== External links and additional sources ==
- Cheney, David M. "Diocese of Coria-Cáceres". Catholic-Hierarchy.org. (for Chronology of Bishops) ^{[self-published]}
- Chow, Gabriel. "Diocese of Coria-Caceres (Spain)". GCatholic.org. (for Chronology of Bishops) ^{[self-published]}
- Cheney, David M. "Diocese of Sigüenza-Guadalajara". Catholic-Hierarchy.org. (for Chronology of Bishops) ^{[self-published]}
- Chow, Gabriel. "Diocese of Sigüenza–Guadalajara (Spain)". GCatholic.org. (for Chronology of Bishops) ^{[self-published]}

Catholic Church titles
Preceded by Gabriel Vázquez Saavedra y Rojas	Bishop of Coria; 1664–1669	Succeeded by Antonio Fernández del Campo Angulo y Velasco
Preceded by Andrés Bravo de Salamanca	Bishop of Sigüenza; 1669–1671	Succeeded by Pedro de Godoy
