= Vidania =

Vidania may refer to:

- Vidania, a village, part of the municipality of Bidania-Goiatz (Spanish: Bidegoyan) in the province of Gipuzkoa, in the Basque Country of Spain
- Vidania, a 2006 album by La Buena Vida, an indie pop group from Spain
