= Tomás Carbonell (bishop) =

Spanish friar and bishop

The Most Reverend Tomás Carbonell O.P.
- Bishop of Sigüenza
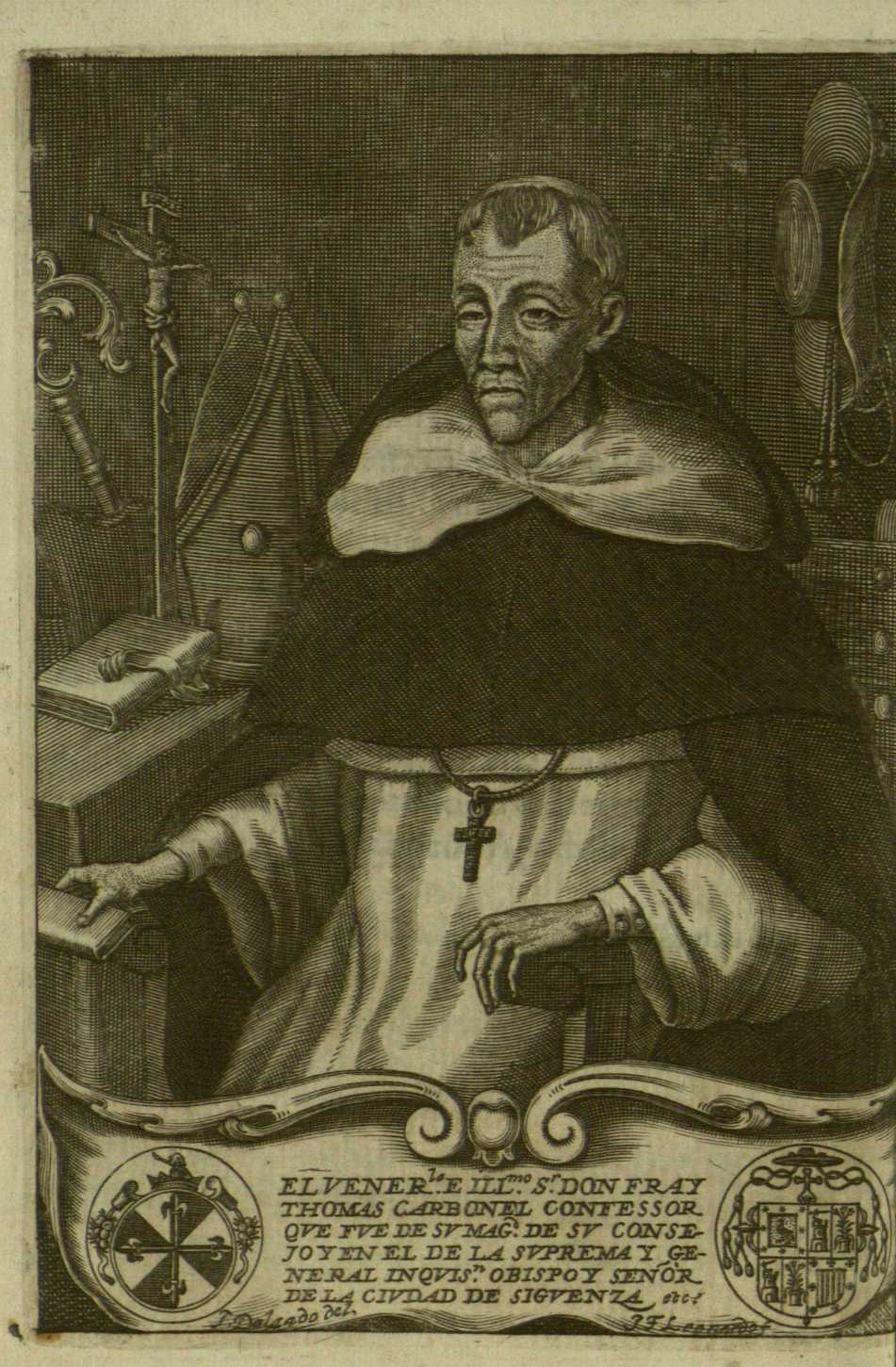
- Church: Roman Catholic
- In office: 1677–1692
- Predecessor: Pedro de Godoy
- Successor: Juan Grande Santos de San Pedro

Orders
- Consecration: 26 September 1677

Personal details
- Born: 6 January 1621; Madrid, Spain
- Died: 5 April 1692 (aged 71)

Baltasar Tomás Carbonell y Sánchez, O.P. (6 January 1621 – 5 April 1692) was a Spanish friar of the Dominican Order. He served as royal confessor to King Charles II of Spain twice: from 1676 to 1678 and from 1682 to 1686. He was also the Bishop of Sigüenza from 1677 until his death in 1692.

== See also ==
- Catholic Church in Spain
