= Inquisitor =

Official (usually with judicial or investigative functions) in an Inquisition

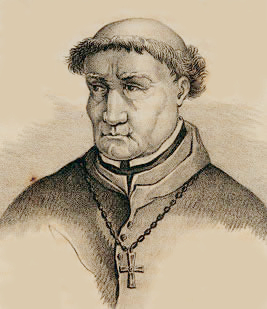
Tomás de Torquemada, Spanish Dominican friar and Grand Inquisitor of the Spanish Inquisition from 1483 to 1498

An inquisitor was an official (usually with judicial or investigative functions) in an inquisition – an organization or program intended to eliminate heresy and other things contrary to the doctrine or teachings of the Catholic faith. Literally, an inquisitor is one who "searches out" or "inquires" (from the Latin inquirere).

There exist archaic female forms of the word. "Inquisitrix" was used in the early 1800s, and its predecessor "inquisitress" was used in the early 1700s.

In some cases, inquisitors sought out the social networks that people (allegedly) used to spread heresy.

There were multiple national inquisitions with different approaches and targets.

By extension, the term "inquisitor" sometimes refers to interrogators not connected with the Catholic church — for example, to zealous NKVD functionaries in the Soviet Union.

== Controversies ==
In the Albigensian Crusade a second-hand story arose that inquisitor and general Arnaud Amalric at the storming of Béziers advocated general slaughter, saying “Kill them. For God knows who are his.” Amalric's own report to the Pope was that his troops jumped the gun and took over the town violently before he was aware.

== Prominent inquisitors ==
Some of the better-known and notable inquisitors throughout history include:

- Peter of Verona (also known as Saint Peter Martyr), whose canonization was the fastest in history
- Pedro de Arbués
- Nicolau Aymerich author of Directorium Inquisitorum
- Stephen of Bourbon
- Arnaut Catalan
- Fabio Chigi (later Pope Alexander VII)
- Diego Deza
- Bernard Gui
- Heinrich Institoris, author of Malleus Maleficarum
- Francisco Jimenez de Cisneros
- Konrad von Marburg
- Sebastien Michaelis
- Giovanni Pietro Carafa (later Pope Paul IV)
- Jacob Sprenger, purported co-author of Malleus Maleficarum
- Tomás de Torquemada
- Martín García Ceniceros
- Hentenius (1540s-1566)
- Vincenza Matilde Testaferrata, female inquisitor

== See also ==
- Grand Inquisitor
- Medieval Inquisition
- Spanish Inquisition
- Portuguese Inquisition
- Roman Inquisition
- Mexican Inquisition
- Inquisitorial system, a type of legal system
