= Arnaut Catalan =

Arnaut Catalan (fl. 1219–1253) was a troubadour active in the Languedoc, Catalonia, and Castile. He left behind five cansos, three tensos, and one religious song.

Arnaut's origins are disputed. Most Catalan scholars, such as Milà and Fontanals, believe him to be a Catalan, hence his nickname. Others, such as Chabaneau, assign him to a prominent family from Toulouse named "Catalan". If the latter is correct he is probably the same as the Dominican Inquisitor who persecuted Cathars with such force that he was almost killed by a mob in Albi in 1234. The troubadour was probably in Lombardy at the Este court in Caleone between 1221 and 1233.

Four of Arnaut's cansos are dedicated to Beatrice of Savoy, wife of Raymond Berengar IV of Provence, and one of his tensos was composed with Raymond. An Arnaldus Catalanus, probably Arnaut, confirmed a donation of Raymond's at Aix-en-Provence on 29 August 1241. In 1252 a Don Arnaldo was in Castile at the court of Alfonso X, where he composed a tenso with the king, his part being Occitan and the king's Galician-Portuguese. Arnaut composed one other tenso with a poet named Vaquier Teriaz.

== Sources ==
- Riquer, Martín de. Los trovadores: historia literaria y textos. 3 vol. Barcelona: Planeta, 1975.
