= Jacinto Argaya Goicoechea =

Spanish-Basque prelate

- Bishop of San Sebastián
- Native name: Jacinto Argaia Goikoetxea
- Church: Catholic Church
- Diocese: Diocese of San Sebastián
- In office: 18 November 1968 – 16 February 1979
- Predecessor: Lorenzo Bereciartúa y Balerdi
- Successor: José María Setién
- Previous posts: Bishop of Mondoñedo-Ferrol (1959-1968); Bishop of Mondoñedo (1957-1959); Titular Bishop of Geras (1952-1957); Auxiliary Bishop of Valencia (1952-1957)

Orders
- Ordination: 2 June 1928
- Consecration: 26 October 1952 by Marcelino Olaechea

Personal details
- Born: 28 November 1903 Bera, Navarre, Kingdom of Spain
- Died: 12 March 1993 (aged 89) Valencia, Valencian Community, Spain

Jacinto Argaya Goicoechea (28 November 1903 in Vera de Bidasoa, Navarra – 12 March 1993 in Valencia) was a Spanish-Basque prelate of the Catholic Church.

Goicoechea was born in a very traditionalist and conservative family. During the Spanish Civil War, he was a stalwart against Communism and campaigned on behalf of imprisoned priests.

He was consecrated Auxiliary Bishop of Valencia on 15 August 1952. From 1952 he held the position of Titular Bishop of Geras. He was appointed Bishop of Mondoñedo-Ferrol on 27 October 1957, where he represented his Diocese at the Second Vatican Council. Due to the doctrines expressed at the Council he began to adopt very progressive ideals. He took part in every meeting of every session of the Council.

He was appointed Bishop of San Sebastián on 18 December 1968. Here he was an outspoken critic against the summary death Sentences condemning members of ETA in the Trial of Burgos. He resigned on 17 February 1979.

He died in 1993 in Valencia and was buried at the cathedral at San Sebastián.

== Sources ==
- Catholic Hierarchy: Jacinto Argaya Goicoechea
