= Pedro Tapia =

Roman Catholic prelate (1582–1657)

The Most Reverend Pedro Tapia O.P.
- Archbishop of Seville
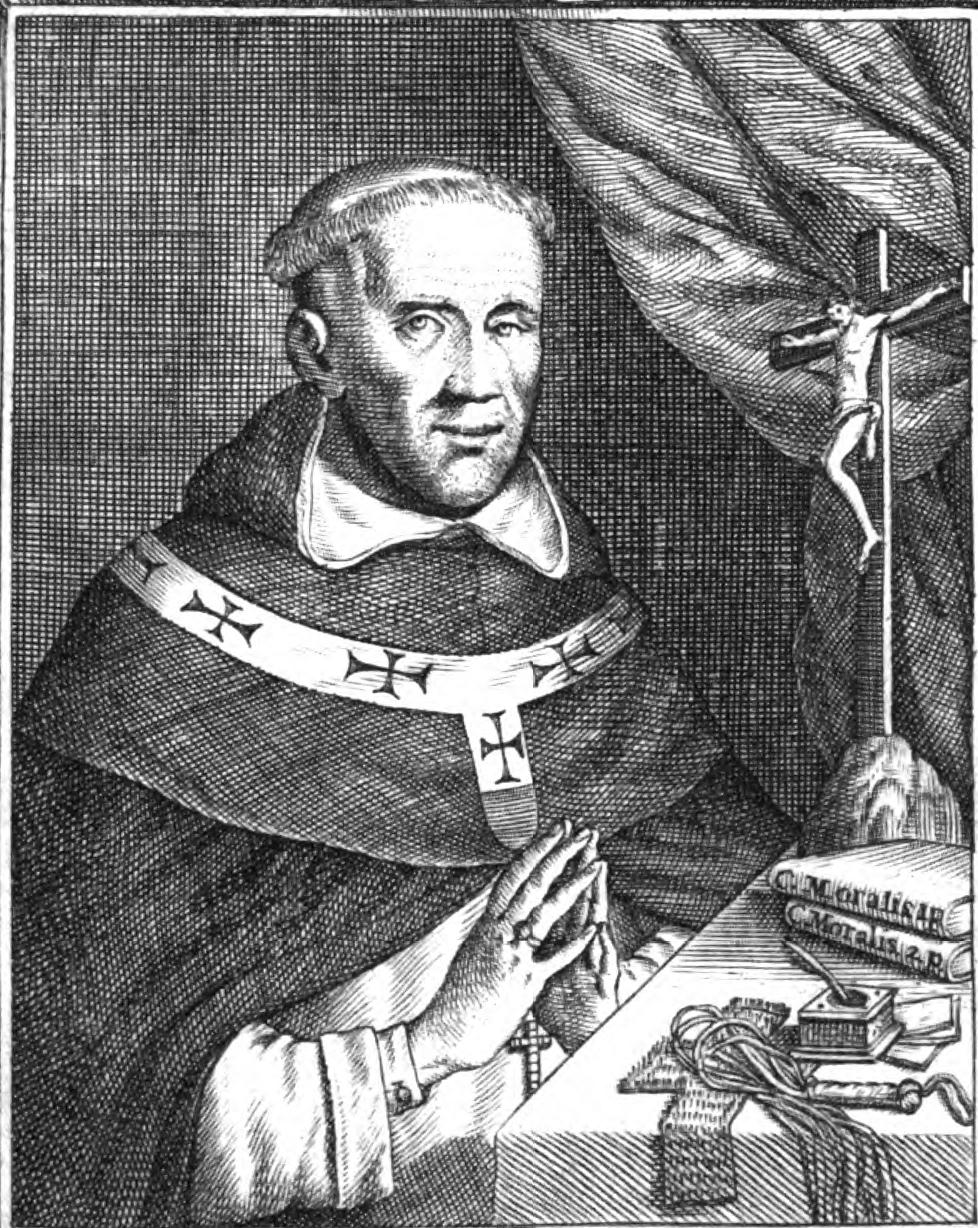
- Church: Catholic Church
- Archdiocese: Archdiocese of Seville
- In office: 1652–1657
- Predecessor: Domingo Pimentel Zúñiga
- Successor: Pedro Urbina Montoya
- Previous posts: Bishop of Segovia (1641–1644); Bishop of Sigüenza (1644–1645); Bishop of Córdoba (1649–1652)

Orders
- Consecration: 25 July 1641 by Antonio Sotomayor

Personal details
- Born: March 1582 Villorios, Spain
- Died: 25 August 1657 (age 75) Seville, Spain

Pedro Tapia, O.P. (March 1582 – 25 August 1657) was a Roman Catholic prelate who served as Archbishop of Seville (1652–1657), Bishop of Córdoba (1649–1652), Bishop of Sigüenza (1644–1645), and Bishop of Segovia (1641–1644).

== Biography ==
Pedro Tapia was born in Villorios, Spain in March 1582 and ordained a priest in the Order of Preachers. On 7 January 1641, he was appointed during the papacy of Pope Urban VIII as Bishop of Segovia. On 25 July 1641, he was consecrated bishop by Antonio Sotomayor, Titular Archbishop of Damascus, with Francisco Pérez Roya, Bishop of Perpignan-Elne, and Fernando Montero Espinosa, Bishop of Nueva Segovia, serving as co-consecrators. On 8 September 1644, he was selected by the King of Spain and confirmed by Pope Innocent X on 24 April 1645 as Bishop of Sigüenza. On 23 August 1649, he was appointed during the papacy of Pope Innocent X as Bishop of Córdoba. On 23 September 1652, he was appointed during the papacy of Pope Innocent X as Archbishop of Seville. He served as Archbishop of Seville until his death on 25 August 1657.

While bishop, he was the principal consecrator of Juan Arroyo, Auxiliary Bishop of Seville (1655).

== External links and additional sources ==
- Cheney, David M. "Diocese of Segovia". Catholic-Hierarchy.org. (for Chronology of Bishops) ^{[self-published]}
- Chow, Gabriel. "Diocese of Segovia (Spain)". GCatholic.org. (for Chronology of Bishops) ^{[self-published]}
- Cheney, David M. "Diocese of Sigüenza-Guadalajara". Catholic-Hierarchy.org. (for Chronology of Bishops) ^{[self-published]}
- Chow, Gabriel. "Diocese of Sigüenza–Guadalajara (Spain)". GCatholic.org. (for Chronology of Bishops) ^{[self-published]}
- Cheney, David M. "Diocese of Córdoba". Catholic-Hierarchy.org. (for Chronology of Bishops) ^{[self-published]}
- Chow, Gabriel. "Diocese of Córdoba". GCatholic.org. (for Chronology of Bishops) ^{[self-published]}
- Cheney, David M. "Archdiocese of Sevilla (Seville)". www.gcatholic.org. (for Chronology of Bishops) ^{[self-published]}
- Chow, Gabriel. "Metropolitan Archdiocese of Sevilla (Spain)". www.gcatholic.org. (for Chronology of Bishops) ^{[self-published]}

Catholic Church titles
Preceded by Mendo de Benavides	Bishop of Segovia; 1641–1644	Succeeded by Pedro Neila
Preceded by Fernando Andrade Sotomayor	Bishop of Sigüenza; 1644–1645	Succeeded by Bartolomé Santos de Risoba
Preceded by Domingo Pimentel Zúñiga	Bishop of Córdoba; 1649–1652	Succeeded by Juan Francisco Pacheco
Preceded by Domingo Pimentel Zúñiga	Archbishop of Seville; 1652–1657	Succeeded by Pedro Urbina Montoya
