= Gabriel Vázquez Saavedra y Rojas =

Spanish Roman Catholic prelate

Most Reverend Gabriel Vázquez Saavedra y Rojas
- Bishop of Coria
- Church: Catholic Church
- Diocese: Diocese of Coria
- In office: 1663–1664
- Predecessor: Francisco de Gamboa
- Successor: Frutos Bernardo Patón de Ayala

Personal details
- Born: 1607 Madrid, Spain
- Died: 1664 (age 57) Coria, Cáceres, Spain

Gabriel Vázquez Saavedra y Rojas (1607–1664) was a Roman Catholic prelate who served as Bishop of Coria (1663–1664).

== Biography ==
Gabriel Vázquez Saavedra y Rojas was born in Madrid, Spain in 1607. On 27 August 1663, he was appointed during the papacy of Pope Alexander VII as Bishop of Coria. He served as Bishop of Coria until his death in 1664.

== External links and additional sources ==
- Cheney, David M. "Diocese of Coria-Cáceres". Catholic-Hierarchy.org. (for Chronology of Bishops) ^{[self-published]}
- Chow, Gabriel. "Diocese of Coria-Caceres (Spain)". GCatholic.org. (for Chronology of Bishops) ^{[self-published]}

Catholic Church titles
Preceded by Francisco de Gamboa	Bishop of Coria; 1663–1664	Succeeded by Frutos Bernardo Patón de Ayala
