= Antonio Sarmiento de Luna y Enríquez =

Spanish Roman Catholic prelate

Most Reverend Antonio Sarmiento de Luna y Enríquez
- Bishop of Sigüenza
- Church: Catholic Church
- Diocese: Roman Catholic Diocese of Sigüenza
- In office: 1657–1661
- Predecessor: Bartolomé Santos de Risoba
- Successor: Andrés Bravo de Salamanca
- Previous post: Bishop of Coria (1655–1657)

Orders
- Ordination: 6 December 1654

Personal details
- Born: 1606 Madrid, Spain
- Died: 28 July 1661 (age 55) Sigüenza, Spain

Antonio Sarmiento de Luna y Enríquez (1606 – 28 July 1661) was a Roman Catholic prelate who served as Bishop of Sigüenza (1657–1661) and Bishop of Coria (1655–1657).

== Biography ==
Antonio Sarmiento de Luna y Enríquez was born in Madrid, Spain in 1606 and ordained a priest on 6 December 1654. On 14 May 1655, he was appointed during the papacy of Pope Alexander VII as Bishop of Coria. On 8 April 1657, he was selected by the King of Spain and confirmed by Pope Alexander VII on 9 July 1657 as Bishop of Sigüenza. He served as Bishop of Coria until his death on 28 July 1661.

== External links and additional sources ==
- Cheney, David M. "Diocese of Coria-Cáceres". Catholic-Hierarchy.org. (for Chronology of Bishops) ^{[self-published]}
- Chow, Gabriel. "Diocese of Coria-Caceres (Spain)". GCatholic.org. (for Chronology of Bishops) ^{[self-published]}
- Cheney, David M. "Diocese of Sigüenza-Guadalajara". Catholic-Hierarchy.org. (for Chronology of Bishops) ^{[self-published]}
- Chow, Gabriel. "Diocese of Sigüenza–Guadalajara (Spain)". GCatholic.org. (for Chronology of Bishops) ^{[self-published]}

Catholic Church titles
Preceded by Francisco de Zapata y Mendoza	Bishop of Coria; 1655–1657	Succeeded by Diego López de la Vega
Preceded by Bartolomé Santos de Risoba	Bishop of Sigüenza; 1657–1661	Succeeded by Andrés Bravo de Salamanca
