= Martín García Ceniceros =

Spanish Roman Catholic prelate

Most Reverend Diego Fernández de Villalán
- Bishop Elect of Almería
- Church: Catholic Church
- Diocese: Diocese of Almería
- In office: 1632
- Predecessor: Antonio Viedma Chaves
- Successor: Bartolomé Santos de Risoba
- Previous posts: Inquisitor of Canarias; Inquisitor of Valencia; Inquisitor of Cartagena; Inquisitor of Valladolid

Personal details
- Born: Tenillono, Spain
- Died: October 1632 Almería, Spain

Martín García Ceniceros (also Martín García Gómez de Ceniceros)(died Oct 1632) was a Roman Catholic prelate who served as Inquisitor of Canarias, Valencia, Cartagena, and Valladolid. He was appointed and briefly served as Bishop Elect of Almería (1632) but died before his consecration.

== Biography ==
Martín García Ceniceros was born in Tenillono, Spain. He was ordained a priest in the Diocese of Calahorra and obtained a license in Theology and a doctorate in Canon Law. After his schooling, he was successively appointed the Inquisitor of the Diocese of Canarias, the Archdiocese of Valencia, the Diocese of Cartagena, and then the Diocese of Valladolid. After the death of Bishop Antonio Viedma Chaves, he was selected on 1 March 1632 by the King of Spain, Felipe IV and confirmed on 2 August 1632 by Pope Urban VIII as Bishop of Almería. Although he assumed the office and duties as Bishop, he died 2 months later in October 1632 and was never consecrated.

Catholic Church titles
Preceded by Antonio Viedma Chaves	Bishop Elect of Almería; 1632	Succeeded by Bartolomé Santos de Risoba
