= Pedro Urbina Montoya =

Spanish Roman Catholic prelate

Most Reverend Pedro Urbina Montoya
- Archbishop of Seville
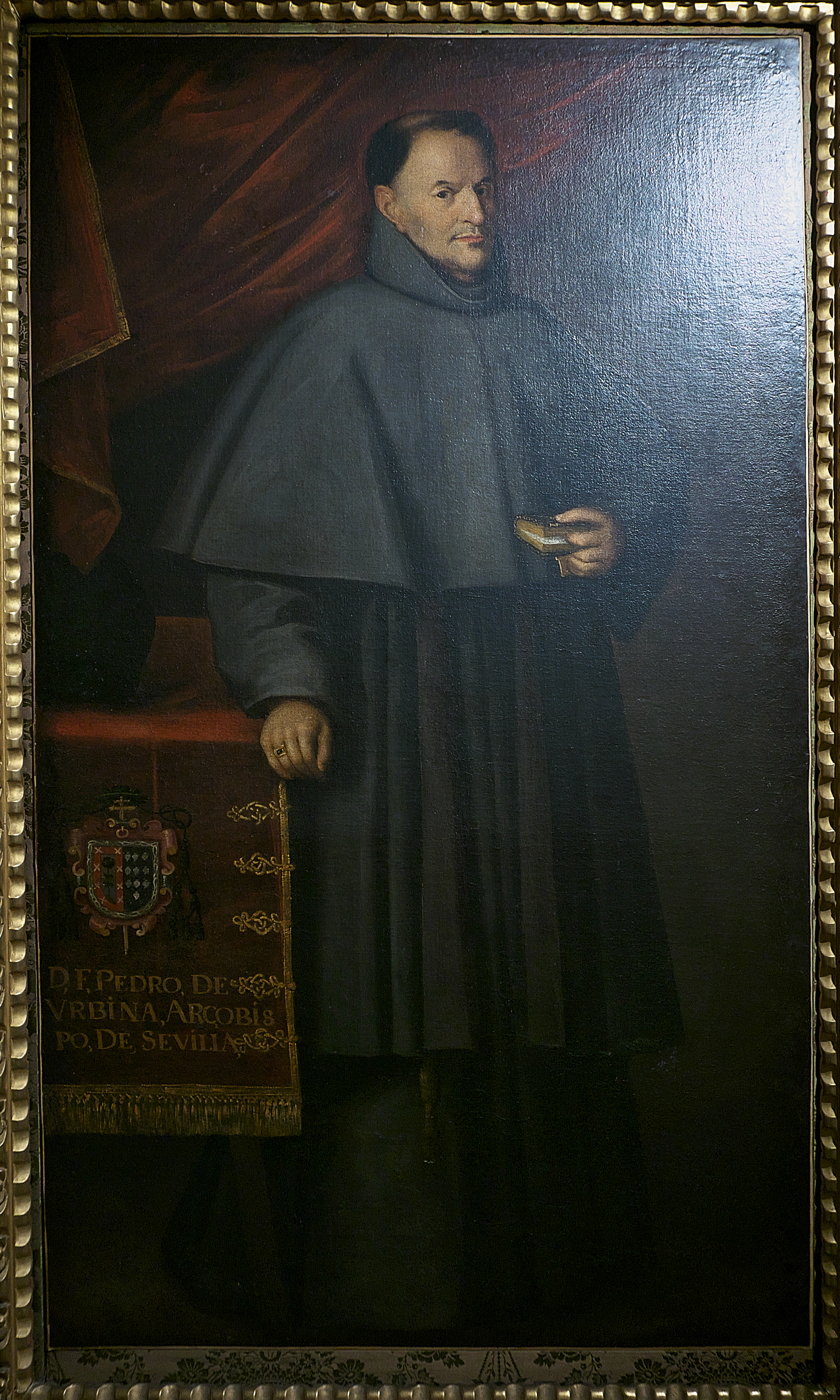
- Pedro Urbina Montoya, was the Archbishop of Seville.
- Church: Catholic Church
- Archdiocese: Archdiocese of Seville
- In office: 1658–1663
- Predecessor: Pedro Tapia
- Successor: Antonio Paiño Sevilla
- Previous posts: Bishop of Coria (1644–1648); Archbishop of Valencia (1648–1658)

Orders
- Ordination: 22 February 1609
- Consecration: 11 September 1644 by Diego Arce Reinoso

Personal details
- Born: 12 August 1585 Berantevilla, Spain
- Died: 6 February 1663 (aged 77) Seville, Italy

Pedro Urbina Montoya, O.F.M. or Pedro de Urbina y Montoya (12 August 1585 – 6 February 1663) was a Roman Catholic prelate who served as Archbishop of Seville (1658–1663), Archbishop of Valencia (1648–1658), and Bishop of Coria (1644–1648).

== Biography ==
Pedro Urbina Montoya was born in Berantevilla, Spain on 12 August 1585 and ordained a priest in the Order of Friars Minor on 22 February 1609. On 2 May 1644, he was appointed during the papacy of Pope Urban VIII as Bishop of Coria. On 11 September 1644, he was consecrated bishop by Diego Arce Reinoso, Bishop of Plasencia, with Miguel Avellán, Titular Bishop of Siriensis, and Timoteo Pérez Vargas, Titular Bishop of Lystra, serving as co-consecrators. On 30 December 1648, he was selected by the King of Spain and confirmed by Pope Innocent X on 28 June 1649 as Archbishop of Valencia. He was installed on 18 December 1649. On 1 April 1658, he was appointed during the papacy of Pope Alexander VII as Archbishop of Seville. He served as Archbishop of Seville until his death on 6 February 1663.

== Episcopal succession ==
While bishop, he was the principal consecrator of:

- Luis Crespi y Borja, Bishop of Orihuela (1652);

and the principal co-consecrator of:

- Juan Juániz de Echalar, Bishop of Mondoñedo (1645);
- Domenico Blanditi, Bishop of Umbriatico (1650);
- Tommaso Lolli, Titular Bishop of Cyrene (1650); and
- Giovanni Gerini, Bishop of Volterra (1650).

== External links and additional sources ==
- Cheney, David M. "Diocese of Coria-Cáceres". Catholic-Hierarchy.org. (for Chronology of Bishops) ^{[self-published]}
- Chow, Gabriel. "Diocese of Coria-Caceres (Spain)". GCatholic.org. (for Chronology of Bishops) ^{[self-published]}
- Cheney, David M. "Archdiocese of Valencia". Catholic-Hierarchy.org. (for Chronology of Bishops)^{self-published}
- Chow, Gabriel. "Metropolitan Archdiocese of Valencia". GCatholic.org. (for Chronology of Bishops)^{self-published}
- Cheney, David M. "Archdiocese of Sevilla {Seville}". Catholic-Hierarchy.org. (for Chronology of Bishops) ^{[self-published]}
- Chow, Gabriel. "Metropolitan Archdiocese of Sevilla (Italy)". GCatholic.org. (for Chronology of Bishops) ^{[self-published]}

Catholic Church titles
Preceded by Juan Queipo de Llano y Valdés (bishop)	Bishop of Coria; 1644–1648	Succeeded by Francisco de Zapata y Mendoza
Preceded by Isidoro Aliaga	Archbishop of Valencia; 1648–1658	Succeeded by Martín López de Ontiveros
Preceded by Pedro Tapia	Archbishop of Seville; 1658–1663	Succeeded by Antonio Paiño Sevilla
