= Bartolomé Santos de Risoba =

Spanish Roman Catholic prelate

Most Reverend Bartolomé Santos de Risoba
- Bishop of Sigüenza
- Church: Catholic Church
- In office: 1649–1657
- Predecessor: Pedro Tapia
- Successor: Antonio Sarmiento de Luna y Enríquez
- Previous posts: Bishop of Almería (1633); Bishop of León (1633–1649)

Orders
- Consecration: 29 January 1634 by Cristóbal Guzmán Santoyo

Personal details
- Born: 6 March 1582 Saldaña, Spain
- Died: 8 February 1657 (age 74) Sigüenza, Spain

Bartolomé Santos de Risoba (1582–1657) was a Roman Catholic prelate who served as Bishop of Sigüenza (1649–1657), Bishop of León (1633–1649), and Bishop of Almería (1633).

== Biography ==
Bartolomé Santos de Risoba was born in Saldaña, Spain on 6 March 1582. On 6 June 1633, he was appointed during the papacy of Pope Urban VIII as Bishop of Almeria. On 26 September 1633, he was appointed during the papacy of Pope Urban VIII as Bishop of León. On 29 January 1634, he was consecrated bishop by Cristóbal Guzmán Santoyo, Bishop of Palencia, with Miguel Avellán, Titular Bishop of Siriensis, and Cristóforo Chrisostome Carletti, Bishop of Termia, serving as co-consecrators. On 21 June 1649, he was selected by the King of Spain as Bishop of Sigüenza and confirmed by Pope Innocent X on 9 December 1649. He served as Bishop of Sigüenza until his death on 8 February 1657.

== Episcopal succession ==
While bishop, he was the principal consecrator of:

- Pedro Carrillo Acuña y Bureba, Bishop of Salamanca (1648);

and the principal co-consecrator of:

- Gonzalo Sánchez de Somoza Quiroga, Bishop of Mondoñedo (1639); and
- Juan Queipo de Llano Flores, Bishop of Pamplona (1639).

== External links and additional sources ==
- Cheney, David M. "Diocese of León". Catholic-Hierarchy.org. (for Chronology of Bishops) ^{[self-published]}
- Chow, Gabriel. "Diocese of León". GCatholic.org. (for Chronology of Bishops) ^{[self-published]}
- Cheney, David M. "Diocese of Sigüenza-Guadalajara". Catholic-Hierarchy.org. (for Chronology of Bishops) ^{[self-published]}
- Chow, Gabriel. "Diocese of Sigüenza–Guadalajara (Spain)". GCatholic.org. (for Chronology of Bishops) ^{[self-published]}

Catholic Church titles
| Preceded by Martín García Ceniceros | Bishop of Almería; 1633 | Succeeded by Antonio González Acevedo |
| Preceded by Gregorio Pedrosa Cásares | Bishop of León; 1633–1649 | Succeeded by Juan del Pozo Horta |
| Preceded by Pedro Tapia | Bishop of Sigüenza; 1649–1657 | Succeeded by Antonio Sarmiento de Luna y Enríquez |
