= Francisco de Gamboa =

Spanish Roman Catholic prelate

Most Reverend Francisco de Gamboa
- Archbishop of Zaragoza
- Church: Catholic Church
- Diocese: Archdiocese of Zaragoza
- In office: 1663–1674
- Predecessor: Juan Cebrián Pedro
- Successor: Francisco Lara (archbishop)
- Previous post: Bishop of Coria (1659–1663)

Orders
- Consecration: 1660 by Diego Arce Reinoso

Personal details
- Born: 21 March 1599 San Sebastián, Spain
- Died: 22 May 1674 (aged 75) Zaragoza, Spain

Francisco de Gamboa, O.S.A. (21 March 1599 – 22 May 1674) was a Roman Catholic prelate who served as Archbishop of Zaragoza (1663–1674) and Bishop of Coria (1659–1663).

== Biography ==
Francisco de Gamboa was born in San Sebastián, Spain on 21 March 1599 and ordained a priest in the Order of Saint Augustine. On 5 July 1659, he was selected by the King of Spain and confirmed by Pope Alexander VII on 10 November 1659 as Bishop of Coria. In 1660, he was consecrated bishop by Diego Arce Reinoso, Bishop Emeritus of Plasencia. On 2 July 1663, he was appointed during the papacy of Pope Alexander VII as Archbishop of Zaragoza. He served as Archbishop of Zaragoza until his death on 22 May 1674. While bishop, he was the principal consecrator of Francisco López de Urraca, Bishop of Bosa (1672).

== External links and additional sources ==
- Cheney, David M. "Archdiocese of Zaragoza". Catholic-Hierarchy.org. (for Chronology of Bishops) ^{[self-published]}
- Chow, Gabriel. "Metropolitan Archdiocese of Zaragoza (Spain)". GCatholic.org. (for Chronology of Bishops) ^{[self-published]}
- Cheney, David M. "Diocese of Coria-Cáceres". Catholic-Hierarchy.org. (for Chronology of Bishops) ^{[self-published]}
- Chow, Gabriel. "Diocese of Coria-Caceres (Spain)". GCatholic.org. (for Chronology of Bishops) ^{[self-published]}

Catholic Church titles
Preceded by Diego López de la Vega	Bishop of Coria; 1659–1663	Succeeded by Gabriel Vázquez Saavedra y Rojas
Preceded by Juan Cebrián Pedro	Archbishop of Zaragoza; 1663–1674	Succeeded by Francisco Lara (archbishop)
