= Francisco de Zapata y Mendoza =

Spanish Roman Catholic prelate

Most Reverend Francisco de Zapata y Mendoza
- Bishop of Coria
- Church: Catholic Church
- Diocese: Diocese of Coria
- In office: 1649–1655
- Predecessor: Pedro Urbina Montoya
- Successor: Antonio Sarmiento de Luna y Enríquez

Personal details
- Born: 1599 Madrid, Spain
- Died: 1655 (age 56 Coria, Cáceres, Spain

Francisco de Zapata y Mendoza (1599–1655) was a Roman Catholic prelate and Bishop of Coria (1649–1655).

He was born in Madrid, Spain. On 13 September 1649, he was appointed during the papacy of Pope Innocent X as Bishop of Coria. He served as Bishop of Coria until he died in 1655.

== External links and additional sources ==
- Cheney, David M. "Diocese of Coria-Cáceres". Catholic-Hierarchy.org. (for Chronology of Bishops) ^{[self-published]}
- Chow, Gabriel. "Diocese of Coria-Caceres (Spain)". GCatholic.org. (for Chronology of Bishops) ^{[self-published]}

Catholic Church titles
| Preceded by Pedro Urbina Montoya | Bishop of Coria; 1649–1655 | Succeeded by Antonio Sarmiento de Luna y Enríquez |
