= José María Setién =

José María Seitén Alberro
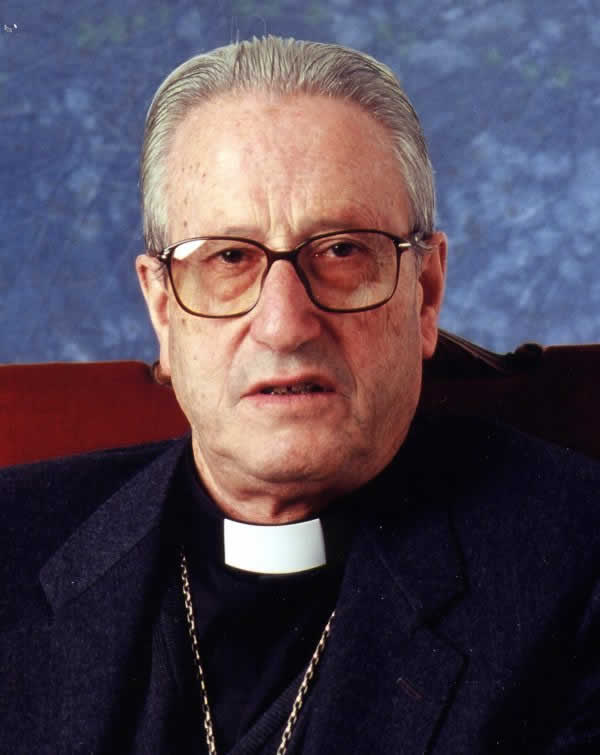
- Official portrait
- Diocese: Diocese of Santander
- See: Bishop of San Sebastián
- In office: 1979–2000
- Predecessor: Jacinto Argaya Goicoechea
- Successor: Juan María Uriarte Goiricelaya

Orders
- Ordination: 1951 by Jaime Font y Andreu
- Consecration: 1972 by Jacinto Argaya Goicoechea

Personal details
- Born: José María Setién Alberro; 18 March 1928 Hernani, Spain
- Died: 10 July 2018 (aged 90) San Sebastián, Spain
- Denomination: Catholic

José María Setién Alberro (18 March 1928 – 10 July 2018) was a Spanish Catholic prelate. He was auxiliary bishop of San Sebastián between 1972 and 1979, and bishop between 1979 and 2000.

== Career ==
After the murder of the socialist Enrique Casas by ETA, María Setién prohibited having the funeral at the cathedral of San Sebastian. During the 1998 truce, he stated that the Constitution of Spain must have the self-determination of the Basque people. In the same year he offered himself to intercede for the politician prisoners. John Paul II expressed to the Episcopal Conference of Spain he did not like it. Finally, the Holy See interceded on it in 2009 and he renounced for health problems.

In 2007, he published Un obispo vasco ante ETA. In 2003, he was awarded the Gold Medal of Guipúzcoa.

He died on 10 July 2018 after suffering a stroke at age 90.
