= San Sebastián Cathedral =

Church in Donostia/San Sebastián, Spain

Good Shepherd Cathedral of San Sebastián Artzain Onaren katedrala Catedral del Buen Pastor de San Sebastián
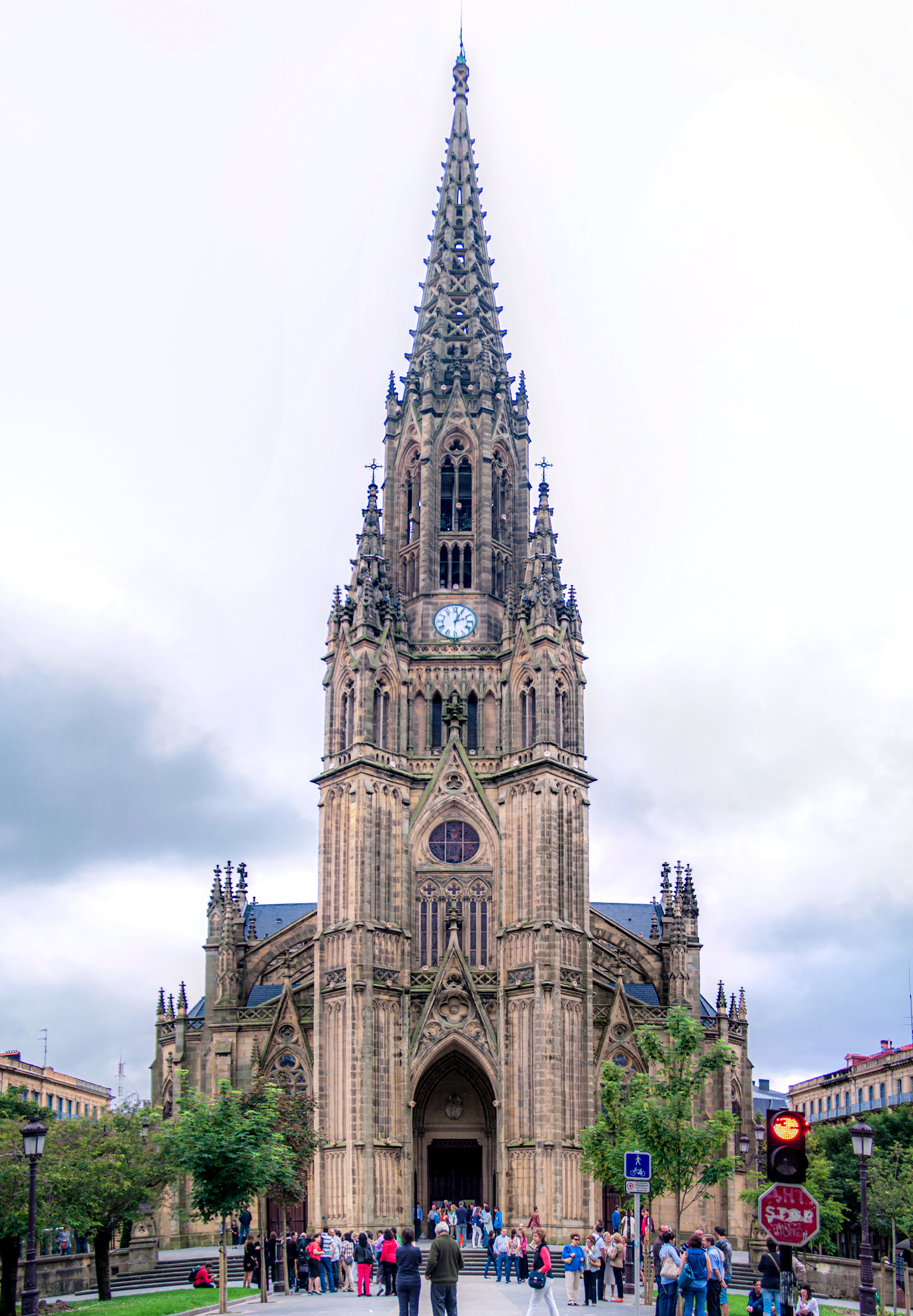

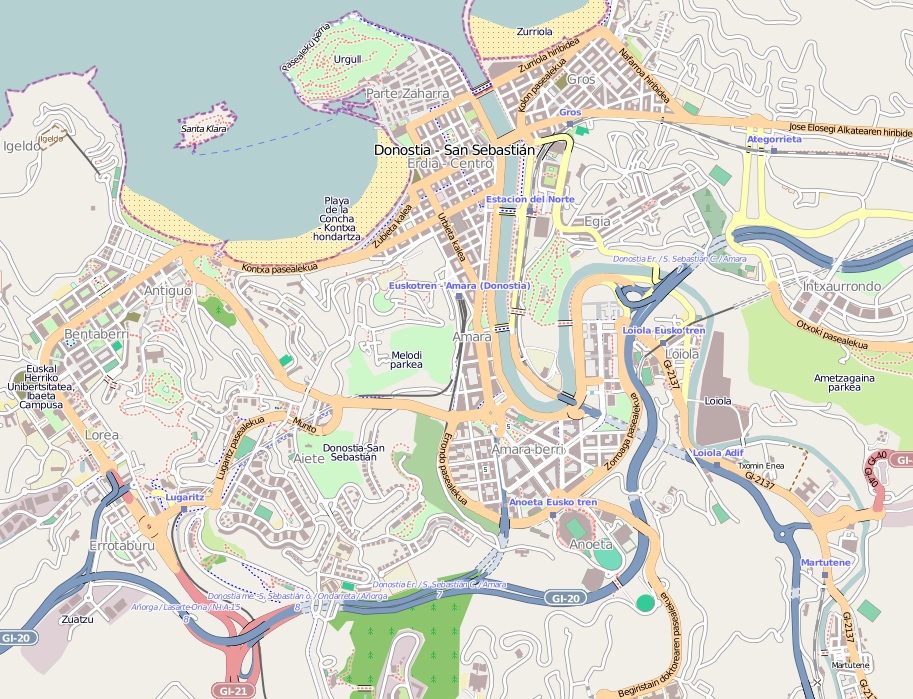
- Location within Donostia

Religion
- Affiliation: Roman Catholic
- Ecclesiastical or organisational status: Cathedral
- Leadership: Mons. José Ignacio Munilla Aguirre
- Year consecrated: 30 July 1897

Location
- Location: San Sebastián, Spain
- Coordinates: 43°19′0″N 1°58′53.4″W

Architecture
- Architect: Manuel de Echave
- Type: Church
- Style: Gothic Revival
- Groundbreaking: 1888
- Completed: 1897
- Construction cost: 1 500 000 pesetas

Specifications
- Direction of façade: NW
- Capacity: 4000
- Length: 90 metres (300 ft)
- Width: 43 metres (141 ft)
- Width (nave): 14 metres (46 ft)
- Height (max): 25 metres (82 ft)
- Spire: 1
- Spire height: 75 metres (246 ft)

Website
- elizagipuzkoa.org

The Cathedral of the Good Shepherd (Basque: Artzain Onaren katedrala, Spanish: Catedral del Buen Pastor de San Sebastián) located in the city of San Sebastián, Gipuzkoa, Basque Country, Spain. It is the seat of the Diocese of San Sebastián, a suffragan see to the Archdiocese of Pamplona y Tudela. The most remarkable religious building of San Sebastián, it is endowed with a strong verticality and is the largest in Gipuzkoa. Its construction took place in the last years of the 19th century in a Historicist Neo-Gothic style. The church, dedicated to the Good Shepherd, has held the rank of cathedral since 1953.

== History ==
In 1881 a Royal Order created a new parish division in San Sebastián. This new division included the creation of a parish, claimed for years by locals in the southern part of the city, which later became known as the "Ensanche of Amara". In August 1887 the City Council gave an area between the river Urumea and Beach of La Concha, occupied by sand dunes and marshes, to build the church. Until it was finished, the spiritual needs of the local congregation were met by a provisional parish, dedicated to the Sacred Heart of Jesus. Opened in March 1888, this rudimentary church was made of wood and was between Loiola and Príncipe Streets.

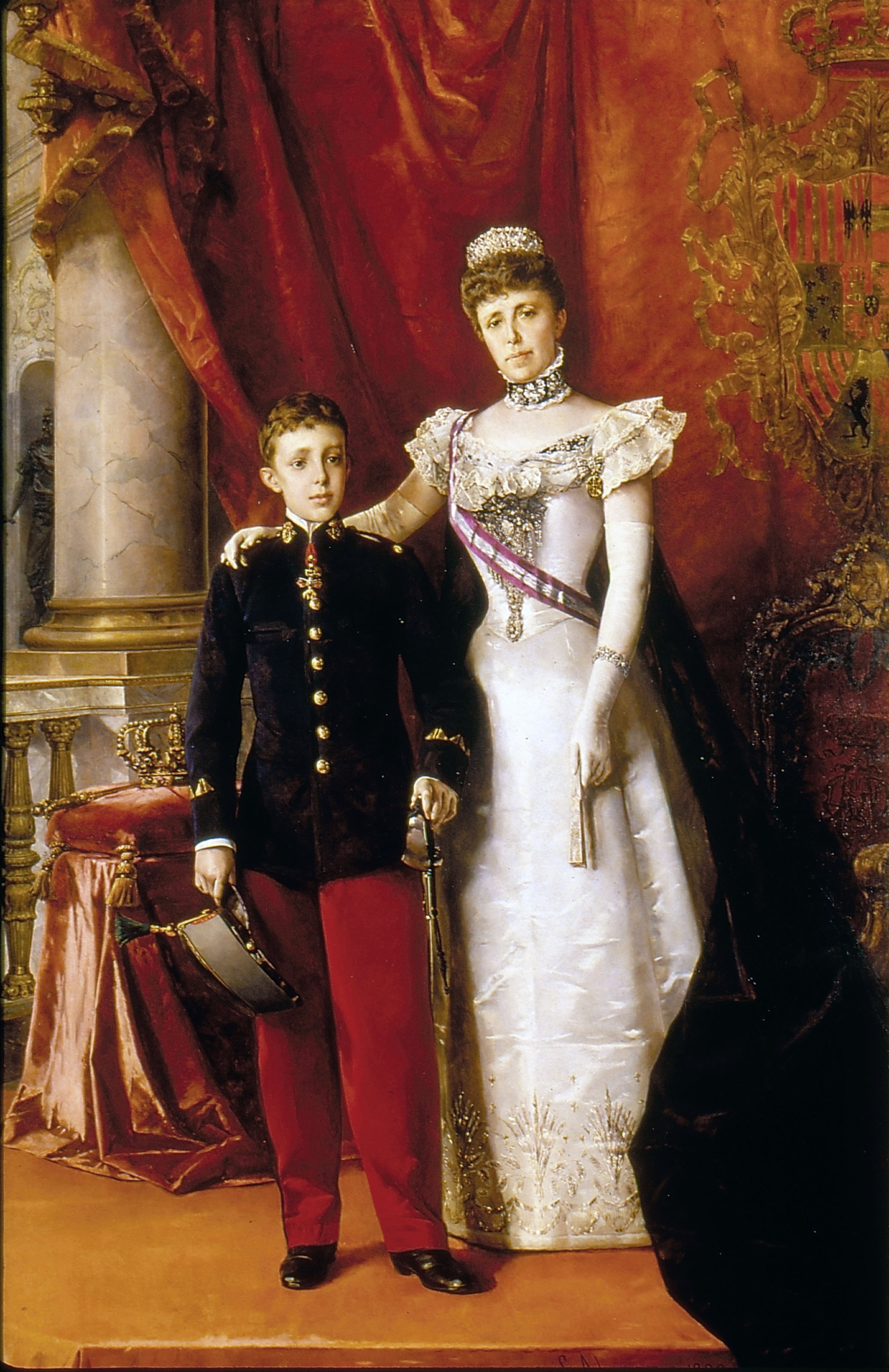
The queen regent, Maria Christina of Austria, and her son, King Alfonso XIII, opened the church in 1897

In December 1887 a construction meeting chaired by the Dean D. Martín Lorenzo de Urizar Zalduegui-Ariño defined the bases of the project competition and set a budget of 750,000 pesetas, and like the capacity of the church and its architectural style, it should be pointed. Four projects were presented, with the chosen design being by the donostiarra architect Manuel de Echave, who was entrusted with the supervision of works. The new church would be dedicated to the Good Shepherd.

The Spanish royal family, who were vacationing in the city, were invited to the laying of the foundation stone. The events took place on September 29, 1888. The queen regent, Maria Christina, her children and the Infante Antonio, along with ministers and other officials, attended the solemn mass that the diocesan bishop D. Mariano Miguel Gómez held in the provisional parish church of the Sacred Heart. Following the ceremony, the royal entourage moved to the site of the new church and there proceeded to lay the foundation stone, which covered a lead box in which were enclosed pictures of the Pope and the royal family, various coins of the time and copies of the Gazette of Madrid and of the Ecclesiastical Gazette. The minutes of the ceremony were signed by the baby king Alfonso XIII, aged two years and four months, for which his mother had to take his hand. It is the first signature of Alfonso XIII on an official document.

Manuel de Echave went on to oversee the works having as master of the same José Vicente Mendía and, after his (Mendia) death, the master mason Agustín de Zumalabe. The foundation work required a careful drainage of the site to provide consolidated sand. For the general architecture the sandstone quarries of Mount Igeldo were chosen. The vaults were made with tufa from Ocio and slate roofs were brought from Angers (France). The workers were all Basques. For the size of the stone of the capitals, ornaments, windows and needles that decorate the interior and exterior, the models presented by the local artist Julio Gargallo were accepted.

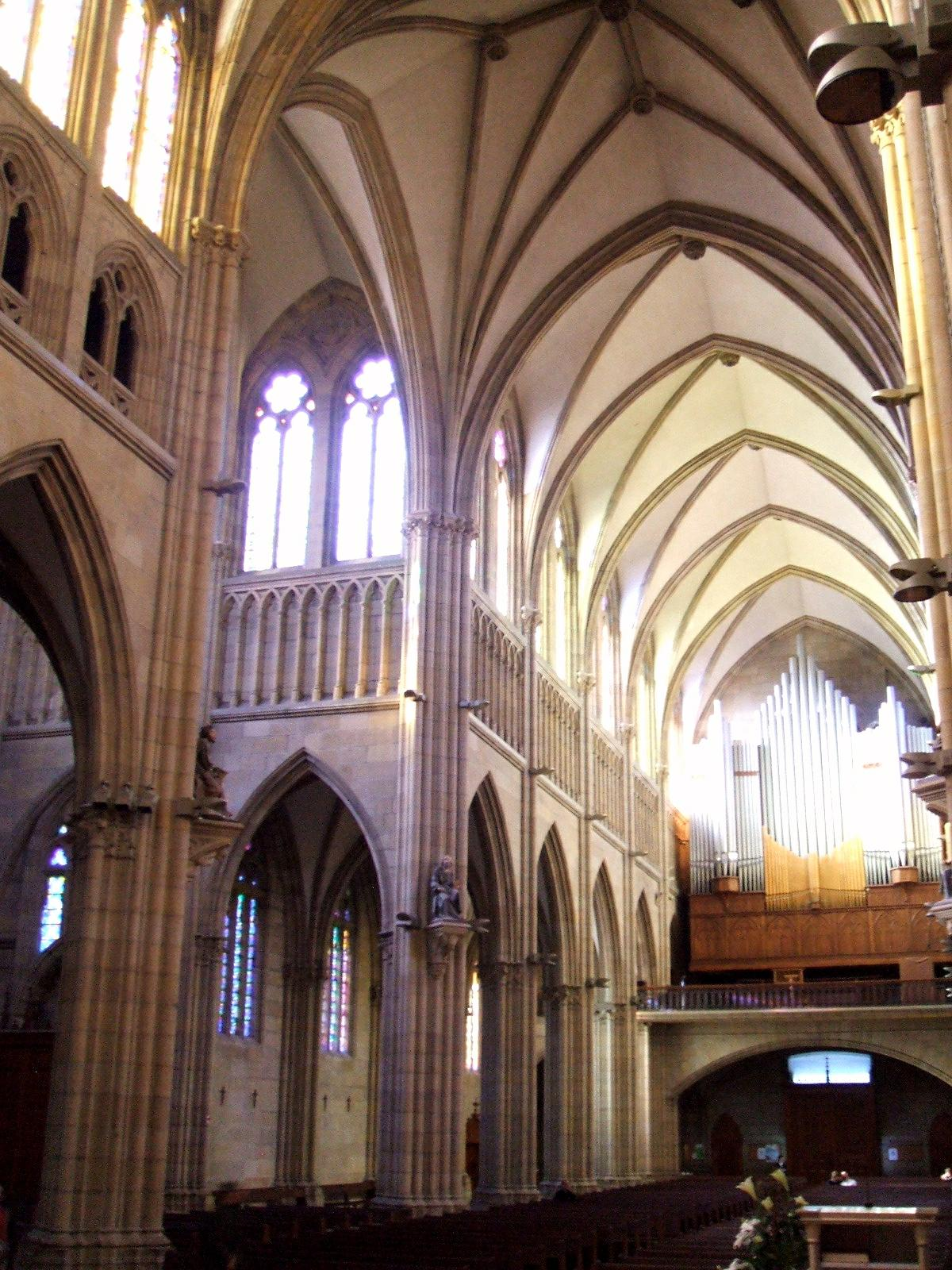
View of the interior of the cathedral

After just nine years of work (including almost two in which work was suspended for lack of resources, and the tower was not yet crowned), the Church of the Good Shepherd was consecrated for worship on July 30, 1897. Again, the royal family, the Queen Regent María Cristina, King Alfonso XIII and the Infanta María Teresa attended the grand ceremony. The mass was officiated by D. Ramón Fernández de Piérola, Bishop of Vitoria, the diocese to which then belonged Guipuzkoa. The tower was completed in 1899 under the direction of Ramón Cortázar. In the end, the construction of the church cost more than 1,500,000 pesetas, and that was not including the altars and altarpieces.

Pope Pius XII's papal bull Quo Commodius of November 2, 1949, created, beside the Diocese of Bilbao, the Diocese of San Sebastián seceding from the Diocese of Vitoria. The first bishop of San Sebastian was the Catalan ecclesiastic Jaime Font i Andreu, appointed to office on May 13, 1950, and took office on September 3 that year. With the need to choose a Donostiarra church to host the local diocese, the choice was, by its magnificence and modernity, the Church of the Good Shepherd. On July 30, 1953, finally, the church achieved the rank of Cathedral with the consecration of the new altar, acting as pastor D. Ignacio Lasquibar Olaciregui, who in 1954 took over from D. Román Mendiguchia.

After four years of reforms and changes that were needed to put the church to its new use as a diocesan church. For this the presbytery was transformed with the installation of a new table after the removal of the original altar, of a florid Gothic style, carved in cedar wood by the Barcelonese workshops of Juan Riera, it was replaced by choir stalls and an image of the Good Shepherd. The Chapel of the Immaculate Conception was transformed into a chapter house, and the Chapel of Christ, in the crypt, became the new parish vestry, leaving the former sacristy for the exclusive service of the council.

In 1972, Bishop Jacinto Argaya Goicoechea undertook a second improvement of the church to mark the 75th anniversary of his inauguration. The neo-gothic pulpit made by Nicolás Medive, which was attached to one of the pillars, was removed. Also removed were the altars dedicated to Our Lady of Sorrows, Virgin of the Rosary and Virgin of the Pillar. The roofs and windows were restored and walls and vaults were cleaned. The old floor of American oak was replaced by a new one in marble. The interior lighting was improved and new benches were installed.

== Description ==
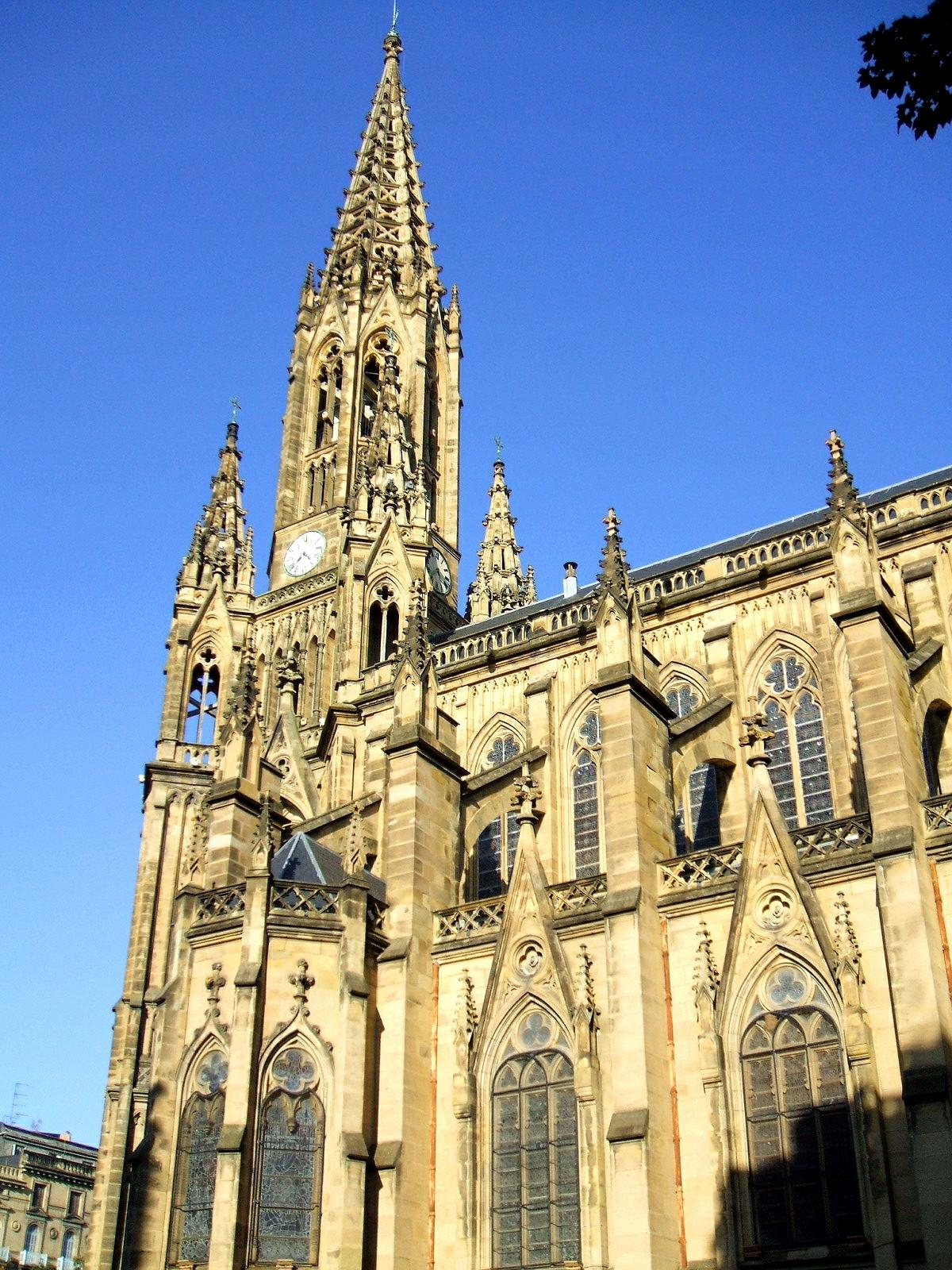
View of a facade of the cathedral

In the plans of the architect Manuel de Echave, who apparently was inspired by Cologne Cathedral, the dimensions of the church consist of:

- an area of 1,915 square metres (20,610 sq ft),
- a nave height of 25 metres (82 ft),
- a tower of 75 metres (246 ft),
- a central nave of 64 metres (210 ft) long by 36 metres (118 ft) wide at the crossing,
- and a capacity of 4,000 people.

This is a church with a Latin cross, three longitudinal aisles, transept nave and a pentagonal sanctuary. There is no ambulatory. The two gables of the transept house two large rose windows that accentuate the light inside the church. The naves up to the crossing, of which the wider and the highest is the central, are segmented into five rectangular sections covered with four-parts vaults of simple ribbing. The two arms of the transept consist of two sections arched in the same way. The crossing is the only section that features complex ribbing, incorporating tiercerons between the main veins. From the crossing to the head, the naves are extended with three sections. In this posterior space, the four aisles, two on each side, balance the width of the transept, resulting in two separate areas of equal height and divided into six sections separated by four pillars. The slender bell tower, located on the portico of the entrance, is clearly inspired by the spires of the Cologne Cathedral. The set of pilasters and buttresses terminating in pinnacles and spirelets decorated with buds enhance the verticality of the building.

=== Indoor furniture ===
The Main Chapel, since the reform of 1972, appears austerely furnished by choir stalls worked by the Goicoechea y Arín workshop of Vitoria. On it, resting on a pedestal that hangs from the central boss of the apse, the sculpture of the Good Shepherd, which was on the original Neo-gothic altar. A work of the Barcelonan artist Joseph Llimona, also maker of the figures of the Four Evangelists, from the old altar and which today are on the pillars of the crossing. Under the rose windows of the transept the initial design included two small pedestrian doors that were finally replaced by two altarpieces, of Neo-Gothic style and gold-covered, these were placed as the devotions of the Sacred Heart of Jesus and the Immaculate Conception of Mary. They were installed in 1907 and 1917. Other items of interest are the altars and shrines of the Holy Family, Our Lady of Mount Carmel, Saint Anthony and Francis of Assisi, works by Julio Gargallo. This artist also worked on the altars of Teresa of Ávila and Our Lady of Perpetual Help. The sculpture of the Our Lady of the Rosary presided over an altar that was decommissioned in 1972.

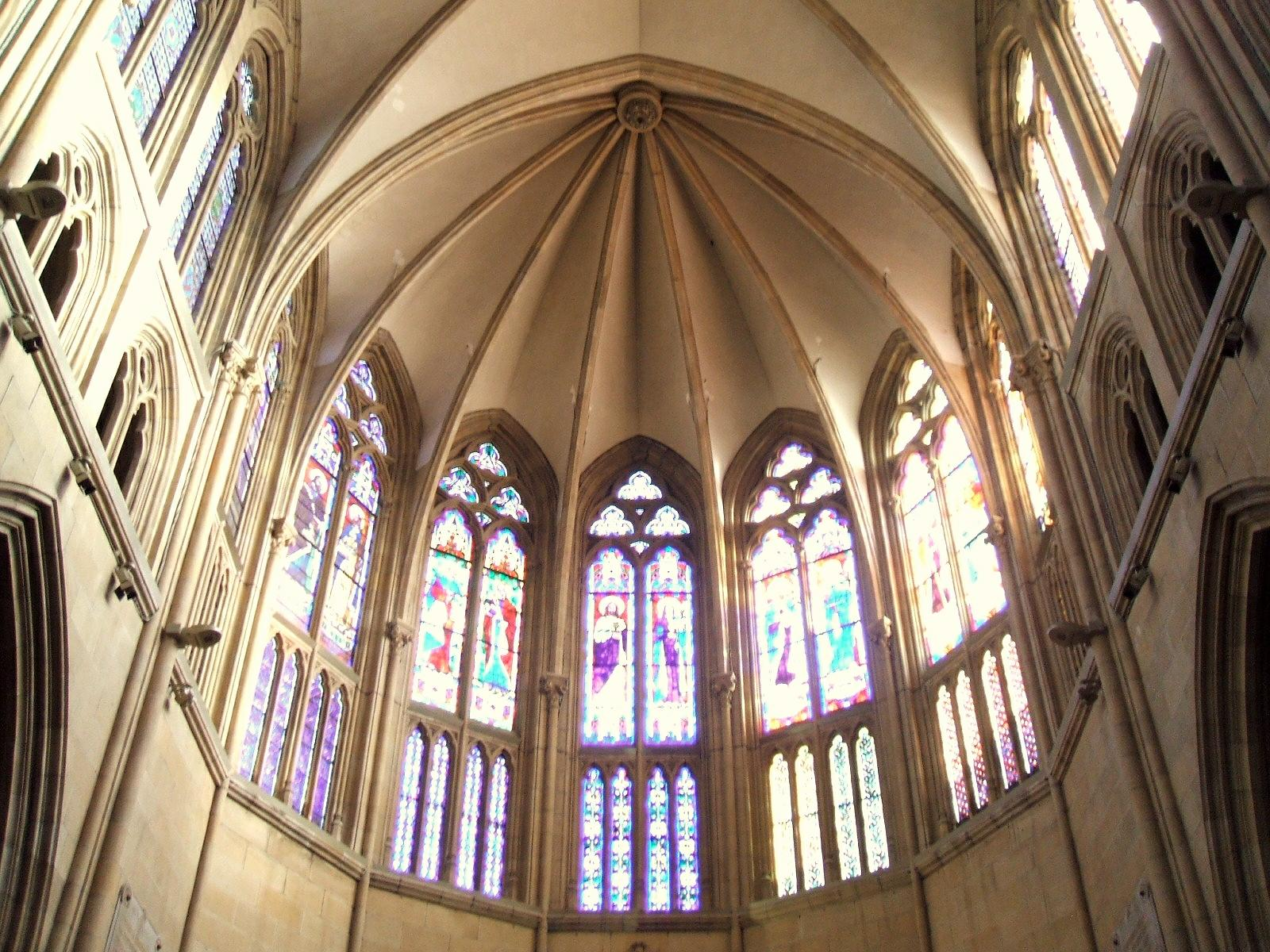
Windows of the header

==== Crypt ====
Located under the presbytery, the crypt functions as parish sacristy since the reform of 1949–1953. The remains of the first parish priest, D. Martín Lorenzo de Urizar, are entombed here.

==== Stained Glass ====
The cathedral's stained glass was designed by Juan Bautista Lázaro and made by the workshop of Bolinaga and Cía., from León, and Pujol, from Barcelona. That which occupies the seven double windows of the apse represents the twelve apostles and the Sacred Hearts of Jesus and Mary. There are also figurative windows in the baptistry. The rest of the stained glass is incorporated in double (at top) and triple (at bottom) windows and runs around most of the side walls. Two rose windows open at the ends of the transept.

==== Organ ====
The current organ is the second that has been in the cathedral. It was installed in 1954. According to data published at the time, it was the largest organ in Spain and one of the largest in Europe. Its main console consists of five keyboards for hands, one for feet and 106 stops; also, in the presbytery lies an "echo organ" with two manual keyboards, pedals and 20 stops. The choir organ houses in its interior and exterior 9,535 pipes, the largest measures 10 meters, the whole thing weighing 30 tons. The huge instrument cost more than 1.5 million pesetas, thanks to the legacy of the Fermín Lasala, Duke of Mandas (1832–1917). It was built by Organería Española, of Azpeitia, and its pumps, of several horsepower, were purchased from the workshop of Meindinger from Basel.

== Gallery ==
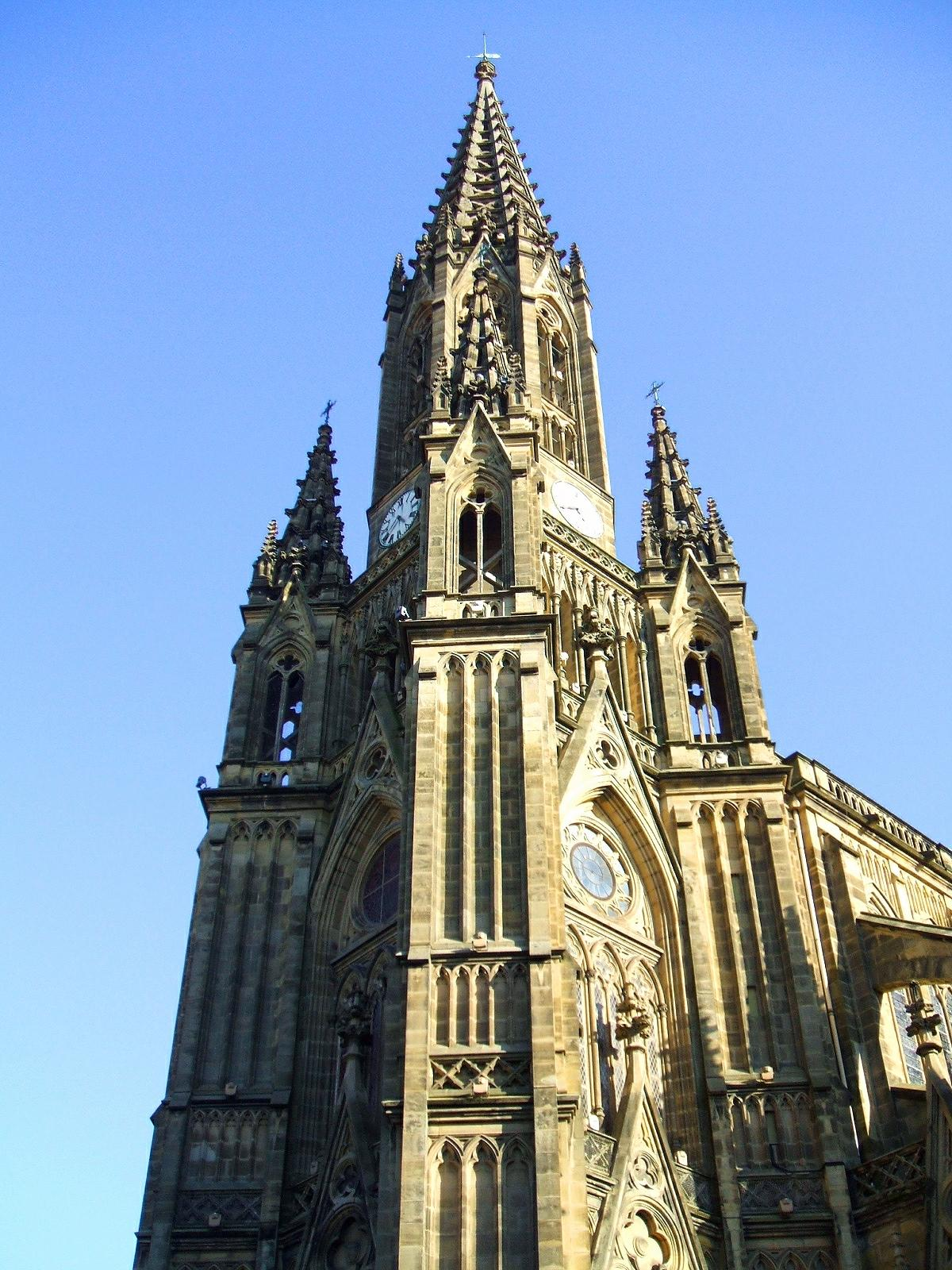
Tower

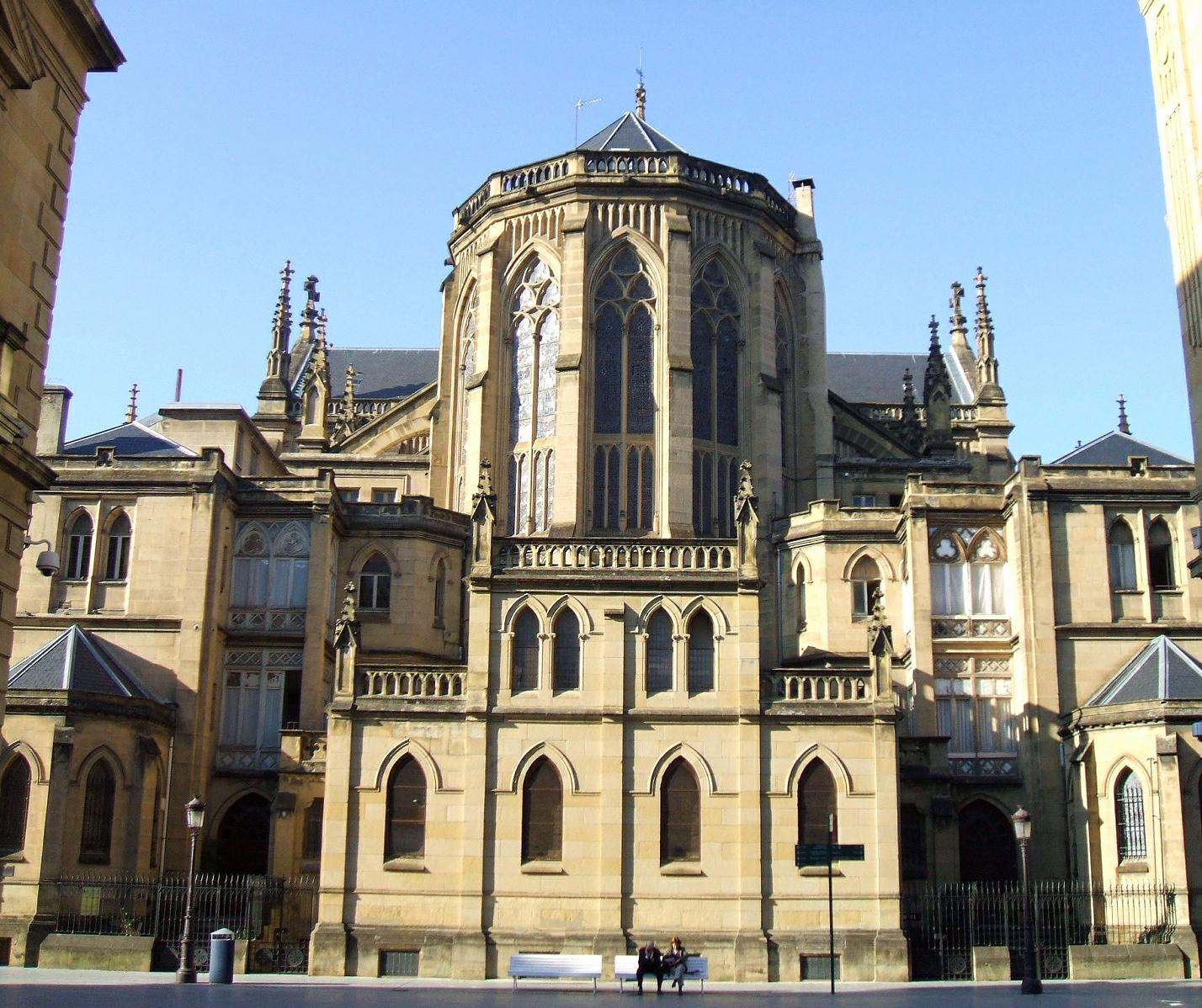
Apse

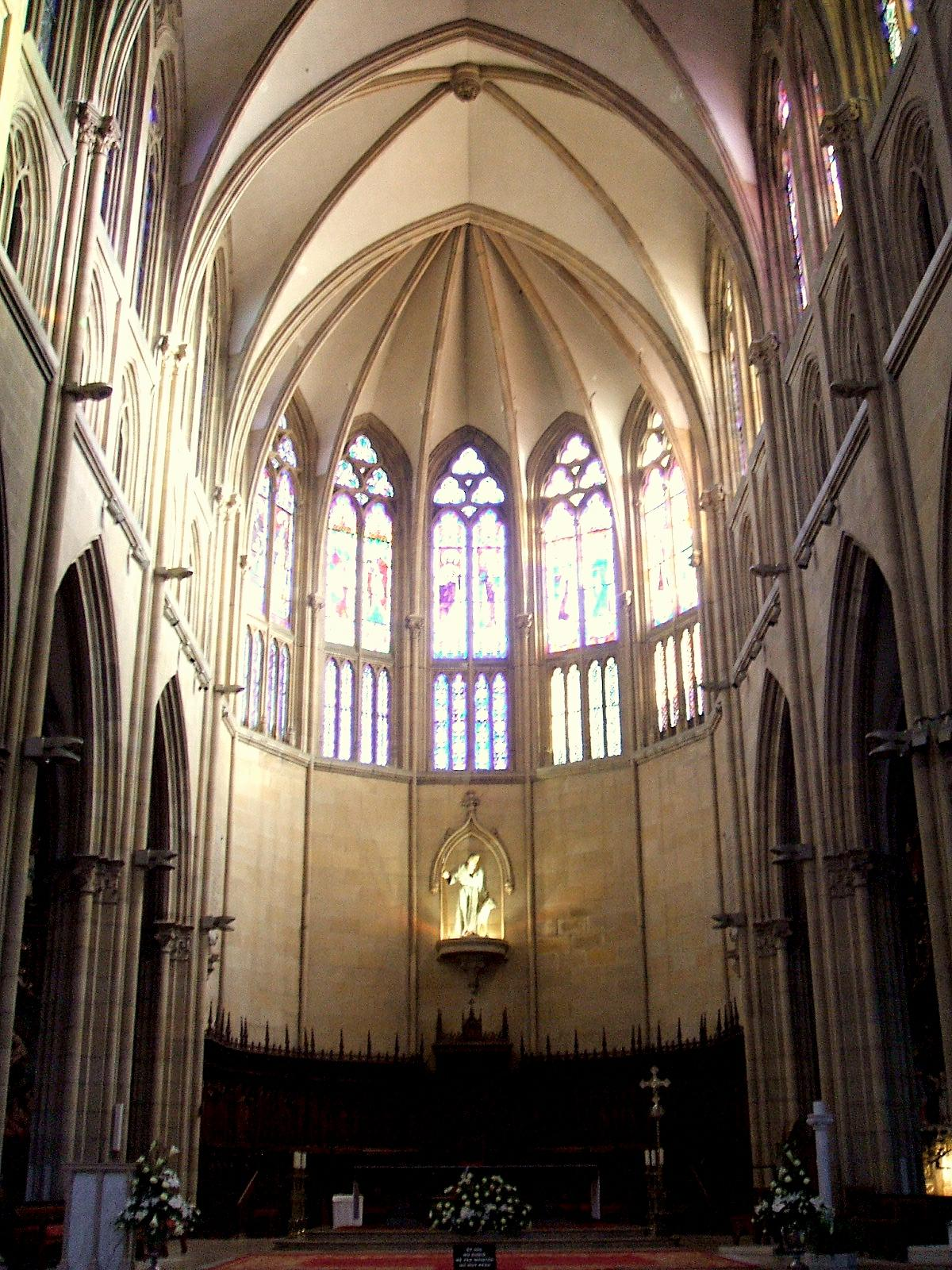
Header

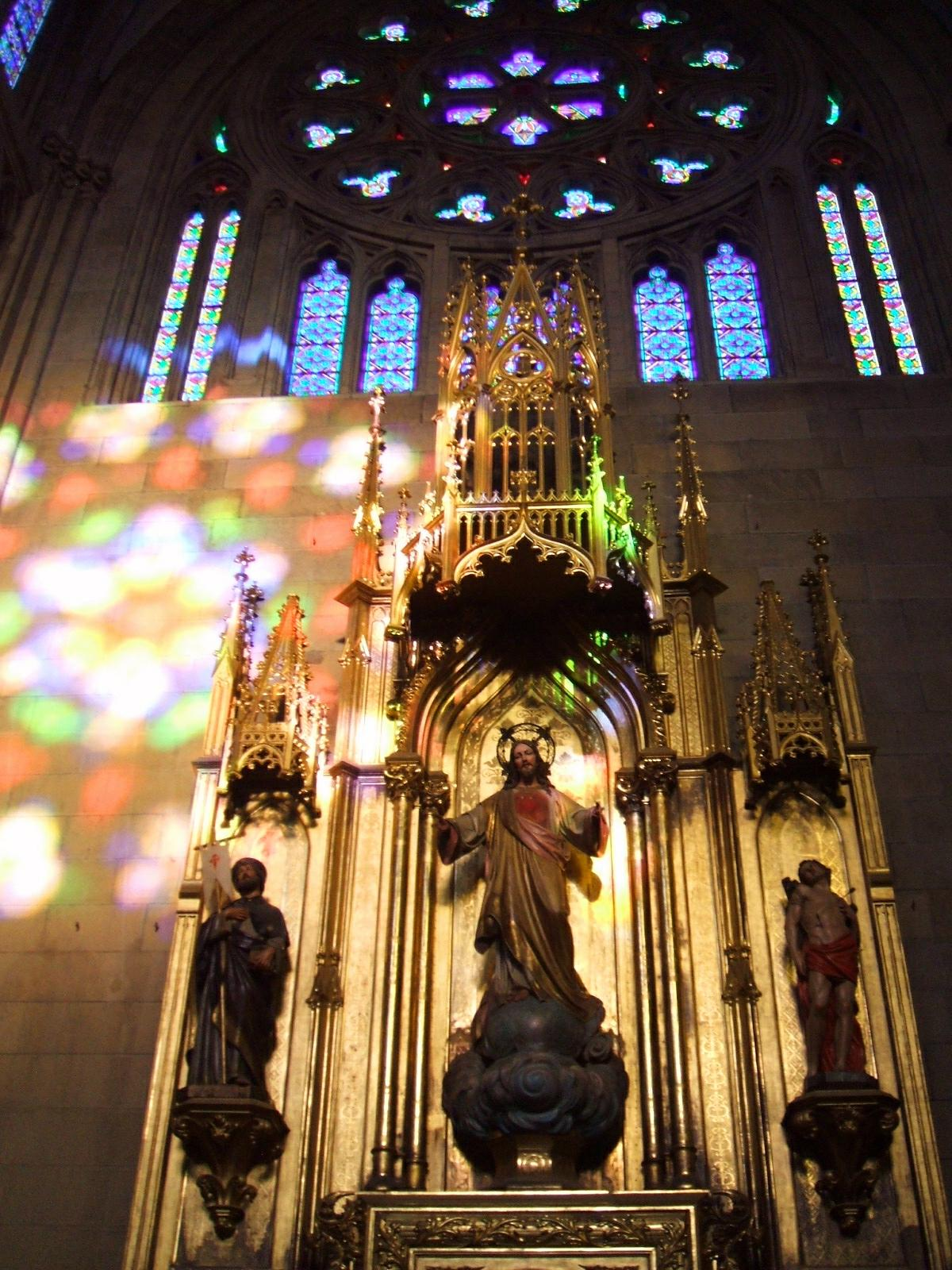
Altarpiece of the Sacred Heart of Jesus

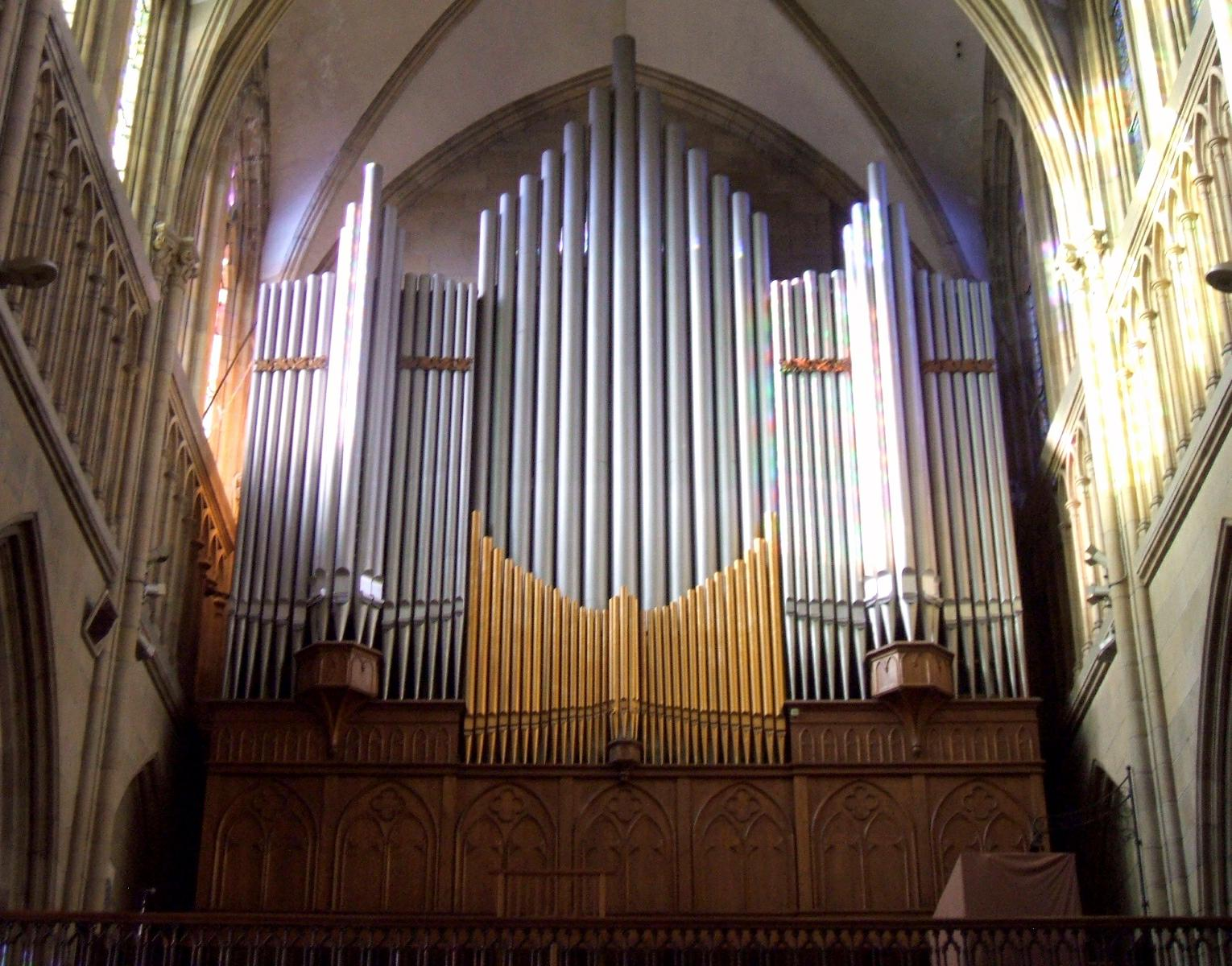
Organ

== Bibliography ==
- Murugarren, Luis (1996). Catedral de El Buen Pastor. Donostia-San Sebastián, 1897-1997. San Sebastian: Kutxa Social and Cultural Foundation. ISBN 84-7173-288-2.
