= Juan Arroyo (bishop) =

Roman Catholic bishop

Most Reverend Juan Arroyo
- Titular Bishop of Utica; Auxiliary Bishop of Seville
- Church: Catholic Church
- Archdiocese: Archdiocese of Seville
- In office: 1654–1656

Orders
- Consecration: 1655 by Pedro Tapia

Personal details
- Died: 16 December 1656 Seville, Spain

Juan Arroyo (died 16 December 1656) was a Roman Catholic prelate who served as Auxiliary Bishop of Seville (1654–1656).

== Biography ==
On 7 December 1654, Juan Arroyo was appointed during the papacy of Pope Innocent X as Auxiliary Bishop of Seville and Titular Bishop of Utica. In 1655, he was consecrated bishop by Pedro Tapia, Archbishop of Seville. He served as Auxiliary Bishop of Seville until his death on 16 December 1656.

== See also ==
- Catholic Church in Spain

== External links and additional sources ==
- Cheney, David M. "Archdiocese of Sevilla {Seville}". Catholic-Hierarchy.org. (for Chronology of Bishops) ^{[self-published]}
- Chow, Gabriel. "Metropolitan Archdiocese of Sevilla (Italy)". GCatholic.org. (for Chronology of Bishops) ^{[self-published]}
