= Vincenza Matilde Testaferrata =

Maltese baroness and member of the Inquisition

Vincenza Matilde Testaferrata née Perdicomati Bologna dei Conti della Catena, was a Maltese baroness. She served in the office of Depositario of the Inquisition in Malta in 1760–1778.

== Life ==
In 1752 she married a cousin, Baron Paolo Testaferrata Abela, Patrizio Messina e Roma, (1736-1760), 3rd Barone di Gomerino, with whom she had several children. Her spouse held the office of 'Depositario' within the Inquisition. The Depositario headed the administrative staff of the Inquisitor's Tribunal as well as being the accountant of the court, thereby in charge of all payments, including the Inquisitor's salary.

When she became a widow in 1760, she succeeded her spouse in his office. She did this because the office was inherited from father to son in the family of her spouse, and by the time of her husband's death, she was pregnant, and gave birth to their first son, Pietro Paolo Testaferrata, only after her spouse's death. With the exception of a short period, she remained in office until 1778. This was an unprecedented achievement, as women normally did not hold any of the offices of the Inquisition.

She temporarily gave up the office in 1762 of her own inclination to her late spouse's uncle Canon Testaferrata, who was the preferred choice of Inquisitor Durinito. However, Canon Testaferrata accepted the office unwillingly; he pointed out that he was old and that the inheritance right to the office must be protected for her son, and after his death in 1763, she accepted to resume the office until her son became of legal majority. The Inquisitor Guilio Carpegna, praised her for her service in the office and referred to her as 'the prototype of a titled Maltese Lady".

In 1778, her son was declared of legal majority at the age of seventeen and she retired to make him the 14th member of the family to hold the office; he was also the last, as the Inquisition was abolished in 1798.

Her correspondence has been preserved.
