= Bidania-Goiatz =

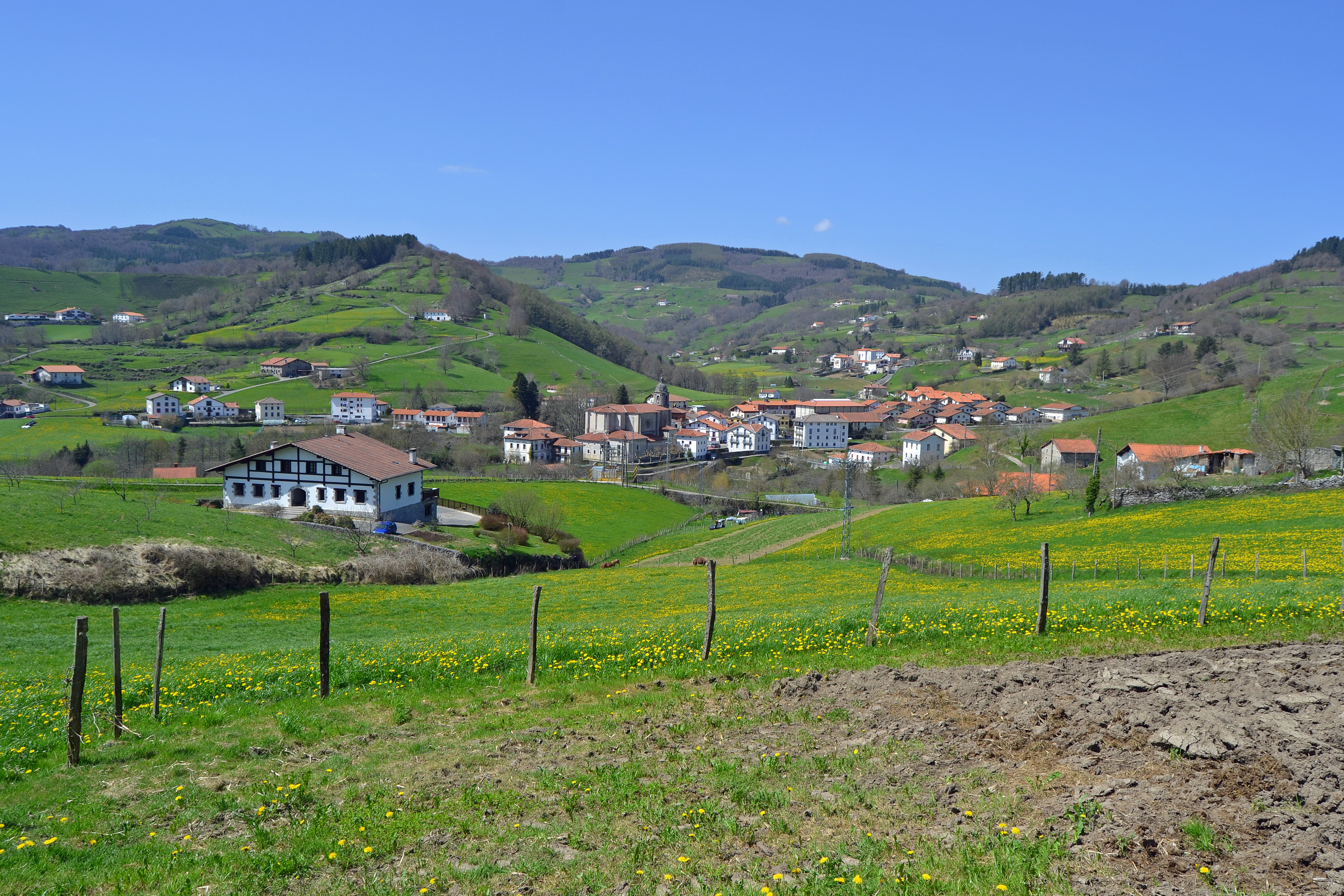
- View of Bidania-Goiatz

- Coat of arms

- Location of Bidania-Goiatz within the Basque Country
- Coordinates: 43°8′27″N 2°9′30″W
- Country: Spain
- Autonomous community: Gipuzkoa

Area
  - Total: 13.37 km^{2} (5.16 sq mi)
- Elevation: 485 m (1,591 ft)

Population (2025-01-01)
  - Total: 530
  - Density: 40/km^{2} (100/sq mi)
- Time zone: UTC+1 (CET)
  - Summer (DST): UTC+2 (CEST)

Bidania-Goiatz (Spanish: Bidegoyan) is a town located in the province of Gipuzkoa, in the Autonomous Community of Basque Country, in the North of Spain.

It consists of the two villages of Bidania and Goiatz. Bidania is known for having an organ built by Aristide Cavaillé-Coll in its church.
