= Pedro de Godoy =

Spanish Catholic bishop and theologian (1599–1677)

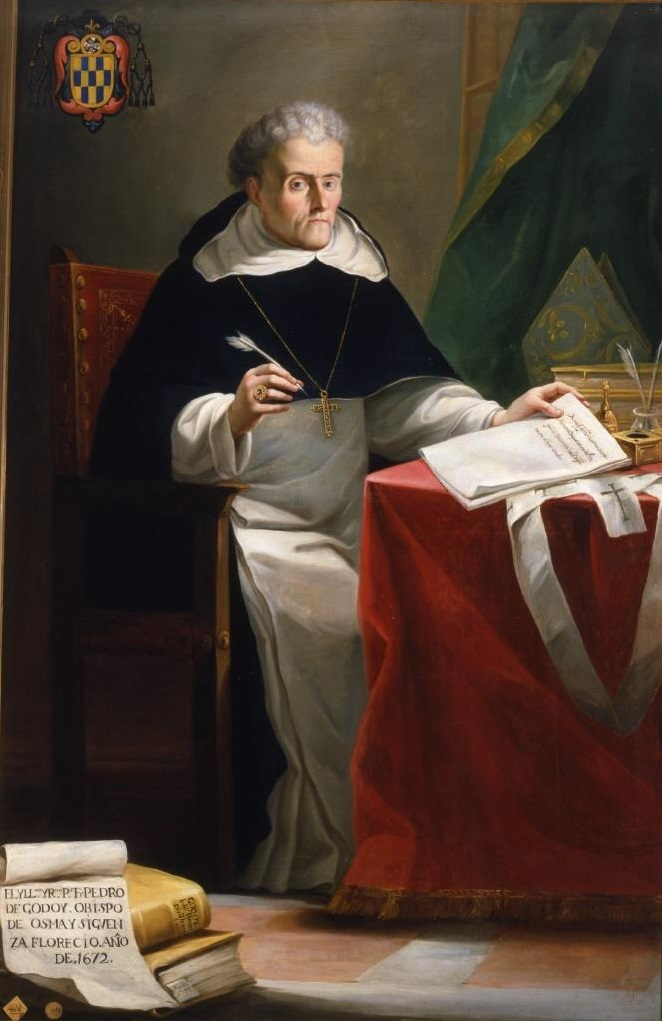
Fray Pedro de Godoy, by Mariano Salvador Maella, 1798 (Real Academia de Bellas Artes de San Fernando).

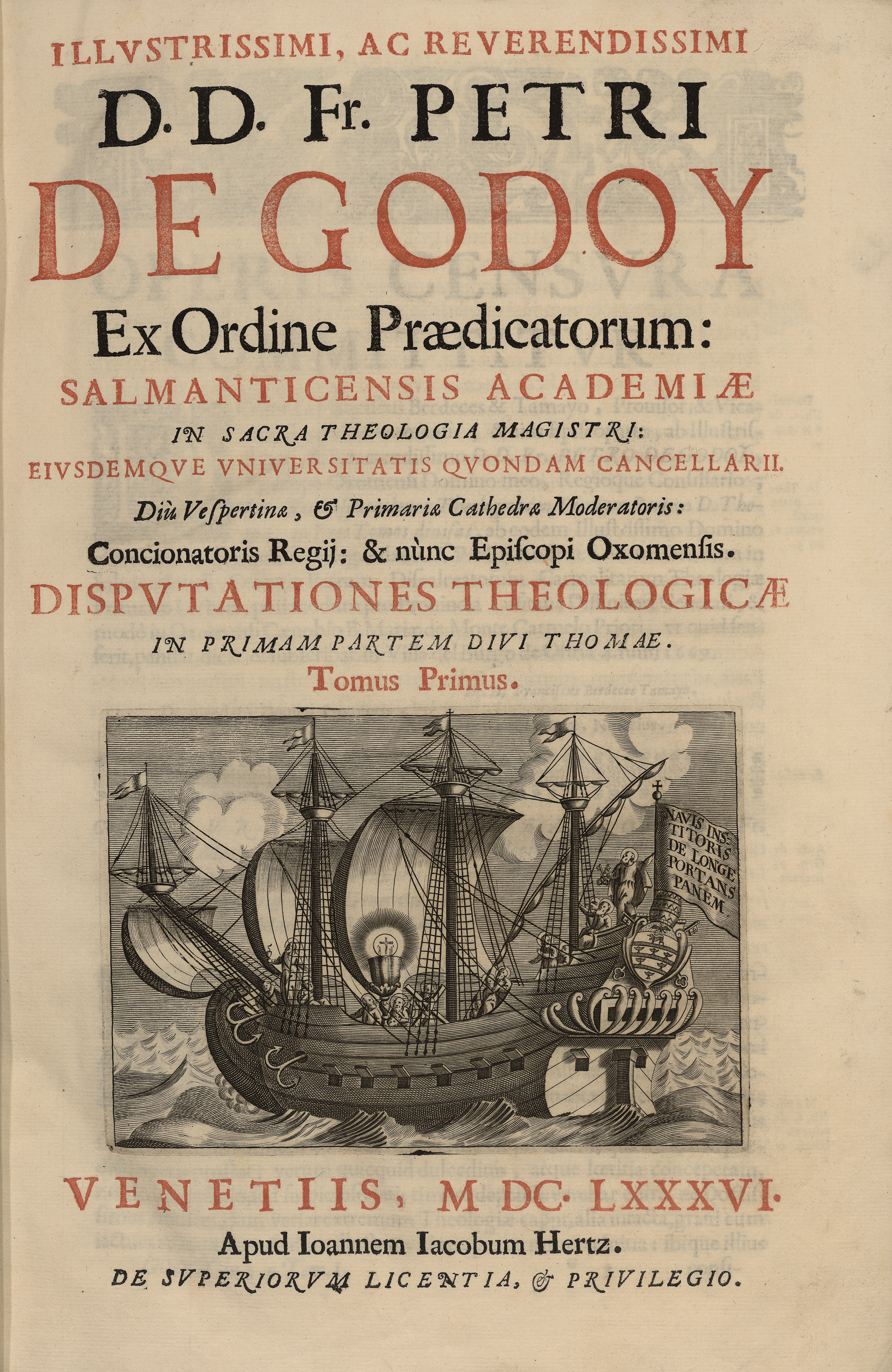
Disputationes theologicae, 1686

Pedro de Godoy (1599 – 1677) was a Spanish Catholic bishop and theologian. He was a Thomist and taught at the University of Salamanca for 25 years.

== Life ==
Born in Aldeanueva de la Vera in 1599, he studied in the Convent of San Esteban in Salamanca, where he later became the prior. He was ordained bishop of Osma in 1664 and then of Sigüenza in 1672 where he died.

As theologian he represented the last outstanding figure of the so-called School of Salamanca. His work Disputationes theologicae is mentioned by many scholars of the 18th century.

== Works ==
- Godoy, Pedro de (1686). Disputationes theologicae. 1 (in Latin). Venetijs: Giovanni Giacomo Hertz.
- Godoy, Pedro de (1686). Disputationes theologicae. 2 (in Latin). Venetijs: Giovanni Giacomo Hertz.
- Godoy, Pedro de (1686). Disputationes theologicae. 3 (in Latin). Venetijs: Giovanni Giacomo Hertz.
- Godoy, Pedro de (1686). Disputationes theologicae. 4 (in Latin). Venetijs: Giovanni Giacomo Hertz.
- Godoy, Pedro de (1686). Disputationes theologicae. 5 (in Latin). Venetijs: Giovanni Giacomo Hertz.
- Godoy, Pedro de (1686). Disputationes theologicae. 6 (in Latin). Venetijs: Giovanni Giacomo Hertz.
- Godoy, Pedro de (1686). Disputationes theologicae. 7 (in Latin). Venetijs: Giovanni Giacomo Hertz.
