= Diocese of San Sebastián =

Roman Catholic diocese in Spain

Coordinates: 43.3167°N 1.9815°W

Diocese of San Sebastián Dioecesis Sancti Sebastiani Diócesis de San Sebastián (es) Donostiako elizbarrutia (eu)

Catholic
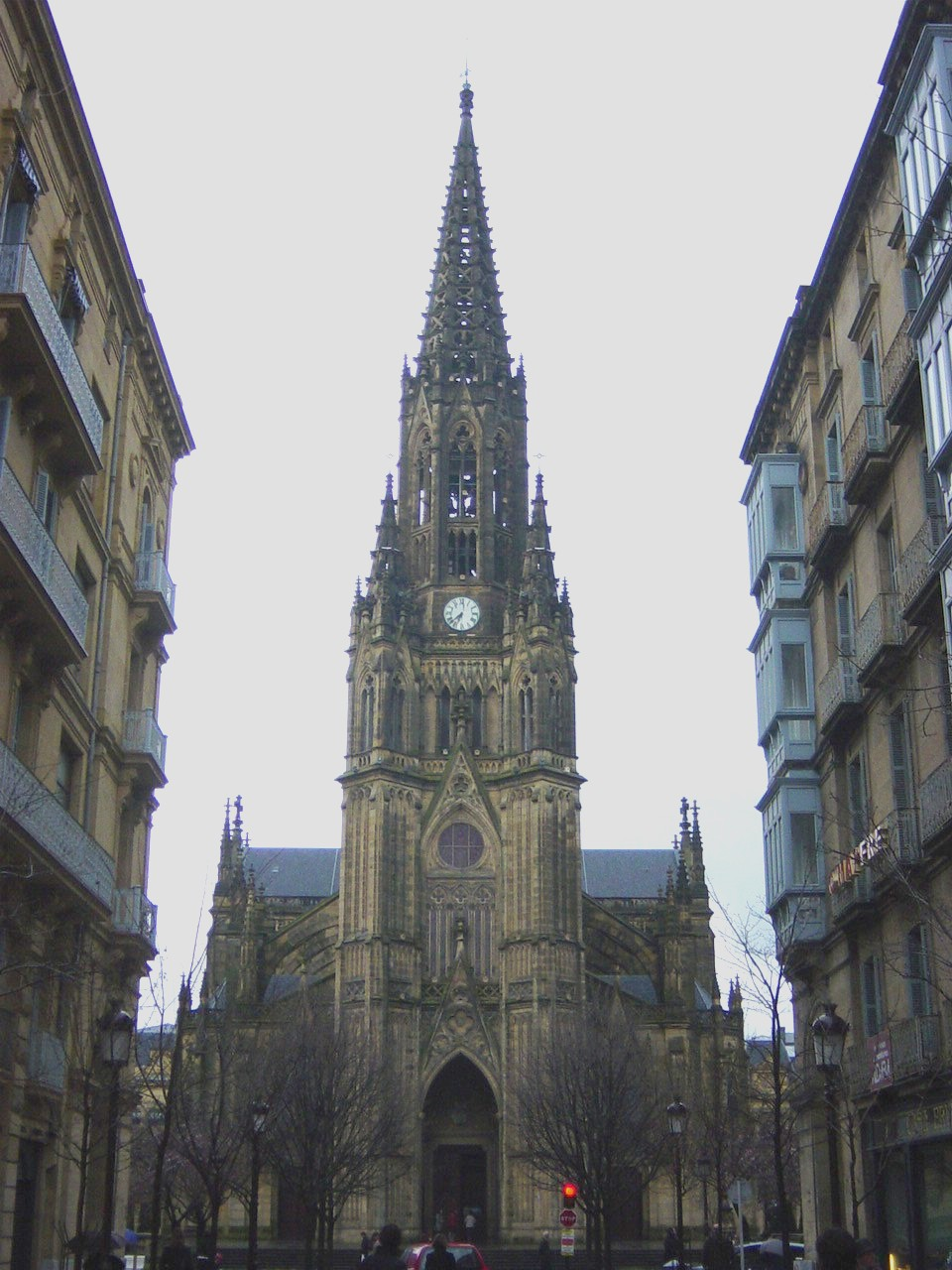
- San Sebastián Cathedral

Location
- Country: Spain
- Ecclesiastical province: Pamplona y Tudela
- Metropolitan: Pamplona y Tudela

Statistics
- Area: 1,977 km^{2} (763 sq mi)
- Population: Total; Catholics: (as of 2004); 684,416; 621,988 (90.9%)

Information
- Rite: Latin Rite
- Established: 2 November 1949
- Cathedral: Cathedral of the Good Shepherd in San Sebastián

Current leadership
- Pope: Leo XIV
- Bishop: Fernando Prado Ayuso
- Metropolitan Archbishop: Florencio Roselló Avellanas

Website
- Website of the Diocese

The Diocese of San Sebastián (Latin: Sancti Sebastiani) is a Latin Church diocese of the Catholic Church located in the city of San Sebastián in the ecclesiastical province of Pamplona y Tudela in Spain.

== History ==
- 2 November 1949: Established as Diocese of San Sebastián

== Special churches ==
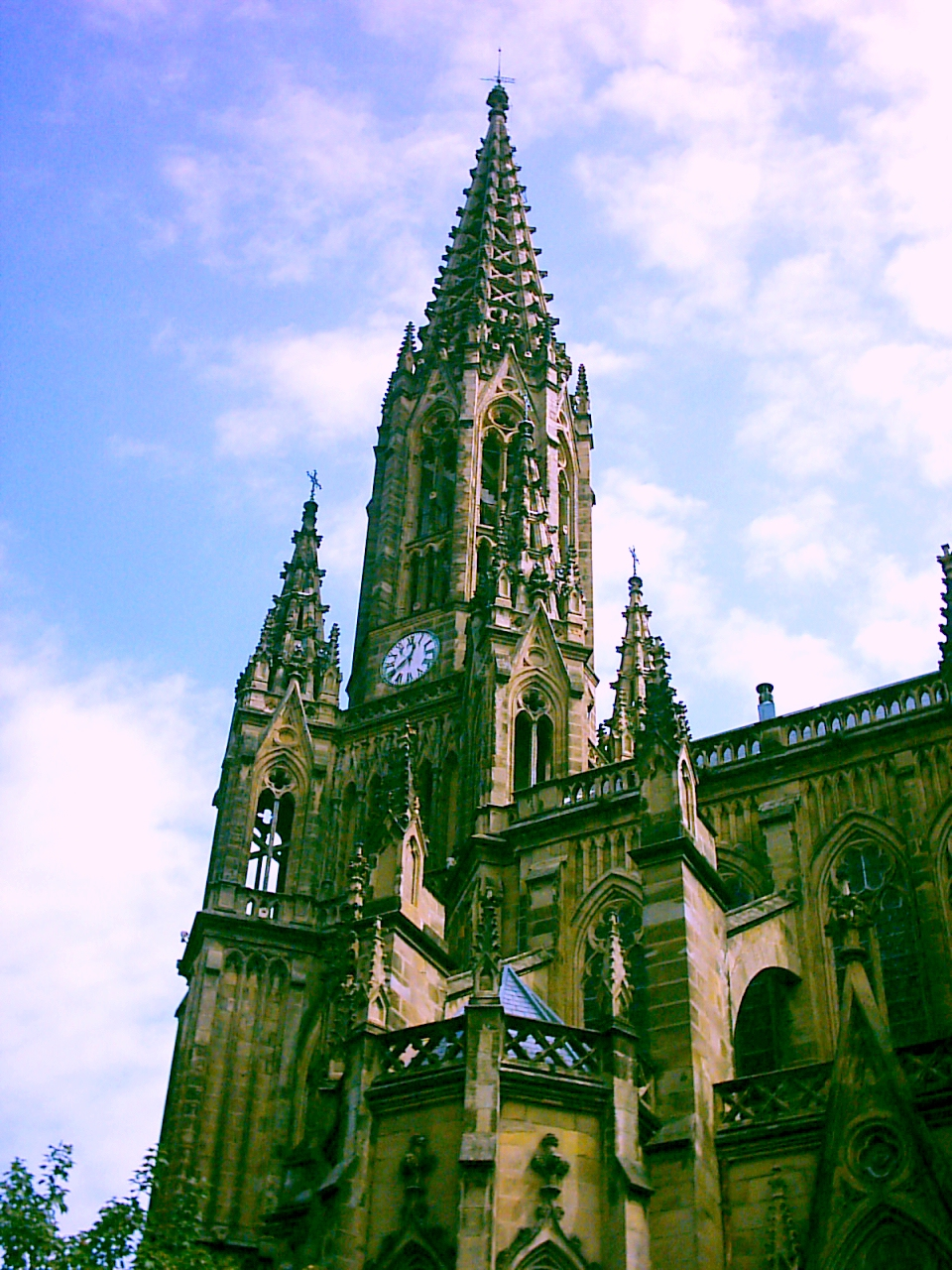
Catedral de El Buen Pastor (Cathedral of the Good Shepherd)

- Cathedral:
  - Cathedral of the Good Shepherd, San Sebastián
- Minor basilicas:
  - Basilica of Saint Ignatius of Loyola, Azpeitia
  - Basilica of Saint Mary of the Chorus, San Sebastián

== Leadership ==
- Jaime Font y Andreu (13 May 1950 – 13 Feb 1963 )
- Lorenzo Bereciartúa y Balerdi (6 Aug 1963 – 23 Oct 1968 )
- Jacinto Argaya Goicoechea (18 Nov 1968 – 16 Feb 1979 )
- José María Setién Alberro (16 Feb 1979 – 13 Jan 2000 )
- Juan María Uriarte Goiricelaya (13 Jan 2000 – 21 Nov 2009)
- José Ignacio Munilla Aguirre (21 Nov 2009 – 2022)
- Fernando Prado Ayuso (17 Dec 2022 – )

== See also ==
- Roman Catholicism in Spain
