= José Manuel Estepa Llaurens =

Spanish Roman Catholic prelate (1926–2019)

His Eminence José Manuel Estepa Llaurens
- Military Ordinary Emeritus of Spain
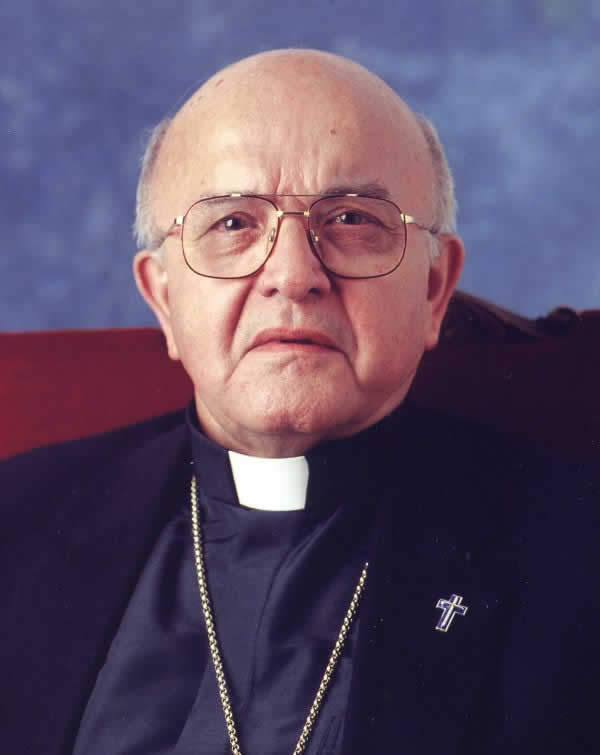
- Church: Catholic Church
- Appointed: 21 July 1986
- Term ended: 30 October 2003
- Predecessor: Emilio Benavent Escuín
- Successor: Francisco Pérez González
- Other post: Cardinal-Priest of San Gabriele Arcangelo all'Acqua Traversa (2010–2019)
- Previous posts: Titular Bishop of Tisili (1972–83); Auxiliary Bishop of Madrid (1972–83); Military Vicar of Spain (1983–86); Titular Archbishop of Velebusdus (1983–89); Titular Archbishop of Italica (1989–98)

Orders
- Ordination: 27 June 1954 by Leopoldo Eijo y Garay
- Consecration: 15 October 1972 by Vicente Enrique y Tarancón
- Created cardinal: 20 November 2010 by Pope Benedict XVI

Personal details
- Born: José Manuel Estepa Llaurens; 1 January 1926 Andújar, Spain
- Died: 21 July 2019 (aged 93) Madrid, Spain
- Education: Pontifical University of Salamanca; Pontifical Gregorian University; Institut Catholique de Paris
- Motto: Pax hominibus
- Coat of arms

Styles of José Manuel Estepa Llaurens
- Reference style: His Eminence
- Spoken style: Your Eminence
- Informal style: Cardinal

José Manuel Estepa Llaurens (1 January 1926 – 21 July 2019) was a Spanish prelate of the Catholic Church who was Military Archbishop of Spain from 1983 to 2003. He was made a cardinal in 2010.

== Biography ==
Born in Andújar, Spain, on 1 January 1926. He studied philosophy at the Pontifical University of Salamanca and theology at the Pontifical Gregorian University in Rome, where he obtained a doctorate in pastoral theology. He obtained a licentiate in pastoral catechesis at the Institut Catholique, Paris, in 1956.

He was ordained priest on 27 June 1954. He was chaplain of Colegio Mayor Universitario Guadalupe of Madrid, from 1956 until 1960. He served as professor at the Hispanicamerican Theological Seminary of Madrid from 1956 to 1964 and director of the Department of Pastoral of Obra de Cooperación Sacerdotal Hispanoamericana (OCSHA) from 1957 to 1961. He served as the assessore to the presidency of the Episcopal Council of Latin America (CELAM) from 1958 to 1967. He also collaborated with the Catholic Action. From 1965 until 1971, he was national director of catechesis of the Spanish Episcopal Conference, as well as general delegate of the Episcopal Commission for Education and consultor of the Congregation for the Clergy, 1971.

Pope Paul VI appointed him an auxiliary bishop of Madrid and titular bishop of Tisili on 5 September 1972. He was consecrated a bishop on 15 October 1972; his principal consecrator was Cardinal Vicente Enrique y Tarancón, Archbishop of Madrid.

Pope John Paul II appointed him the Ordinary of the Military Archbishopric of Spain and Titular Archbishop of Velebusdus on 30 July 1983. His titular see was changed to Titular Archbishop of Italica on 18 November 1989, but he resigned it on 7 March 1998. He retired as Military Archbishop of Spain on 30 October 2003. In the 1980s and 90s, he was a member of the Commission of six bishops that edited the Catechism of the Catholic Church and oversaw the production of its Spanish translation.

Pope Benedict XVI made him Cardinal-Priest of San Gabriele Arcangelo all'Acqua Traversa on 20 November 2010 at the age of 84.

He died on 21 July 2019 at the age of 93.

Catholic Church titles
Preceded by Emilio Benavent Escuín	Military Archbishop of Spain; 1983–2003	Succeeded by Francisco Pérez González
Preceded by Jean Margéot	Cardinal Priest of San Gabriele Arcangelo all'Acqua Traversa; 2010–2019	Succeeded by Fridolin Ambongo Besungu
