= General Vicar of the Armies =

This is a list of the General Vicar of the Armies. They are Royal Chief Chaplains whose office is to serve the Spanish Armed Forces.

The office was first established in 1644 and is usually attached with the title Patriarch of the West Indies (except for the period of 1891–1920). It only at first existed in wartime period but was permanently established in 1762. Also it was abolished during the First and Second Spanish republican era (1873–1874, 1932–1937). The pastoral care for the Spanish armed forces is now, since 1986, provided by the Military Archbishopric of Spain.

== List of General Vicar of the Armies ==
=== 1644–1937 ===
- unknown...
- Tomás Iglesias Bárcones (28 Nov 1851 Appointed - 9 May 1874 Died)
- Francisco de Paula Benavides y Navarrete (5 Jul 1875 Appointed - 13 May 1881 Appointed, Archbishop of Zaragoza)
- Miguel Payá y Rico (7 Jun 1886 Appointed - 25 Dec 1891 Died), also Archbishop of Toledo
- Jaime Cardona y Tur (11 Jul 1892 Appointed - 6 Jan 1923 Died)
- Julián de Diego y García Alcolea (27 Jul 1923 Appointed - 8 Oct 1925 Appointed, Archbishop of Santiago de Compostela)
- Francisco Muñoz e Izquierdo (14 Dec 1925 Appointed - 18 Apr 1930 Died)
- Ramón Pérez y Rodríguez (30 Jun 1930 Appointed - 28 Jan 1937 Died)

=== 1937–present ===
From this time forward (1937) the Royal Chief Chaplains are always Archbishop of Toledo...

- Isidro Gomá y Tomás (1937 Appointed - 22 Aug 1940 Died)
- Enrique Pla y Deniel (3 Oct 1941 Appointed - 5 Jul 1968 Died)
- Vicente Enrique y Tarancón (30 Jan 1969 Appointed - 3 Dec 1971 Appointed, Archbishop of Madrid)
- Marcelo González Martín (3 Dec 1971 Appointed - 23 Jun 1995 Retired)
- Francisco Alvarez Martínez (23 Jun 1995 Appointed - 24 Oct 2002 Retired)
- Antonio Cañizares Llovera (24 Oct 2002 Appointed - 9 Dec 2008 Appointed, Prefect of the Congregation for Divine Worship and the Discipline of the Sacraments)
- Braulio Rodríguez Plaza (16 Apr 2009 Appointed - )

== See also ==
- Archdiocese of Toledo
- Military Archbishopric of Spain
- Patriarch of the West Indies
- Military chaplain #Spain
- International Military Chiefs of Chaplains Conference
