= Pereda =

Pereda is a surname. Notable people with the surname include:

- Antonio de Pereda (1611–1678), Spanish Baroque-era painter, best known for his still lifes
- Chus Pereda (1938–2011), Spanish footballer who played for FC Barcelona during the 1960s
- Diego Pereda (1574–1634), Spanish Catholic prelate, Auxiliary Bishop of Toledo
- Electo Pereda, Chilean football manager
- Jhonny Pereda (born 1996), Venezuelan baseball player
- José María de Pereda (1833–1906), one of the most distinguished of modern Spanish novelists
- José Pereda (born 1973), Peruvian retired footballer
- Juan Pereda (1931–2012), former military general and de facto president of Bolivia (1978)
- Nicolás Pereda (born 1982), Mexican-Canadian film director
- Raimondo Pereda (1840–1915), Italian-Swiss sculptor
- Ramón Pereda (1897–1986), Spanish-Mexican actor and filmmaker
- Vicente Pereda (born 1941), Mexican retired footballer

== See also ==
- Pereda (Grado), one of 28 parishes (administrative divisions) in the municipality of Grado, in Asturias, northern Spain
- Pereda Palace, a building in Buenos Aires, Argentina
