= Aksyon =

Aksyon may refer to

- Aksyon (TV program), a defunct Philippine news program by TV5
- Aksyon Demokratiko, a Philippine political party
- Aksyon Ngayon, a public radio service program of DZMM
- Aksyon Radyo, a Philippine radio network owned by MBC Media Group
- AksyonTV, a defunct Philippine news channel (2011–2019)
- Avksenty (diminutive: Aksyon), a Russian male given name
