= Stefano Quaranta =

Archbishop of Amalfi

Most Reverend Stefano Quaranta C.R.
- Archbishop of Amalfi
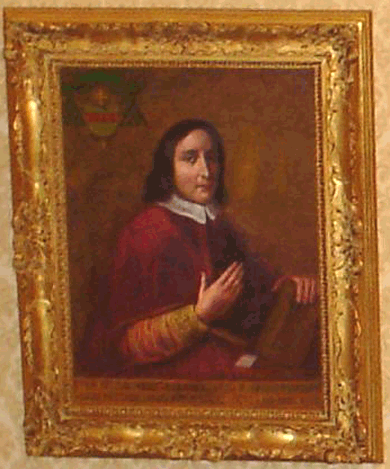
- Stefano Quaranta, Archbishop of Amalfi
- Church: Catholic Church
- Archdiocese: Archdiocese of Amalfi
- In office: 1649–1678
- Predecessor: Angelo Pichi
- Successor: Gaetano Miraballi

Orders
- Ordination: 11 October 1649 by Pope Innocent X
- Consecration: 21 November 1649 by Marcantonio Franciotti

Personal details
- Died: 30 November 1678 Naples, Italy

Archbishop Stefano Quaranta, C.R. (died 1678) was a Roman Catholic prelate who served as Archbishop of Amalfi (1649–1678).

== Biography ==
Stefano Quaranta was ordained a priest in the Congregation of Clerics Regular of the Divine Providence. On 21 November 1649, he was appointed during the papacy of Pope Innocent X as Archbishop of Amalfi. On 30 November 1678, he was consecrated bishop by Marcantonio Franciotti, Cardinal-Priest of Santa Maria della Pace, with Giovanni Battista Rinuccini. Archbishop of Fermo, and Luca Torreggiani, Archbishop of Ravenna, serving as co-consecrators. He served Archbishop of Amalfi until his death on 30 November 1678.

== Episcopal succession ==
While bishop, he was the principal co-consecrator of:

- Giovanni Montoya de Cardona, Bishop of Gallipoli (1659);
- Michelangelo Vaginari, Bishop of Giovinazzo (1659);
- Antonio Ricciulli (iuniore), Bishop of Umbriatico (1659);
- Giovanni Carlo Valentini, Bishop of Città Ducale (1659);
- Francesco de Estrada, Archbishop of Brindisi (1659);
- Attilio Pietrasanta, Bishop of Vigevano (1659); and
- Lorenzo Díaz de Encinas, Bishop of Ugento (1659).

== External links and additional sources ==
- Cheney, David M. "Archdiocese of Amalfi-Cava de' Tirreni". Catholic-Hierarchy.org. (for Chronology of Bishops) ^{[self-published]}
- Chow, Gabriel. "Archdiocese of Amalfi-Cava de' Tirreni (Italy)". GCatholic.org. (for Chronology of Bishops) ^{[self-published]}

Catholic Church titles
Preceded by Angelo Pichi	Archbishop of Amalfi; 1649–1678	Succeeded by Gaetano Miraballi
