= Chumacero =

Chumacero is a surname. Notable people with the surname include:

- Alejandro Chumacero (born 1991), Bolivian international football player
- Alí Chumacero (1918–2010), Mexican poet
- Blas Chumacero (1905–1997), Mexican trade union leader and interim secretary general of the Confederation of Mexican Workers
- Edgar Chumacero (born 1980), Mexican fencer

== See also ==
- Francisco Villagutiérrez Chumacero (1587–1652), Roman Catholic prelate who served as Auxiliary Bishop of Toledo (1646–1652)
