= Benito de Rivas =

Most Reverend Benito de Rivas
- Bishop of Puerto Rico
- Church: Catholic Church
- Diocese: Diocese of Puerto Rico
- In office: 1663–1668
- Predecessor: Juan Francisco Arnaldo Isasi
- Successor: Bartolomé Garcia de Escañuela

Orders
- Consecration: February 24, 1664 by Georges d’Aubusson de la Feuillade

Personal details
- Born: Madrid, Spain
- Died: August 21, 1668 San Juan, Puerto Rico

Benito de Rivas, O.S.B. (died August 21, 1668) was a Roman Catholic prelate who served as the Bishop of Puerto Rico (1663–1668).

== Biography ==
Benito de Rivas was born in Madrid, Spain and ordained a priest in the Order of Saint Benedict. On February 28, 1663, he was appointed by the King of Spain and confirmed by Pope Alexander VII as Bishop of Puerto Rico. On February 24, 1664, he was consecrated bishop by Georges d’Aubusson de la Feuillade, Archbishop of Embrun with Antonio del Buffalo, Auxiliary Bishop of Toledo, and Luis de Morales, Auxiliary Bishop of Toledo as Co-Consecrators. He served as Bishop of Puerto Rico until his death on August 21, 1668. While bishop, he was the principal Consecrator of Francisco de la Cueva Maldonado, Archbishop of Santo Domingo.

== External links and additional sources ==
- Cheney, David M. "Archdiocese of San Juan de Puerto Rico". Catholic-Hierarchy.org. (for Chronology of Bishops) ^{[self-published]}
- Chow, Gabriel. "Metropolitan Archdiocese of San Juan de Puerto Rico". GCatholic.org. (for Chronology of Bishops) ^{[self-published]}

Religious titles
Preceded by Juan Francisco Arnaldo Isasi	Bishop of Puerto Rico; 1663–1668	Succeeded by Bartolomé Garcia de Escañuela
