= Poreda =

Poreda is a surname. Notable people with the surname include:

- Aaron Poreda (born 1986), American baseball player
- Stanley Poreda (1909–1983), American boxer

== See also ==
- Pereda
