= Braulio Rodríguez Plaza =

Spanish Catholic prelate (born 1944)

His Excellency Braulio Rodríguez Plaza
- Metropolitan Archbishop Emeritus of Toledo; Primate Emeritus of Spain
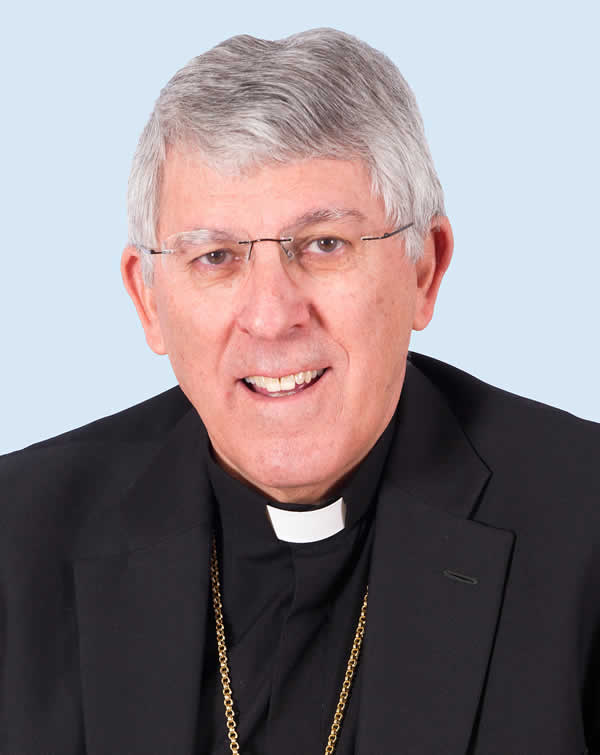
- See: Toledo
- Appointed: 16 April 2009
- Term ended: 22 February 2020
- Predecessor: Antonio Cañizares Llovera
- Successor: Francisco Cerro Chaves
- Previous posts: Bishop of Osma-Soria (1987–1995); Bishop of Salamanca (1995–2002); Metropolitan Archbishop of Valladolid (2002–2009); Metropolitan Archbishop of Toledo (2009-2019)

Orders
- Ordination: 3 April 1972 by Vicente Enrique y Tarancón
- Consecration: 20 December 1987 by Mario Tagliaferri

Personal details
- Born: Braulio Rodríguez Plaza; 27 January 1944 (age 82) Aldea del Fresno, Community of Madrid, Spanish State
- Denomination: Roman Catholic
- Coat of arms

Styles of Braulio Rodriguez Plaza
- Reference style: The Most Reverend
- Spoken style: Your Excellency
- Religious style: Archbishop

Braulio Rodríguez Plaza (27 January 1944) is a Spanish Catholic prelate, who was Metropolitan Archbishop of Toledo and Primate of Spain from 16 April 2009 to 27 December 2019. A bishop since 1987, he was Metropolitan Archbishop of Valladolid from 2002 to 2009.

== Biography ==
Rodríguez Plaza was born in Aldea del Fresno, Community of Madrid, which is now in the diocese of Getafe. He studied in the seminary in Madrid, obtaining a licentiate in theology at the Comillas Pontifical University.

He was ordained a priest on 3 April 1972 and was appointed as pastor of two rural parishes, vice parish priest in San Miguel de Carabanchel and then parish priest in San Fulgencio, a large parish in Madrid. He then became a formator at the major seminary in Madrid.

After two years in Jerusalem, he earned a degree in Sacred Scripture at the Biblical School. On 6 November 1987, Pope John Paul II appointed him Bishop of Osma-Soria. He received his episcopal consecration on 20 December 1987 from Archbishop Mario Tagliaferri.

He obtained a doctorate in Biblical Theology from the Faculty of Burgos. On 12 May 1995 he was transferred to the Diocese of Salamanca. On 28 August 2002 he was promoted to Metropolitan Archbishop of Valladolid. He received the pallium from Pope Benedict XVI on 29 June 2009.

On 16 April 2009, Pope Benedict named him Metropolitan Archbishop of Toledo, the oldest diocese in Spain, whose head is accorded the title Primate of Spain. In February 2010, Rodríguez Plaza dismissed a priest in the Toledo diocese as a result of accusations of prostitution. In January 2016, Rodríguez Plaza was misquoted as saying that women who suffered from domestic violence had often been disobedient to their husbands. Discussing the issue further in response to being misquoted, he said that domestic abuse is rooted in the lack of a real marriage, a fact he thought Spanish parties missed when trying to formulate political programs to address the problem of domestic violence.

Pope Francis accepted his resignation on 27 December 2019.

Within the Spanish Episcopal Conference, he was a member of the Standing Committee.

Catholic Church titles
Preceded by José Diéguez Reboredi	Bishop of Osma-Soria; 6 November 1987 – 12 May 1995	Succeeded by Francisco Pérez González
Preceded by Mauro Rubio Repullés	Bishop of Salamanca; 12 May 1995 – 28 August 2002	Succeeded by Carlos López Hernández
Preceded by José Delicado Baeza	Archbishop of Valladolid; 28 August 2002 – 16 April 2009	Succeeded by Ricardo Blázquez Pérez
Preceded by Antonio Cañizares Llovera	Archbishop of Toledo; 16 April 2009 – 27 December 2019	Succeeded by Francisco Cerro Chaves
