= Auxentius =

Auxentius: This name derives from the Ancient Greek “aúksēsis (αὔξησις) auksanō (αὐξάνω) auxantios (Αὐξήντιος)”, meaning “increasing, increase, growth”. This name was borne by several early saints as St. Auxentius of Bithynia. Auxentius was an Arian theologian and bishop of Milan.

Auxentius might refer to:

- Auxentius of Mopsuestia (died 360), Christian bishop and saint
- Auxentius of Milan (died 374), Arian Christian theologian and bishop
- Auxentius of Durostorum and Milan (died c. 400), Arian Christian theologian and bishop
- Auxentius of Bithynia or Saint Auxentius (died 473), hermit, and Eastern Orthodox and Roman Catholic saint
- Martyrs Eustratios, Auxentios, Eugenios, Mardarios and Orestes suffered for Christ at Sebaste in Armenia during the reign of Emperor Diocletian (284-305)

== In Other Languages ==
- Albanian: Afksént/Afksénti, Avksént/Avksénti, Auksént/Auksénti
- Armenian: Ogsen (Օգսեն)
- Belarusian: Auwksentsiy (Аўксенцій)
- Bulgarian: Avksenty (Авксентий)
- Croatian: Aksentije
- Georgian: Avksenti (ავქსენტი)
- Polish: Auksenty, Auksencjusz
- Russian: Avksenty (Авксе́нтий)
- Ukrainian: Aksentiy (Аксентій), Ovksentiy (Овксентій)

== See also ==
- Audentius (disambiguation)
- Avksenty
