= Alessio Celadoni di Celadonia =

Most Reverend Alessio Celadoni di Celadonia
- Bishop of Molfetta
- Church: Catholic Church
- Diocese: Diocese of Molfetta
- In office: 1508–1517
- Predecessor: Angelo Lacerti
- Successor: Ferdinando Ponzetti
- Previous post: Bishop of Gallipoli (1494–1508)

Personal details
- Died: 1517 Molfetta, Italy

Alessio Celadoni di Celadonia (died 1517) was a Roman Catholic prelate who served as Bishop of Molfetta (1508–1517) and Bishop of Gallipoli (1494–1508).

== Biography ==
In 1494, Alessio Celadoni di Celadonia was appointed during the papacy of Pope Alexander VI as Bishop of Gallipoli. On 7 June 1508, he was transferred by Pope Julius II to the diocese of Molfetta. He served as Bishop of Molfetta until his death in 1517.

== External links and additional sources ==
- Cheney, David M. "Diocese of Gallipoli". Catholic-Hierarchy.org. (for Chronology of Bishops) ^{[self-published]}
- Chow, Gabriel. "Diocese of Gallipoli (Italy)". GCatholic.org. (for Chronology of Bishops) ^{[self-published]}
- Cheney, David M. "Diocese of Molfetta-Ruvo-Giovinazzo-Terlizzi". Catholic-Hierarchy.org. (for Chronology of Bishops) ^{[self-published]}
- Chow, Gabriel. "Diocese of Molfetta-Ruvo-Giovinazzo-Terlizzi (Italy)". GCatholic.org. (for Chronology of Bishops) ^{[self-published]}

Catholic Church titles
Preceded by	Bishop of Gallipoli; 1494–1508	Succeeded by Enrique de Aragón (bishop)
Preceded by Angelo Lacerti	Bishop of Molfetta; 1508–1517	Succeeded by Ferdinando Ponzetti
