= Andrea Massa (bishop) =

17th-century Roman Catholic bishop

Most Reverend Andrea Massa
- Bishop of Gallipoli
- Church: Catholic Church
- Diocese: Diocese of Gallipoli
- In office: 1651–1654
- Predecessor: Gonzalo de Rueda
- Successor: Giovanni Montoya de Cardona

Orders
- Consecration: 8 Oct 1645 by Giovanni Giacomo Panciroli

Personal details
- Born: 6 Jun 1607 Melfi, Italy
- Died: 30 Dec 1654 (age 47)

Andrea Massa (1607–1654) was a Roman Catholic prelate who served as Bishop of Gallipoli (1651–1654) and Bishop of Castellammare di Stabia (1645–1654).

== Biography ==
Andrea Massa was born in Melfi, Italy on 6 Jun 1607. On 18 Sep 1645, he was appointed during the papacy of Pope Innocent X as Bishop of Castellammare di Stabia. On 8 Oct 1645, he was consecrated bishop by Giovanni Giacomo Panciroli, Cardinal-Priest of Santo Stefano al Monte Celio, with Alfonso Gonzaga, Titular Archbishop of Rhodus and Ranuccio Scotti Douglas, Bishop of Borgo San Donnino, serving as co-consecrators. On 25 Sep 1651, he was appointed during the papacy of Pope Innocent X as Bishop of Gallipoli. He served as Bishop of Gallipoli until his death on 30 Dec 1654.

== External links and additional sources ==
- Cheney, David M. "Diocese of Castellammare di Stabia". Catholic-Hierarchy.org. (for Chronology of Bishops) ^{[self-published]}
- Chow, Gabriel. "Diocese of Castellammare di Stabia (Italy)". GCatholic.org. (for Chronology of Bishops) ^{[self-published]}
- Cheney, David M. "Diocese of Gallipoli". Catholic-Hierarchy.org. (for Chronology of Bishops) ^{[self-published]}
- Chow, Gabriel. "Diocese of Gallipoli (Italy)". GCatholic.org. (for Chronology of Bishops) ^{[self-published]}

Catholic Church titles
Preceded by Annibale Mascambruno	Bishop of Castellammare di Stabia; 1645–1654	Succeeded by Clemente Del Pezzo
Preceded by Gonzalo de Rueda	Bishop of Gallipoli; 1651–1654	Succeeded by Giovanni Montoya de Cardona
