= Pedro Oriona =

Roman Catholic bishop

Most Reverend Pedro Oriona
- Auxiliary Bishop of Toledo
- Church: Catholic Church
- Archdiocese: Archdiocese of Toledo
- In office: 1549–1560

Personal details
- Died: 1560 Toledo, Spain

Pedro Oriona (died 1560) was a Roman Catholic prelate who served as Auxiliary Bishop of Toledo (1549–1560).

== Biography ==
Pedro Oriona was ordained a friar in the Order of the Blessed Virgin Mary of Mercy. On 18 Jan 1549, he was appointed during the papacy of Pope Paul III as Auxiliary Bishop of Toledo and Titular Bishop of Columbica. He served as Auxiliary Bishop of Toledo until his death in 1560.
