= San Gabriele Arcangelo all'Acqua Traversa =

- Church of Saint Gabriel the Archangel at Acque Traversa (in English); Sancti Gabrieli Archangeli ad Aquam Transversam (in Latin)
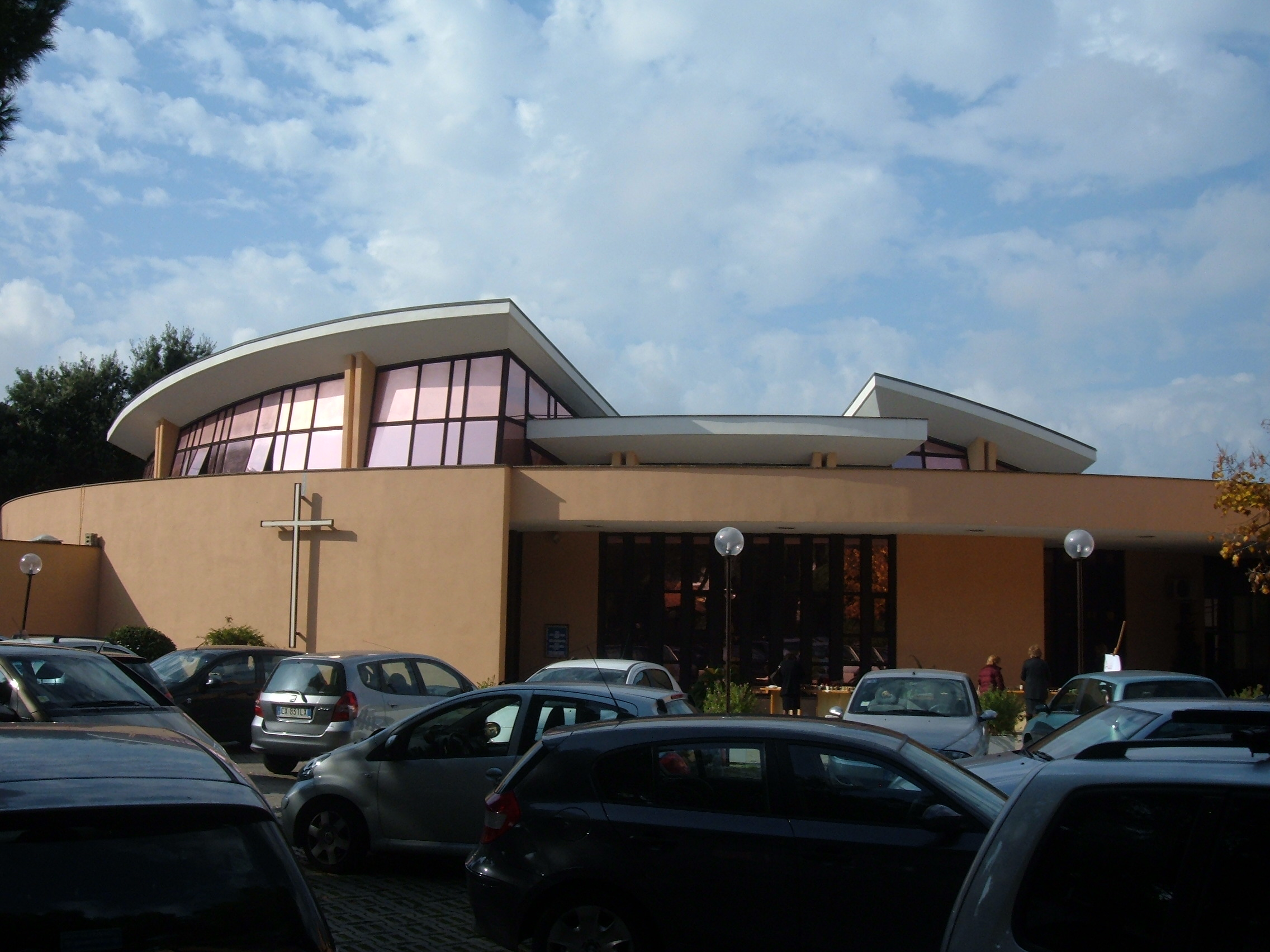
- Facade
- Click on the map for a fullscreen view
- 41°57′01″N 12°26′36″E
- Location: Viale Cortina d'Ampezzo 144, Rome
- Country: Italy
- Denomination: Roman Catholic
- Tradition: Roman Rite

History
- Status: Titular church
- Dedication: Gabriel the Archangel
- Consecrated: 1958

Architecture
- Architect: Vera Puoti
- Architectural type: Church
- Style: Modernist

Administration
- District: Lazio
- Province: Rome

St. Gabriel the Archangel is one of the churches of Rome, located in the suburbs Della Vittoria, Viale Cortina d'Ampezzo.

== History ==
It was built in the twentieth century. The church is home to the parish, which was established August 30, 1956 by Clemente Micara Cardinal Vicar with the decree Neminem fugit, and entrusted, since 1958, the priests of the Society of Divine Vocations (called vocation promoters).

== List of Cardinal Protectors ==
It also is home to the cardinal's title of Saint Gabriel the Archangel Acqua Travers, instituted by Pope John Paul II on 28 June 1988.

- Jean Margeot (28 June 1988 - 17 July 2009)
- José Manuel Estepa Llaurens (20 November 2010 – 21 July 2019)
- Fridolin Ambongo Besungu (5 October 2019 – present)
