= Francisco Cerro Chaves =

Spanish archbishop

The Most Reverend Francisco Cerro Chaves
- Metropolitan Archbishop of Toledo; Primate of Spain
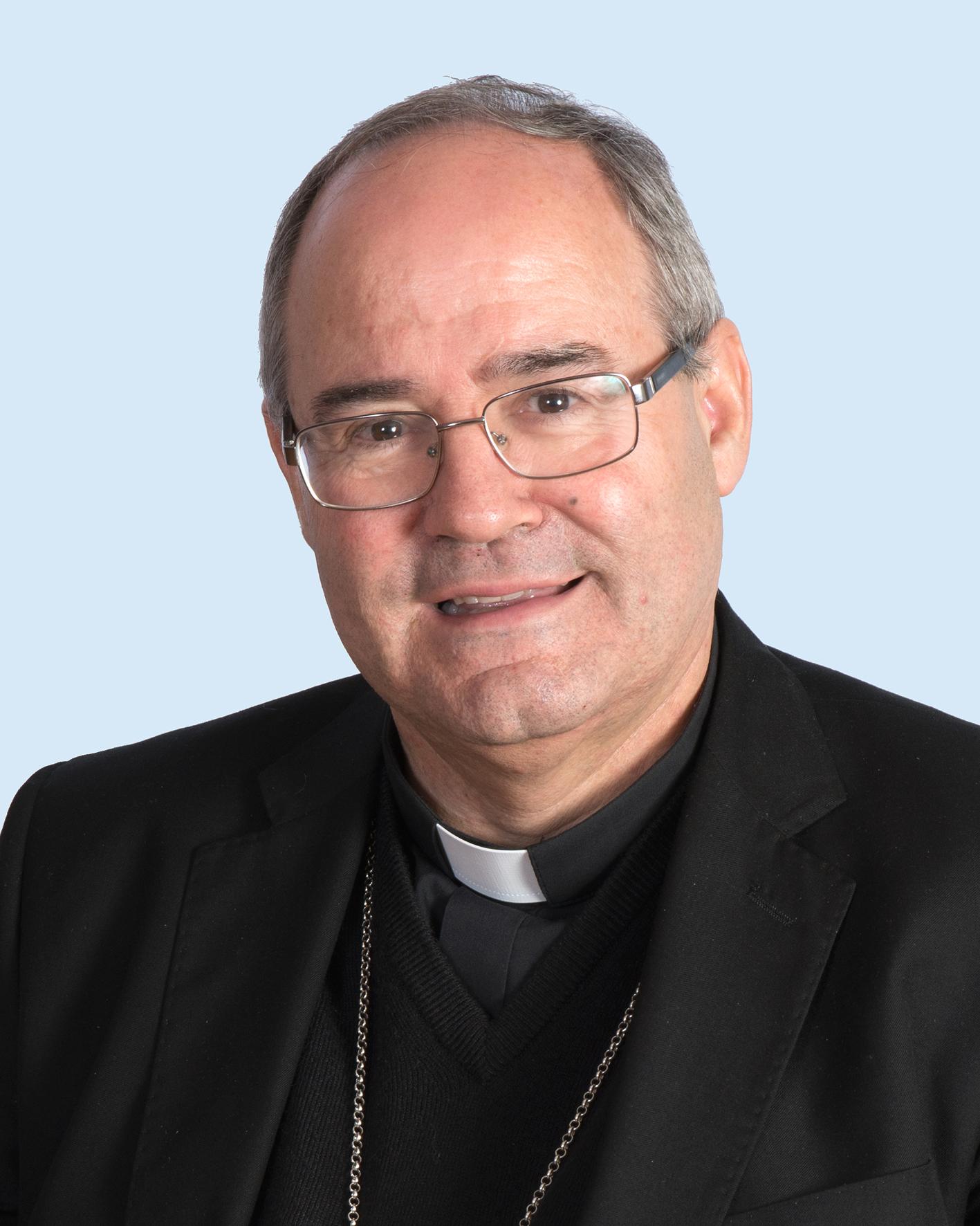
- Church: Roman Catholic
- Archdiocese: Toledo
- Installed: 29 February 2020
- Predecessor: Braulio Rodriguez Plaza
- Previous post: Bishop of Coria-Caceres (2010–2020)

Orders
- Ordination: 12 July 1981
- Consecration: 2 September 2007 by Manuel Monteiro de Castro

Personal details
- Born: 18 October 1957 (age 68) Caceres, Spanish State
- Education: Pontifical Gregorian University; Pontifical University of Salamanca
- Motto: Cor Jesu Fons Evangelisationis Pauperibus
- Coat of arms

Francisco Cerro Chaves (born 18 October 1957) is a Spanish prelate, theologian, and philosopher of the Catholic Church who has been Metropolitan Archbishop of Toledo since February 2020. He has been a bishop since 2007 and was Bishop of Coria-Caceres from 2007 to 2019.

== Biography ==
He was born on 18 October 1957 in Malpartida di Cáceres. He studied philosophy there and then earned his bachelor's degree in theology at the seminary of Toledo. At the Pontifical Gregorian University he earned his licentiate and then his doctorate in spiritual theology in 1997.

He was ordained a priest of the Archdiocese of Toledo on 12 July 1981. He became vicar of San Nicolás parish that year and was then assistant for youth from 1982 to 1989, assistant at Santa Teresa parish in 1986–1987, and director of the diocesan house for spiritual exercises from 1986 to 1989. In 1989 he transferred to Valladolid, where he was incardinated in 1992. There he was director of the Center for Formation and Spirituality of the Sacred Heart of Jesus and chaplain of the National Sanctuary of the Great Promise from 1989 to 2007.

On the 21 June 2007, Pope Benedict XVI named him bishop of Coria-Cáceres. He received his episcopal consecration on 12 September.

In the Spanish Bishops Conference, he was a member of the commission for consecrated life from 2007 to 2017 and the commission for the laity from 2008 to 2011. He became a member in 2017 of the commissions for the missions, interchurch cooperation, and the clergy.

Pope Francis appointed him Metropolitan Archbishop of Toledo on 27 December 2019.
