= Juan Damián López de Haro =

Bishop of Puerto Rico

His Excellency, The Most Reverend Damián Lopez Prattes OSST
- Bishop of Puerto
- Church: Catholic Church
- Diocese: Diocese of Puerto Rico
- Predecessor: Juan Alonso de Solis y Mendoza
- Successor: Hernando de Lobo Castrillo

Orders
- Consecration: February 14, 1644 by García Gil Manrique

Personal details
- Born: September 27, 1581 Toledo, Spain
- Died: August 24, 1648 (age 66) San Juan, Puerto Rico

Arms of the House of Haro.

Juan Damián López de Haro y Villarda, O.SS.T. (September 27, 1581 – August 24, 1648) was a Spanish Catholic prelate who served as Bishop of Puerto Rico from 1643 to 1648. He was member of the House of Haro and the Order of the Most Holy Trinity. He is known for expressing his disillusionment concerning Puerto Rico's dilapidated colony status, and for his poems written to Spanish officials.

== Early years ==
López de Haro was born in Toledo, Spain on September 27, 1581, where he was baptized on the same day. He enrolled in Religious studies in 1599, majoring in philosophy at the convent in Toledo. He later majored in Theology continuing his studies in Salamanca.

== Bishop of Puerto Rico ==
López de Haro was appointed Bishop of Puerto Rico on February 9, 1643, confirmed on June 13, ordained as bishop by García Gil Manrique, Bishop of Barcelona on February 14, 1644, and installed upon his arrival to Puerto Rico on July 13, 1644. Upon his arrival, López de Haro began to express his overall dislike with the conditions of the Colony of Puerto Rico at that time and convened a Synod.

In his final years as Bishop, López de Haro began visiting annexed regions of the diocese in what is now Venezuela. He found that the churches were extremely poor. He considered that the church was not getting the proper share of tithes, and directed that they should be paid in the cathedral to avoid abuses. Gregorio de Castellar y Mantilla, Governor and Captain-General of Cumaná, and Francisco de Santillán y Argote, Governor of Isla Margarita, joined in opposing the decision, which they saw as a violation of the currently accepted property rights, and wanted to continue to collect tithes. Don Damian died in Margarita on 20 September 1648 after a ship carrying plague arrived from Puerto Rico. Two hundred other people died, according to Santillan's report to the court.

== Literature ==
During his tenure, López de Haro wrote extensively maintaining correspondence with numerous dignitaries. Of the most notable are King Philip IV, and Juan Diez de la Calle, a clerk of the secretary of New Spain of the Council of the Indies (in Madrid). In his letters to King Philip were descriptions of the state of the diocese on both the Island of Puerto Rico, City of San Juan Bautista, and annexes.

In his letters to Juan Dias de la Calle, López de Haro is seen expressing his dissatisfaction with colonial conditions of Puerto Rico, and his distaste of white settlers' chivalrous hypocrisy.

López de Haro has also written some of the first recordings of Taíno folk tales and his writings are the only known historical description of Puerto Rico in the mid-seventeenth century.

== See also ==
- Roman Catholic Archdiocese of San Juan de Puerto Rico
- Puerto Rican literature
- List of Latin American writers

== External links and additional sources ==
- Cheney, David M. "Archdiocese of San Juan de Puerto Rico". Catholic-Hierarchy.org. (for Chronology of Bishops) ^{[self-published]}
- Chow, Gabriel. "Metropolitan Archdiocese of San Juan de Puerto Rico". GCatholic.org. (for Chronology of Bishops) ^{[self-published]}
- Medrano Herrero, Pío (2004). "RETRATO ESPIRITUAL DE DAMIÁN LÓPEZ DE HARO EN LOS CUATRO ÚLTIMOS AÑOS DE SU VIDA". Universidad Interamericana Puerto Rico. Archived from the original on 2016-03-03.

Religious titles
Preceded by Juan Alonso de Solis y Mendoza	Bishop of Puerto Rico; 1643–1648	Succeeded by Hernando de Lobo Castrillo
