= Audentius =

Audentius, meaning bold or courageous in Latin, may refer to:

- Audentius, Bishop of Toledo in 385–395 and possible author of De fide adversus haereticos.
- Audentius, bishop of Die (Gaul) in the 5th century, who carried the title of bishop of the Vocontii
