= Melantius (bishop of Toledo) =

Romano-Hispanic Bishop

Melantius (Spanish: ''Melancio''; died c. 324) was a Romano-Hispanic Bishop of Toledo from the end of the 3rd Century to the beginning of the 4th century, whose name only appears in the minutes of the Synod of Elvira in contemporary sources.

== Biography ==
Melantius was the bishop of Toledo during the Synod of Elvira, which occurred sometime between 300-324. Because of this, he does not appear in the some episcopal lists like the one from the Glosas Emilianenses. J.F. Rivera believed that he was Pelagius, the first bishop to appear in the Glosas. Conversely, Enrique Flórez believes that Melantius is the evidence that Pelagius may have had other predecessors, he also based this on his belief in the legendary St. Eugenius the Martyr who is often listed at the first bishop of Toledo. Flórez indicates that Melantius must have been bishop for a number of years and was consecrated towards the end of the 3rd Century (the inscriptions in the acts suggest that Melantius was old in comparison to the other bishops) in a troublesome period, during the Diocletianic Persecution and the martyrdom of St. Leocadia, which caused the omission in the Glosas were written much later under the Visigothic Kingdom.

== Bibliography ==
- Flórez, Enrique (1859). España sagrada. Vol. V. Madrid: J. Rodríguez.
- Vilella Masana, Josep (2003). "Los obispos toledanos anteriores al Reino visigodo-católico". Acta Antiqua Complutensia III: Santos, obispos y reliquias (PDF). Alcalá de Henares: Universidad de Alcalá de Henares. ISBN 84-8138-573-5.

Predecessor: Eugene of Toledo (possibly legendary)	Archbishop of Toledo before 305–324	Successor: Pelagius/ Patruinus (disputed)
