= Antonio del Buffalo =

Most Reverend Antonio del Buffalo
- Bishop of Gallipoli
- Church: Catholic Church
- Diocese: Diocese of Gallipoli
- In office: 1668–1677
- Predecessor: Giovanni Montoja de Cardona
- Successor: Antonio Pérez de la Lastra
- Previous posts: Auxiliary Bishop of Toledo (1661–1666); Auxiliary Bishop of Sigüenza (1666–1668)

Orders
- Consecration: 19 February 1662 by Georges d'Aubusson de la Feuillade

Personal details
- Born: 1619 Vallata, Italy
- Died: 25 September 1677 (aged 57–58) Gallipoli, Apulia, Italy

Antonio del Buffalo, O.F.M. or Antonio Geremia de Bufalo (1619–1677) was a Roman Catholic prelate who served as Bishop of Gallipoli (1668–1677), Auxiliary Bishop of Sigüenza (1666–1668), and Auxiliary Bishop of Toledo (1661–1666).

== Biography ==
Antonio del Buffalo was born in Vallata, Italy in 1619 and ordained a priest in the Order of Friars Minor. On 5 March 1660, he was selected by the King of Spain and confirmed on 8 August 1661 by Pope Alexander VII as Auxiliary Bishop of Toledo and Titular Bishop of Temnus. On 19 February 1662, he was consecrated bishop by Georges d'Aubusson de la Feuillade, Archbishop of Embrun, with Luis de Morales (bishop), Titular Bishop of Troas, and Miguel Pérez Cevallos, Titular Bishop of Arcadiopolis in Asia, serving as co-consecrators. In 1666, he was appointed during the papacy of Pope Alexander VII as Auxiliary Bishop of Sigüenza. On 14 May 1668, he was appointed during the papacy of Pope Clement IX as Bishop of Gallipoli. He served as Bishop of Gallipoli until his death on 25 September 1677.

== Episcopal succession ==
While bishop, he was the principal consecrator of:

- Antonio Rodríguez Castañon, Bishop of Ciudad Rodrigo (1662);

and the principal co-consecrator of:

- Dionisio Pérez Escobosa, Bishop of Mondoñedo (1663);
- Lorenzo de Sotomayor, Bishop of Zamora (1663);
- Francisco Rodríguez Castañón, Bishop of Orense (1664);
- Benito de Rivas, Bishop of Puerto Rico (1664);
- Alfonso Vázquez de Toledo, Bishop of Cádiz (1664); and
- Ambrosio Ignacio Spínola y Guzmán, Bishop of Oviedo (1665).

== External links and additional sources ==
- Cheney, David M. "Diocese of Gallipoli". Catholic-Hierarchy.org. (for Chronology of Bishops) ^{[self-published]}
- Chow, Gabriel. "Diocese of Gallipoli (Italy)". GCatholic.org. (for Chronology of Bishops) ^{[self-published]}

Catholic Church titles
Preceded by	Auxiliary Bishop of Toledo; 1661–1666	Succeeded by
Preceded by	Auxiliary Bishop of Sigüenza; 1666–1668	Succeeded by
Preceded by Giovanni Montoja de Cardona	Bishop of Gallipoli; 1668–1677	Succeeded by Antonio Pérez de la Lastra
