= Julián Alvear =

Spanish Roman Catholic prelate

Most Reverend Julián Alvear
- Auxiliary Bishop of Toledo
- Church: Catholic Church
- Archdiocese: Archdiocese of Toledo
- In office: 1631

Julián Alvear or Julián Alvera was a Roman Catholic prelate who served as Auxiliary Bishop of Toledo (1631).

== Biography ==
In 1631, Julián Alvear was appointed during the papacy of Pope Urban VIII as Auxiliary Bishop of Toledo and Titular Bishop of Siriensis. While bishop, he was the principal co-consecrator of Domingo Pimentel Zúñiga, Bishop of Osma (1631).

== See also ==
- Catholic Church in Spain
