= Luis de Morales (bishop) =

Roman Catholic prelate

Most Reverend Luis de Morales
- Auxiliary Bishop of Toledo; Titular Bishop of Troas
- Church: Catholic Church
- Archdiocese: Archdiocese of Toledo
- In office: 1661–1679

Personal details
- Born: 1618 Belmonte, Spain
- Died: 1679 (age 61) Toledo, Spain

Luis de Morales (1618–1679) was a Roman Catholic prelate who served as the Auxiliary Bishop of Toledo (1661–1679).

De Morales was born in Belmonte, Spain, in 1618 and ordained a priest in the Order of Saint Augustine. On 5 September 1661, he was appointed during the papacy of Pope Alexander VII as the Auxiliary Bishop of Toledo and the Titular Bishop of Troas. He served as the Auxiliary Bishop of Toledo until his death in 1679.He was 61 years old.

== Episcopal succession ==
Episcopal succession of Luis de Morales

While bishop, he was the principal consecrator of:

- Antonio del Buffalo, Auxiliary Bishop of Toledo (1662);
- Antonio Rodríguez Castañon, Bishop of Ciudad Rodrigo (1662);
- Francisco de Seijas Losada, Bishop of Valladolid (1664);
- Francisco Rodríguez Castañón, Bishop of Orense (1664);
- Benito de Rivas, Bishop of Puerto Rico (1664);
- Alfonso Vázquez de Toledo, Bishop of Cádiz (1664); and
- Diego Ros de Medrano, Bishop of Orense (1673).
