= Juan Francisco Arnaldo Isasi =

Most Reverend Juan Francisco Arnaldo Isasi
- Bishop of Puerto Rico
- Church: Catholic Church
- Diocese: Diocese of Puerto Rico
- In office: 1656–1661
- Predecessor: Francisco Naranjo
- Successor: Benito de Rivas

Personal details
- Born: Jamaica
- Died: April 4, 1661 San Juan, Puerto Rico

Juan Francisco Arnaldo Isasi (died 1655) was a Roman Catholic prelate who served as Bishop of Puerto Rico (1656–1661).

== Biography ==
Juan Francisco Arnaldo Isasi was born in Jamaica. On May 29, 1656, he was appointed by the King of Spain and confirmed by Pope Alexander VII as Bishop of Puerto Rico. He served as Bishop of Puerto Rico until his death on April 4, 1661.

== External links and additional sources ==
- Cheney, David M. "Archdiocese of San Juan de Puerto Rico". Catholic-Hierarchy.org. (for Chronology of Bishops) ^{[self-published]}
- Chow, Gabriel. "Metropolitan Archdiocese of San Juan de Puerto Rico". GCatholic.org. (for Chronology of Bishops) ^{[self-published]}

Religious titles
Preceded by Francisco Naranjo	Bishop of Puerto Rico; 1656–1661	Succeeded by Benito de Rivas
