= García Gil Manrique =

Roman Catholic Priest

Most Reverend García Gil Manrique
- Bishop of Barcelona
- Church: Catholic Church
- Diocese: Diocese of Barcelona
- In office: 1633–1655
- Predecessor: Juan Sentís
- Successor: Ramón Sentmenat y Lanuza
- Previous posts: Auxiliary Bishop of Cuenca (1618–1627); Bishop of Gerona (1627–1633)

Orders
- Consecration: 29 April 1618 by Giovanni Garzia Mellini

Personal details
- Born: 1575
- Died: 1655 (aged 79–80) Barcelona, Spain

García Gil Manrique (died 1655) was a Roman Catholic prelate who served as Bishop of Barcelona (1633–1655), Bishop of Gerona (1627–1633), and Auxiliary Bishop of Cuenca (1618–1627).

== Biography ==
On 5 March 1618, García Gil Manrique was appointed during the papacy of Pope Paul V as Auxiliary Bishop of Cuenca and Titular Bishop of Utica. On 29 April 1618, he was consecrated bishop by Giovanni Garzia Mellini, Cardinal-Priest of Santi Quattro Coronati with Francesco Sacrati (cardinal), Titular Archbishop of Damascus, and Cesare Ventimiglia, Bishop of Terracina, Priverno e Sezze, serving as co-consecrators. On 30 August 1627, he was appointed during the papacy of Pope Urban VIII as Bishop of Gerona. On 28 November 1633, he was appointed during the papacy of Pope Urban VIII as Bishop of Barcelona. He served as Bishop of Barcelona until his death in 1655.

On a political level, King Felipe IV named him Viceroy of Catalonia on 29 July 1640, after the two previous viceroys had been murdered on 7 June and 22 July, during the Catalan Revolt. When the President of the Generalitat de Catalunya started negotiations with France to hand over the principality to create an independent Catalan Republic under a French protectorate, Gil Manrique tried in vain to change his mind. The Spanish King reacted by sending troops to Catalonia and ordered Gil Manrique to use force against the rebels. But Gil Manrique refused, and was dismissed and replaced by the Marquis de los Vélez. The Generalitat did not accept the new viceroy and fighting broke out in December 1640. Gil Manrique fell seriously ill and was expelled from Catalonia in October 1642. He returned to El Pobo de Dueñas where he spent the rest of his life.

== Episcopal succession ==
While bishop, he was the principal consecrator of:

- Ramón Sentmenat y Lanuza, Bishop of Vic (1640);
- Damián Lopez de Haro y Villarda, Bishop of Puerto Rico (1644);

and the principal co-consecrator of:

- Juan de la Torre Ayala, Bishop of Orense (1622);
- Fernando Valdés Llano, Bishop of Teruel (1625);
- Miguel Ayala, Bishop of Palencia (1625);
- Gutiérrez Bernardo de Quirós (Quiróz), Bishop of Tlaxcala (1626);
- Baltasar Borja, Bishop of Mallorca (1626);
- Sebastião de Matos de Noronha, Bishop of Elvas (1626); and
- Juan Pereda Gudiel, Bishop of Oviedo (1627).

== External links and additional sources ==
- Cheney, David M. "Diocese of Cuenca". Catholic-Hierarchy.org. (for Chronology of Bishops) ^{[self-published]}
- Chow, Gabriel. "Diocese of Cuenca (Spain)". GCatholic.org. (for Chronology of Bishops) ^{[self-published]}

Catholic Church titles
Preceded by	Auxiliary Bishop of Cuenca; 1618–1627	Succeeded by
Preceded by Francisco Ugarte (bishop)	Titular Bishop of Utica; 1618–1627	Succeeded by Alonso Godina
Preceded by Francesc Senjust	Bishop of Gerona; 1627–1633	Succeeded by Gregorio Parcero de Castro
Preceded by Juan Sentís	Bishop of Barcelona; 1633–1655	Succeeded by Ramón Sentmenat y Lanuza
