= Hernando de Lobo Castrillo =

17th century Bishop of Puerto Rico

Most Reverend Hernando de Lobo Castrillo
- Bishop of Puerto Rico
- Church: Catholic Church
- Archdiocese: Archdiocese of Santo Domingo
- In office: 1649–1651
- Predecessor: Damián Lopez de Haro y Villarda
- Successor: Francisco Naranjo

Orders
- Consecration: July 26, 1650 by Mauro Diego de Tovar y Valle Maldonado

Personal details
- Born: 1590 Navarrete, Spain
- Died: October 17, 1651 (age 61) San Juan, Puerto Rico

Hernando de Lobo Castrillo, O. Carm. (1590 – October 17, 1651) was a Roman Catholic prelate who served as the Bishop of Puerto Rico (1649–1651).

== Biography ==
Hernando de Lobo Castrillo was born in Navarrete, Spain and ordained a priest in the Order of Carmelites. On December 9, 1649, he was appointed by the King of Spain and confirmed by Pope Innocent X as Bishop of Puerto Rico. On July 26, 1650, he was consecrated bishop by Mauro Diego de Tovar y Valle Maldonado, Bishop of Caracas. He served as Bishop of Puerto Rico until his death on October 17, 1651.

== External links and additional sources ==
- Cheney, David M. "Archdiocese of San Juan de Puerto Rico". Catholic-Hierarchy.org. (for Chronology of Bishops) ^{[self-published]}
- Chow, Gabriel. "Metropolitan Archdiocese of San Juan de Puerto Rico". GCatholic.org. (for Chronology of Bishops) ^{[self-published]}

Religious titles
Preceded by Damián Lopez de Haro y Villarda	Bishop of Puerto Rico; 1649–1651	Succeeded by Francisco Naranjo
