= Ángel Suquía Goicoechea =

Catholic cardinal and Archbishop of Madrid

His Eminence Ángel Suquía Goicoechea
- Cardinal; Archbishop of Madrid
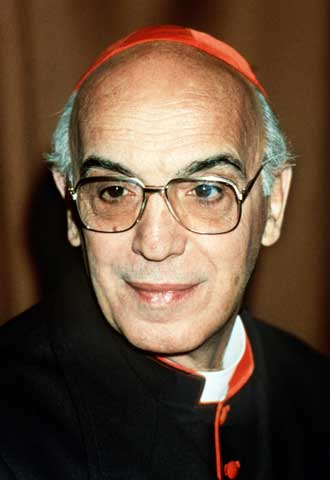
- Church: Roman Catholic Church
- Archdiocese: Madrid
- See: Madrid
- Predecessor: Vicente Enrique y Tarancón
- Successor: Antonio María Rouco Varela

Orders
- Created cardinal: 25 May 1985 by Pope John Paul II

Personal details
- Born: Ángel Suquía Goicoechea; 2 October 1916 Zaldibia, Spain
- Died: 13 July 2006 (aged 89) San Sebastián, Spain
- Buried: Catedral de la Almudena
- Denomination: Catholic (Roman Rite)
- Coat of arms: Ángel Suquía Goicoechea's coat of arms

Styles of Ángel Suquía Goicoechea
- Reference style: His Eminence
- Spoken style: Your Eminence
- Informal style: Cardinal
- See: Madrid

Ángel Suquía Goicoechea (2 October 1916 – 13 July 2006) was a Spanish Catholic cardinal who served as archbishop of Madrid from 1983 until 1994.

== Education ==
He was one of sixteen children and was educated at the La Salle Christian Brothers at Beasain from 1925 until 1927; he then entered the Minor Seminary of Saturrarán, Motrico, Guipúzcoa, where he studied Humanities, Philosophy and Theology. He remained there until 1931, whereupon he entered the Major Seminary of Vitoria, until 1936. When the Spanish Civil War started in 1936, he was destined to the fort of Guadalupe as a soldiers' instructor. In 1939, he travelled to the Benedictine monastery of Maria Laach in Germany, to study liturgy but when the Second World War started in that same year, he quickly returned to Spain. He was ordained to the priesthood on 7 July 1940.

He entered the Pontifical Gregorian University in Rome in 1946 remaining there until 1949 where he obtained a doctorate in theology with the highest grades with his thesis on La santa Misa en la espiritualidad de San Ignacio de Loyola.

== Career ==
On 17 May 1966 Pope Paul VI appointed him to be the Bishop of Almería. He served as bishop of Málaga from 1969 to 1973. He became Archbishop of Santiago de Compostela on 13 April 1973. On 12 April 1983 he was chosen to succeed Cardinal Vicente Enrique y Tarancón as Archbishop of Madrid by Pope John Paul II.

On 25 May 1985 he was created Cardinal-Priest of Gran Madre di Dio. He remained at the see of Madrid until 1994 when he reached the age of 77. He is buried in Almudena Cathedral.

== Other works ==
He was President of the Spanish Episcopal Conference from 1987 to 1993, as well as serving as Grand Chancellor of the Pontifical University of Salamanca. He was also elected a full member of the Royal Academy of History.

He was also an author, with his writings including Seguir a Cristo Hoy ("Follow Christ Today") and Constituciones, decretos, declaraciones ("Constitutions, decrees, declarations"). His writings were published in five volumes in 1994.

== Gallery ==
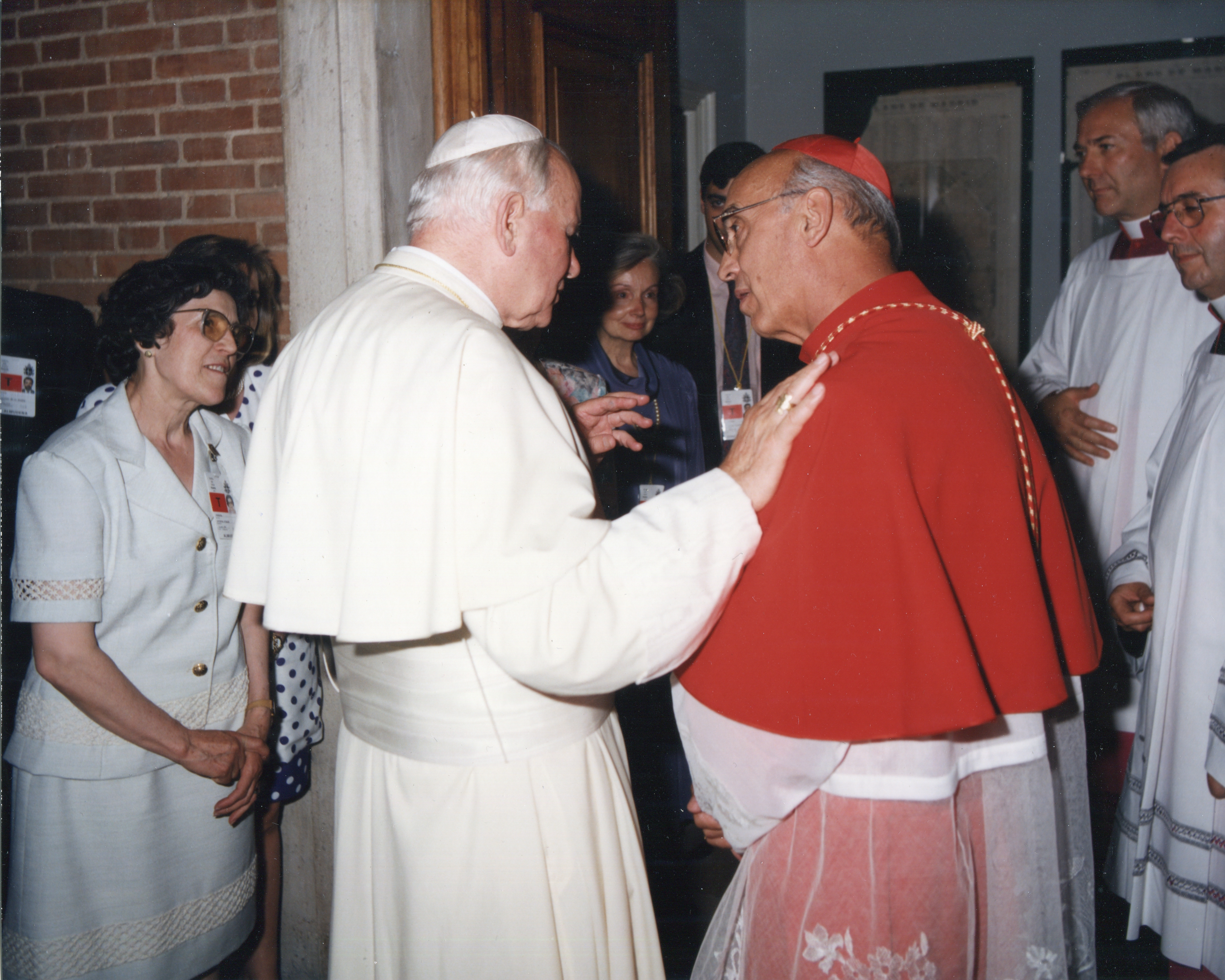
Ángel Suquía and Pope John Paul II in the consecration of the Almudena Cathedral

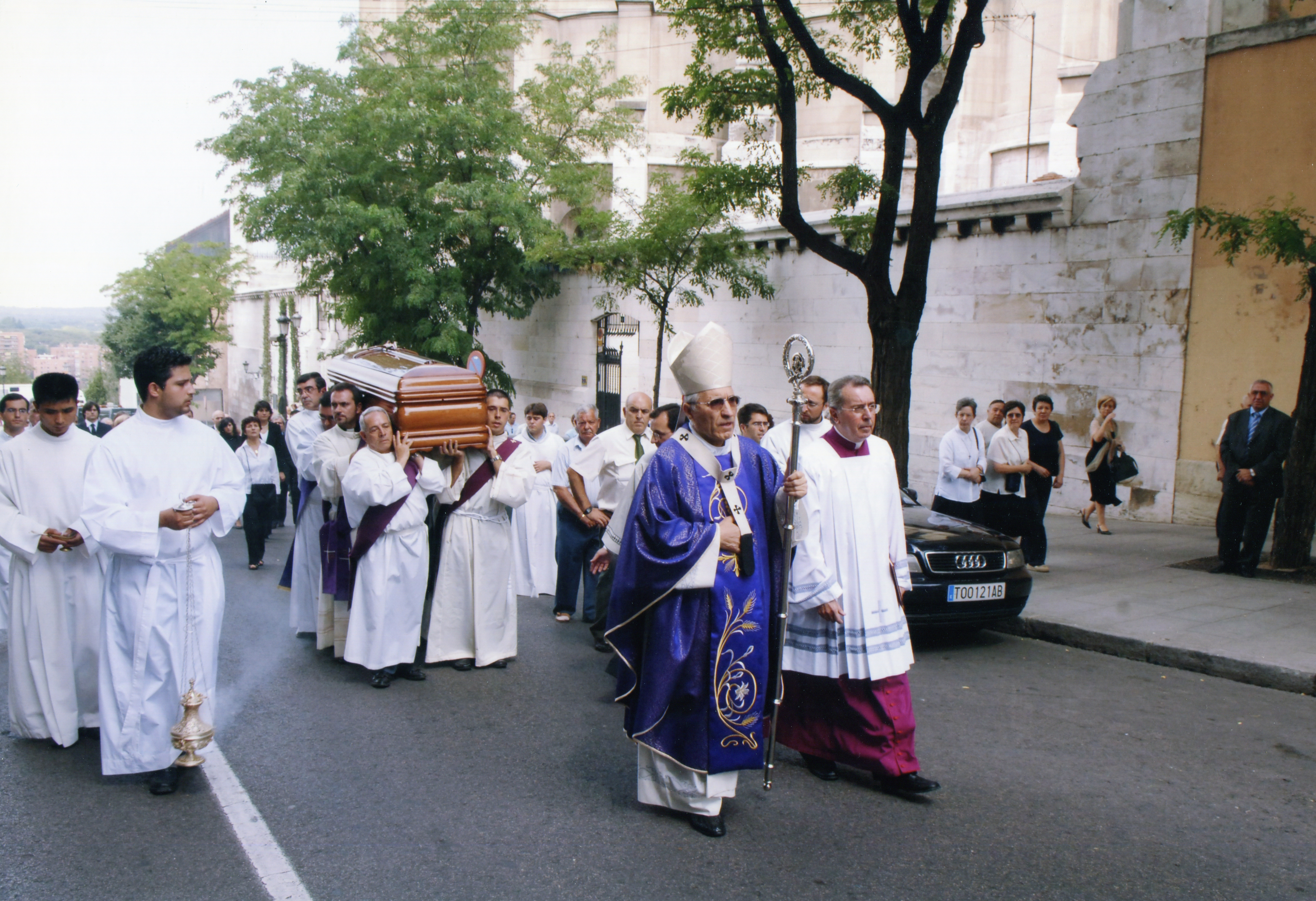
His successor, Antonio María Rouco Varela, leading the procession in his funeral

Catholic Church titles
Preceded by Vicente Enrique y Tarancón	Archbishop of Madrid; 12 April 1983 – 28 July 1994	Succeeded by Antonio María Rouco Varela
