= Archdiocese of Toledo =

Catholic archdiocese in Spain

Coordinates: 39.8575°N 4.0231°W

Metropolitan Archdiocese of Toledo Archidiœcesis Metropolitae Toletana Archidiócesis de Toledo

Catholic
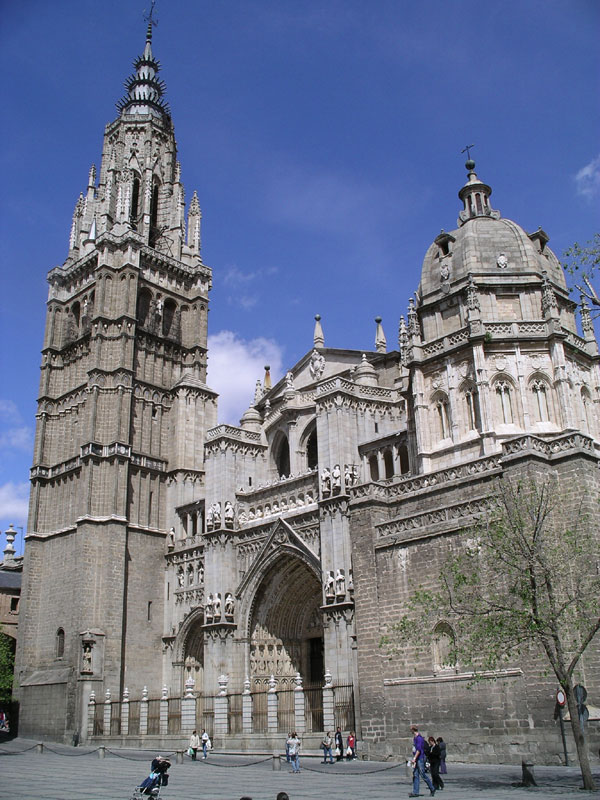

- Coat of arms

Location
- Country: Spain
- Territory: Province of Toledo, Parts of the Province of Cáceres and the Province of Badajoz
- Ecclesiastical province: Toledo

Statistics
- Area: 19,333 km^{2} (7,465 sq mi)
- Population: Total; Catholics: (as of 2010); 719,482; 636,477 (88.5%)
- Parishes: 270

Information
- Denomination: Catholic
- Sui iuris church: Latin Church
- Rite: Mozarabic Rite; Roman Rite
- Established: 1st century (as Diocese of Toledo); 4th century (as Metropolitan Archdiocese of Toledo)
- Cathedral: Primatial Cathedral of St Mary in Toledo

Current leadership
- Pope: Leo XIV
- Archbishop: Francisco Cerro Chaves
- Metropolitan Archbishop: Francisco Cerro Chaves
- Suffragans: Diocese of Albacete; Diocese of Ciudad Real; Diocese of Cuenca; Diocese of Sigüenza-Guadalajara
- Auxiliary Bishops: Ángel Fernández Collado
- Bishops emeritus: Joaquín Carmelo Borobia Isasa; Braulio Rodríguez Plaza

Map

Website
- architoledo.org

The Archdiocese of Toledo (Latin: Archidioecesis Metropolitae Toletana) is a Latin Church archdiocese of the Catholic Church located in Spain. It is also the Primate of Spain. It was, according to tradition, established in the 1st century by James the Great and was elevated to an archdiocese in 313 after the Edict of Milan. The incumbent Metropolitan Archbishop also bears the title Primate of Spain and since 1937 the title General Vicar of the Armies (but the pastoral care for the Spanish armed forces is now provided, since 1986, by the Military Archbishopric of Spain).

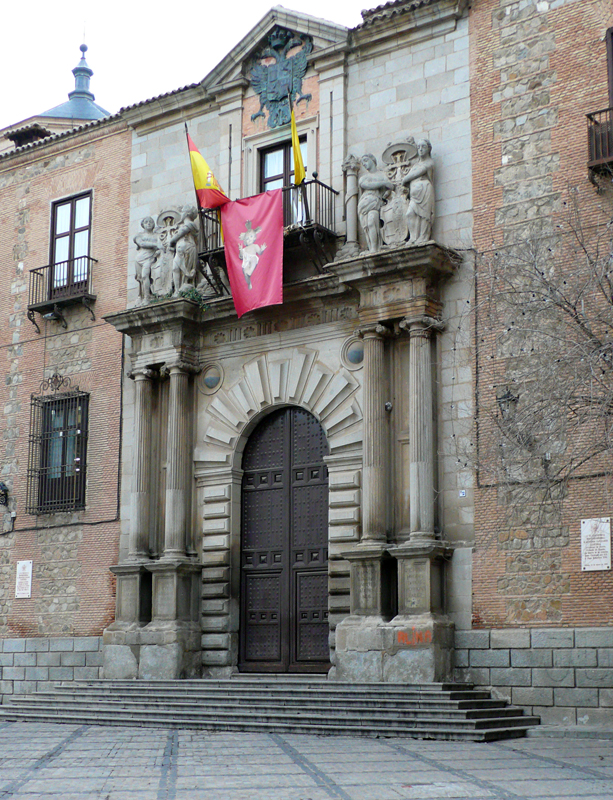
Archbishop's Palace (Palacio Arzobispal) in Toledo

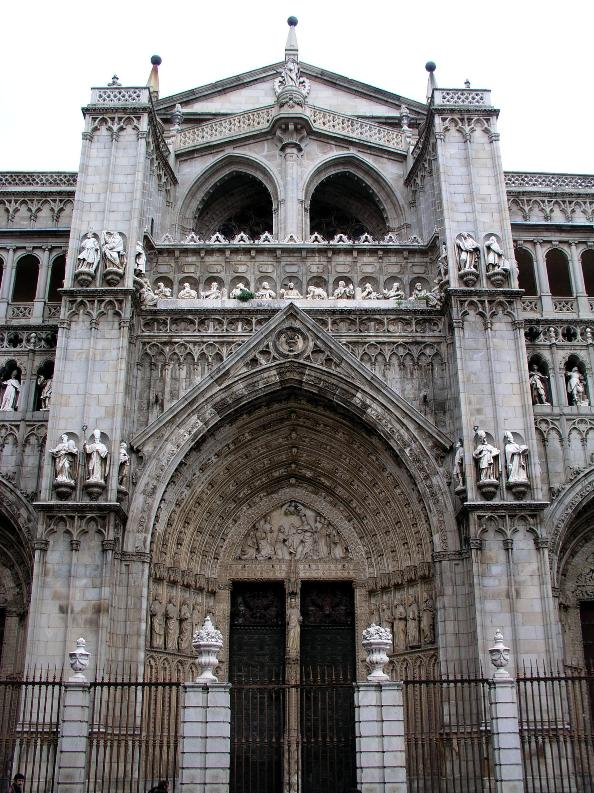
Main entrance to the Cathedral

== List ==
=== Bishops ===
1. Eugenius (1st century?) – legendary, supposedly a disciple of Dionysius the Areopagite
2. Melantius (286?–306?)

There are thought to have been bishops between and after these two, but their identities and dates of tenure are unknown.

=== Archbishops ===
3. Patruinus (325–335)
4. Toribius (335–345)
5. Quintus (345–355)
6. Vincent (355–365)
7. Paulatus (365–375)
8. Natallus (375–385)
9. Audentius (385–395)
10. Asturius (395–412)
11. Isicius (412–427)
12. Martin I (427–440)
13. Castinus (440–454)
14. Campeius (454–467)
15. Sinticius (467–482)
16. Praumatus (482–494)
17. Petrus I (494–508)
18. Celsus (?–520)
19. Montanus (523–531)
20. Julian I
21. Bacauda
22. Petrus II
23. Euphemius
24. Exuperius
25. Adelphus
26. Conancius
27. Aurasius (603–615)
28. Eladius (615–633)
29. Justus (633–636)
30. Eugenius I (636–646)
31. Eugenius II (646–657)
32. Ildefonso (657–667)
33. Quiricus (667–680)
34. Julian II (680–690)
35. Sisbert (690–693)
36. Felix (694–700)
37. Gunderic (700–710)
38. Sindered (711–?)
39. Sunirend
40. Concordius
41. Cixila (745/774–754/783)
42. Elipandus (754/783–808?)
43. Gumesind (?–828)
44. Wistremir (?–858)
  - (Eulogius 859; elected but did not take office)
45. Bonitus (859–892)
46. Juan I (892–926)
47. Ubayd Allah ben Qasim

See vacant due to Muslim rule (Umayyad Caliphate of Córdoba)

48. Pascual I (1058–1080)
  - Vacant
49. Bernard de Sedirac (1086–1124)
50. Raymond de Sauvetât (1124–1152)
51. Juan II (1152–1166)
52. Cerebruno (1167–1180)
53. Pedro III de Cardona (1181–1182)
54. Gonzalo I Petrez (1182–1191)
55. Martín II López de Pisuerga (1192–1208)
56. Rodrigo Jimenez de Rada (1209–1247)
57. Juan III Medina de Pomar (1248–1248)
58. Gutierre I Ruiz Dolea (1249–1250)
59. Infante Sancho of Castile (1251–1261)
60. Domingo Pascual (1262–1265)
61. Infante Sancho of Aragon (1266–1275)
62. Fernando I Rodriguez de Covarubias (1276–1280)
63. Gonzalo II Pérez Gudiel (1280–1299)
64. Gonzalo III Diaz Palomeque (1299–1310)
65. Gutierre II Gomez de Toledo (1310–1319)
66. Juan III, Infante of Aragon (1319–1328); also Latin Patriarch of Alexandria
67. Jimeno de Luna (1328–1338)
68. Gil Alvarez de Albornoz (1338–1350)
69. Gonzalo IV de Aguilar (1351–1353)
70. Blas Fernandez de Toledo (1353–1362)
71. Gómez Manrique (bishop) (1362–1375)
72. Pedro IV Tenorio (1375–1399)
  - Vacant
73. Pedro V de Luna (1403–1414)
74. Sancho III de Rojas (1415–1422)
75. Juan IV Martinez de Contreras (1423–1434)
76. Juan V de Cerezuela (1434–1442)
77. Gutierre III Alvarez de Toledo (1442–1445)
78. Alfonso Carillo de Acuna (1446–1482)
79. Pedro VI Gonzalez de Mendoza (1482–1495)
80. Francisco I Ximénez de Cisneros (1495–1517)
81. Guillermo de Croy (1517–1521)
  - Vacant
82. Alonso III Fonseca (1523–1534)
83. Juan VI Pardo Tavera (1534–1545)
84. Juan VII Martinez Silecio (1545–1557)
85. Bartolomé Carranza (1558–1576)
86. Gaspar I de Quiroga y Vela (1577–1594)
87. Albert of Austria (1595–1598), later Archduke of Austria
88. García Loaysa y Girón (1598–1599)
89. Bernardo II de Sandoval y Rojas (1599–1618)
  - Vacant
90. Ferdinand of Austria (Apostolic Administrator, 1620–1641)
  - Vacant
91. Gaspar II de Borja y Velasco (1645)
92. Baltasar Moscoso y Sandoval (1646–1665)
93. Pascual II de Aragon (1666–1677)
94. Luis Manuel Fernández de Portocarrero (1677–1709)
  - Vacant
95. Francisco Valero y Losa (1715–1720)
96. Diego de Astorga y Céspedes (1720–1724)
  - Vacant
97. Luis I de Borbon y Farnesio (1735–1754)
98. Luis II Fernandez de Cordoba (1755–1771)
99. Francisco Antonio de Lorenzana (1772–1800)
100. Luis María de Borbón y Vallabriga, 14th Count of Chinchón (1800–1823)
101. Pedro Inguanzo y Rivero (1824–1836)
  - Vacant
102. Juan José Bonel y Orbe (1849–1857)
103. Cirilo Alameda y Brea (1857–1872)
  - Vacant
104. Juan Ignacio Moreno y Maisanove (1875–1884)
105. Zeferino González y Díaz Tuñón (1885–1886)
106. Miguel Payá y Rico (1886–1891)
107. Antolín Monescillo y Viso (1892–1898)
108. Bl. Ciriaco María Sancha y Hervás (1898–1909)
109. Gregorio Maria Aguirre y Garcia (1909–1913)
110. Victoriano Guisasola y Menendez (1913–1920)
111. Enrique Almaraz y Santos (1920–1921)
112. Enrique Reig y Casanova (1922–1927)
113. Pedro Segura y Sáenz (1927–1931)
  - Vacant
114. Isidro Goma y Tomas (1933–1940)
115. Enrique Pla y Deniel (1941–1968)
116. Vicente Enrique y Tarancón (1969–1972)
117. Marcelo Gonzalez Martin (1972–1995)
118. Francisco Alvarez Martínez (1995–2002)
119. Antonio Cañizares Llovera (2002–2008)
120. Braulio Rodríguez Plaza (2009–2019)
121. Francisco Cerro Chaves (2019–present)

== Auxiliary bishops in the archdiocese ==
- Pedro del Campo (1516–1551)
- Pedro Ruiz de la Camera (1524)
- Guillermo (1539)
- Pedro Oriona (1549–1560)
- Diego de la Calzada (1578)
- Melchor Soria Vera (1602–1643)
- Juan Avellaneda Manrique (1611)
- Diego Pereda (1621–1634)
- Alfonso de Requeséns Fenollet (1621–1625), appointed Bishop of Barbastro
- Francisco Olivares Maldonado (1626–1632)
- Julián Alvear (Alvera) (1631)
- Juan Boldames Ibáñez (1632–1633)
- Miguel Avellán (1633–1650)
- Pedro Orozco (1643)
- Francisco Villagutiérrez Chumacero (1646–1652)
- Rodrigo de Mandia y Parga, (1652–1663), appointed Bishop of Almería
- Miguel Pérez Cevallos (1660–1681)
- Antonio del Buffalo (1661–1666)
- Luis de Morales (bishop) (1661–1679)
- Francisco Zapata Vera y Morales (1680–1703)
- Alfonso de Santa Cruz (1683–1698)
- Benito Madueño y Ramos (1698–1739)
- Atanasio Esterriga Trajanáuregui (1703–1712)
- Dionisio Francisco Mellado Eguíluz (1716)
- Andrés Núñez Monteagudo (1739–1761)
- Juan Antonio Pérez Arellano (1739–1756)
- Juan Francisco Manrique Lara (1749–1754)
- Augstín González Pisador (1754–1760)
- Juan Manuel Argüelles (1761–1770)
- Felipe Pérez Santa María (1761–1795)
- Miguel González Bobela (1771–1775)
- Francisco Mateo Aguiriano Gómez (1776–1790)
- Atanasio Puyal y Poveda (1790–1814)
- Francisco Javier de Lizana y Beaumont (1795–1800)
- Buenaventura Moyano Rodríguez (1800–1801)
- Alfonso Aguado y Jaraba (1802–1815)
- Luis Gregorio López Castillo (1815–1825)
- Juan Arciniega (1816–1835)
- Pablo García Abella (1827–1833)
- Francisco de Sales Crespo y Bautista (1861–1875)
- Juan Francisco Bux y Loras (1882–1882)
- Tomás Jenaro de Cámara y Castro (1883–1885)
- Valeriano Menéndez y Conde (1887–1894)
- José Ramón Quesada y Gascón (1894–1898)
- Juan José Laguarda y Fenollera (1899–un 1902)
- Isidoro Badía y Sarradell (1903–1907)
- Prudencio Melo y Alcalde (1907–1913)
- Antonio Álvaro y Ballano (1913–1914)
- Juan Bautista Luis y Pérez (1915–1921)
- Mateo Colom y Canals (1921–1922)
- Rafael Balanzá y Navarro (1923–1928)
- Feliciano Rocha Pizarro (1928–1935)
- Gregorio Modrego y Casaus (1936–1942)
- Eduardo Martinez González (1942–1950)
- Francisco Miranda Vicente (1951–1960)
- Anastasio Granados García (1960–1970)
- Rafael Palmero Ramos (1987–1996)
- Juan José Asenjo Pelegrina (1997–2003)
- Joaquín Carmelo Borobia Isasa (2004–2010)
- Ángel Rubio Castro (2004–2007)
- Ángel Fernández Collado (2013–present)

== Suffragan dioceses ==
- Diocese of Albacete
- Diocese of Ciudad Real
- Diocese of Cuenca
- Diocese of Sigüenza-Guadalajara

== See also ==
- Catholic Church in Spain
- Council of Elvira
- Councils of Toledo
- Patriarch of the West Indies
- Grand Inquisitor
- Mozarabic Rite
