= José Delicado Baeza =

Spanish Roman Catholic archbishop

- Archbishop of Valladolid
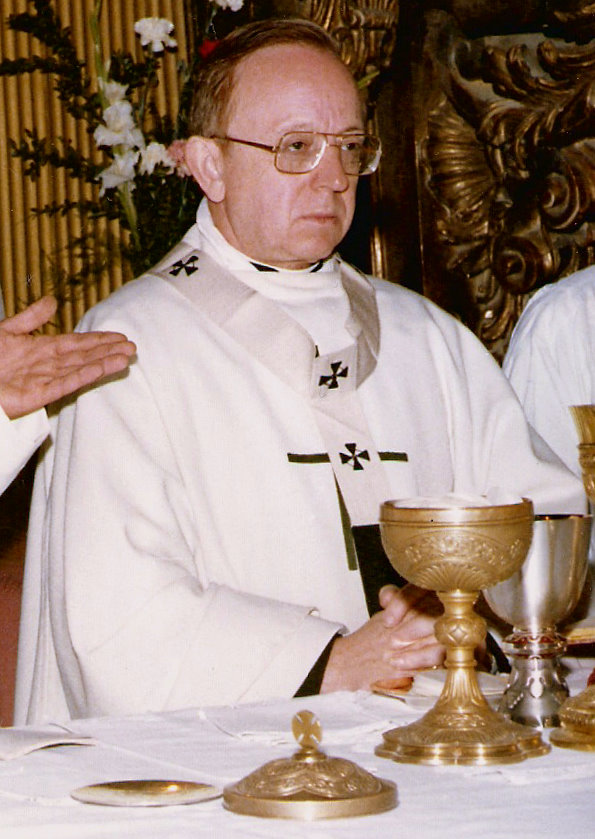
- José Delicado Baeza in 1981
- Church: Catholic Church
- Archdiocese: Archdiocese of Valladolid
- In office: 18 April 1975 – 28 August 2002
- Predecessor: Félix Romero Menjíbar
- Successor: Braulio Rodríguez Plaza
- Previous post: Bishop of Tuy-Vigo (1969-1975)

Orders
- Ordination: 21 July 1951
- Consecration: 28 September 1969 by Arturo Tabera Araoz

Personal details
- Born: 18 January 1927 Almansa, Province of Albacete, Kingdom of Spain
- Died: 17 March 2014 (aged 87)

José Delicado Baeza (18 January 1927 – 17 March 2014) was a Roman Catholic archbishop.

Ordained to the priesthood in 1951, Baeza was appointed bishop of the Roman Catholic Diocese of Tui-Vigo, Spain in 1969 and then archbishop of the Roman Catholic Archdiocese of Valladolid in 1975 and retired in 2002.
