= Giovanni Montoja de Cardona =

Most Reverend Giovanni Montoya de Cardona
- Bishop of Gallipoli
- Church: Catholic Church
- Diocese: Diocese of Gallipoli
- In office: 1659–1667
- Predecessor: Andrea Massa
- Successor: Antonio del Buffalo

Orders
- Consecration: 15 June 1659 by Francesco Maria Brancaccio

Personal details
- Born: Naples, Italy
- Died: 9 March 1667 Gallipoli, Apulia, Italy

Giovanni Montoya de Cardona or Giovanni Montoja de Cardona (died 1667) was a Roman Catholic prelate who served as Bishop of Gallipoli (1659–1667).

== Biography ==
Giovanni Montoya de Cardona was born in Naples, Italy. On 4 December 1658, he was selected as Bishop of Gallipoli and confirmed by Pope Alexander VII on 9 June 1659. On 15 June 1659, he was consecrated bishop by Francesco Maria Brancaccio, Cardinal-Priest of Santi XII Apostoli, with Stefano Quaranta, Archbishop of Amalfi, and Persio Caracci, Bishop Emeritus of Larino, serving as co-consecrators. He served as Bishop of Gallipoli until his death on 9 March 1667.

== External links and additional sources ==
- Cheney, David M. "Diocese of Gallipoli". Catholic-Hierarchy.org. (for Chronology of Bishops) ^{[self-published]}
- Chow, Gabriel. "Diocese of Gallipoli (Italy)". GCatholic.org. (for Chronology of Bishops) ^{[self-published]}

Catholic Church titles
Preceded by Andrea Massa	Bishop of Gallipoli; 1658–1667	Succeeded by Antonio del Buffalo
