= Iglesia del Sacramento =

Cathedral Church of the Armed Forces
- Iglesia del Sacramento
- Iglesia Catedral de las Fuerzas Armadas
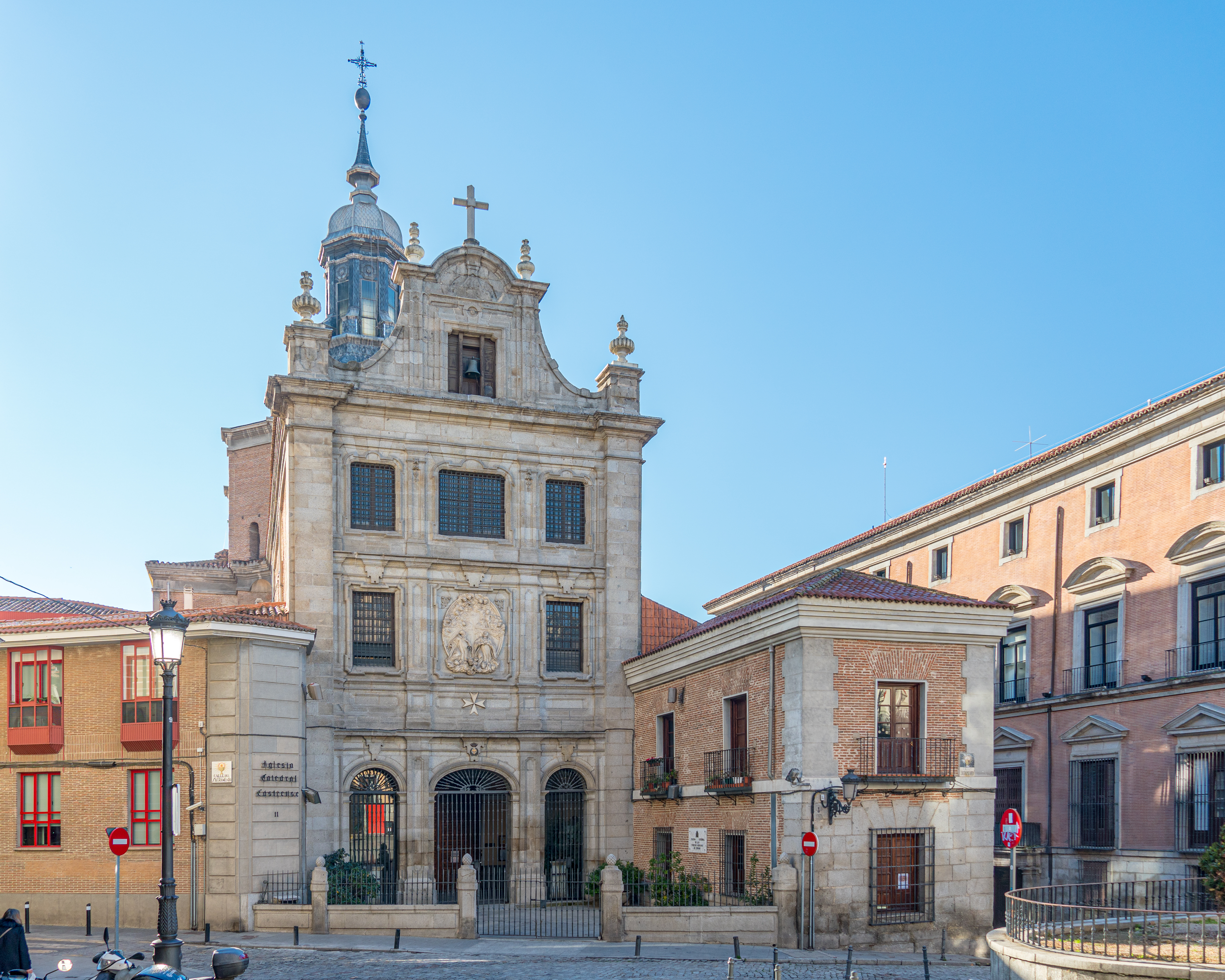
- View from the Calle Mayor
- Cathedral Church of the Armed Forces
- Location: Madrid
- Address: Calle del Sacramento, 9
- Country: Spain
- Denomination: Catholic Church

History
- Status: Cathedral
- Founded: 1615

Architecture
- Architect: Bartolomé Hurtado García
- Architectural type: Church architecture
- Style: Spanish Baroque
- Years built: 1671

Administration
- Archdiocese: Military Archbishopric of Spain

The Cathedral Church of the Armed Forces (Spanish: Iglesia Catedral de las Fuerzas Armadas), commonly known as Iglesia del Sacramento (Spanish for 'Church of the Sacrament'), is a 17th-century Baroque-style Catholic church located in Madrid, Spain. Since 1980 is the Military Cathedral of Spain and the seat of the Military Archbishop of Spain.

Designed by Juan Gómez Mora in 1615, work on the Church lasted from 1671, for 73 years of construction, and finalized in 1744. Intervening additional architects were Francisco Bautista, Manuel del Olmo, and Bartolomé Hurtado García. It was declared Bien de Interés Cultural in 1982.

== See also ==
- Catholic Church in Spain
- List of oldest church buildings
