= Pedro del Campo =

Spanish Roman Catholic prelate

Most Reverend Pedro del Campo
- Auxiliary Bishop of Toledo; Titular Bishop of Utica
- Church: Catholic Church
- Archdiocese: Archdiocese of Toledo
- In office: 1516–1551

Personal details
- Died: 1551 Toledo, Spain

Pedro del Campo (died 1551) was a Roman Catholic prelate who served as Auxiliary Bishop of Toledo (1516–1551) and Titular Bishop of Utica (1516–1551).

== Biography ==
Pedro del Campo was born in Salamanca, Spain. On 4 Jul 1516, Pedro del Campo was appointed during the papacy of Pope Leo X as Auxiliary Bishop of Toledo and Titular Bishop of Utica and Auxiliary Bishop of Toledo (1516–1551). He served as Auxiliary Bishop of Toledo until his death in 1551. While bishop, he was the principal consecrator of Juan Yañez, Bishop of Calahorra y La Calzada (1544).

== External links and additional sources ==
- Cheney, David M. "Archdiocese of Toledo". Catholic-Hierarchy.org. (for Chronology of Bishops) ^{[self-published]}
- Chow, Gabriel. "Metropolitan Archdiocese of Toledo, Spain (Spain)". GCatholic.org. (for Chronology of Bishops) ^{[self-published]}
- Cheney, David M. "Utica (Titular See)". Catholic-Hierarchy.org. (for Chronology of Bishops) ^{[self-published]}
- Chow, Gabriel. "Titular Episcopal See of Utica (Tunisia)". GCatholic.org. (for Chronology of Bishops) ^{[self-published]}

Catholic Church titles
| Preceded by | Auxiliary Bishop of Toledo; 1516–1551 | Succeeded by |
| Preceded by | Titular Bishop of Utica; 1516–1551 | Succeeded by |
