= Francisco Naranjo =

Most Reverend Francisco Naranjo
- Bishop of Puerto Rico
- Church: Catholic Church
- Diocese: Diocese of Puerto Rico
- Predecessor: Hernando de Lobo Castrillo
- Successor: Juan Francisco Arnaldo Isasi

Personal details
- Died: 1655 San Juan, Puerto Rico

Francisco Naranjo, O.P. (died 1655) was a Roman Catholic prelate who served as Bishop of Puerto Rico (1652–1655).

== Biography ==
Francisco Naranjo was born in Mexico and ordained a priest in the Order of Preachers. In 1652, he was appointed by the King of Spain and confirmed by Pope Innocent X as Bishop of Puerto Rico. He served as Bishop of Puerto Rico until his death in 1655.

== External links and additional sources ==
- Cheney, David M. "Archdiocese of San Juan de Puerto Rico". Catholic-Hierarchy.org. (for Chronology of Bishops) ^{[self-published]}
- Chow, Gabriel. "Metropolitan Archdiocese of San Juan de Puerto Rico". GCatholic.org. (for Chronology of Bishops) ^{[self-published]}

Religious titles
Preceded by Hernando de Lobo Castrillo	Bishop of Puerto Rico; 1652–1655	Succeeded by Juan Francisco Arnaldo Isasi
