= Francisco Villagutiérrez Chumacero =

Spanish Roman Catholic prelate

Most Reverend Francisco Villagutiérrez Chumacero
- Auxiliary Bishop of Toledo
- Church: Catholic Church
- Archdiocese: Archdiocese of Toledo
- In office: 1646–1652

Personal details
- Born: 1587 Valladolid, Spain
- Died: 1652 (age 65) Toledo, Spain

Francisco Villagutiérrez Chumacero (1587–1652) was a Roman Catholic prelate who served as Auxiliary Bishop of Toledo (1646–1652).

== Biography ==
Francisco Villagutiérrez Chumacero was born in Valladolid, Spain in 1587 and ordained a priest in the Order of Saint Augustine. On 19 Feb 1646, he was appointed during the papacy of Pope Innocent X as Auxiliary Bishop of Toledo and Titular Bishop of Troas. He served as Auxiliary Bishop of Toledo until his death in 1652.
