= Audentius (bishop of Toledo) =

Early Catholic bishop

Audentius (Latin: Audentius) was bishop of Toledo (Hispania), according to tradition in the years 385-395 AD. In the Catholic Encyclopedia (1912), the Count of Cedillo places his episcopate around the year 376. In the 17th century, William Cave supposed him to have lived about 260 AD.

The historian Gennadius of Massilia mentions in De viris illustribus (ch. 14; ca. 480 AD) that a certain Audentius wrote the book De fide adversus haereticos, in which he wrote against the Manichaeans, the Sabellians, the Arians, and, with especial energy, against the Photinians. Audentius's object was to show that the second person in the Trinity is co-eternal with the Father. The book has been lost.

In the book De scriptoribus ecclesiasticis (1494), abbot Johannes Trithemius styles this Audentius as "vir in divinis scripturis exercitatum habens ingenium."

In the Catholic Encyclopedia (1912), the Count of Cedillo considers both Audentius's to be the same person.

Preceded by Natallus	Bishop of Toledo; 385 – 395	Succeeded by Asturius
