= Emilio Benavent Escuín =

Spanish Archbishop

His Excellency Emilio Benavent Escuín
- Archbishop of the Spanish Military
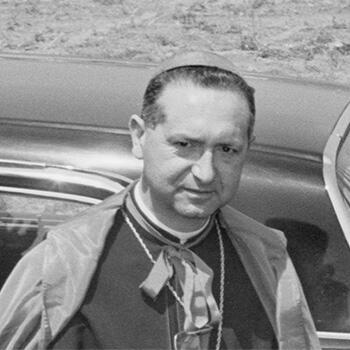
- Emilio Benavent Escuín, c. 1956
- Church: Roman Catholic Church
- See: Titular see of Maximiana in Numidia
- In office: 1977–1998
- Predecessor: Joseph Jean Marie Rozier
- Successor: Joseph Mugenyi Sabiiti
- Previous posts: Auxiliary Bishop of Málaga (1954-1960); Coadjutor Bishop of Málaga (1960-1966); Apostolic Administrator of Málaga (1966-1967); Bishop of Málaga (1967-1968); Coadjutor Archbishop of Granada (1968-1974); Archbishop of Granada (1974-1977)Archbishop of Spain, Military (1977-1982); Titular Archbishop of Maximiana in Numidia (1977-1998)

Orders
- Ordination: 18 July 1943
- Consecration: 13 February 1955 by Ildebrando Antoniutti
- Rank: Archbishop

Personal details
- Born: 10 April 1914 Valencia, Spain
- Died: 3 January 2008 (aged 93)

Emilio Benavent Escuín (10 April 1914 – 4 January 2008) was a Spanish Archbishop of the Roman Catholic Church.

== Biography ==
Escuín was born in Valencia, Spain and was ordained a priest on 18 July 1943. He was appointed auxiliary bishop of the Diocese of Málaga as well as titular Bishop of Cercina on 6 December 1954 and was consecrated on 13 February 1955. On 13 February 1960 he was appointed coadjutor Bishop of Diocese of Málaga and then bishop on 7 April 1967. The Following year Escuín was appointed coadjutor bishop of the Archdiocese of Granada and Titular bishop of Tiburnia. Escuin succeeded as Archbishop of the Archdiocese of Granada. He was appointed bishop of the Military Ordinariate of Spain on as well as titular bishop of Maximiana in Numidia. Escuin resigned from Military Ordinariate in October 1982 and as titular bishop of Maximiana in Numidia on 7 March 1998.

Archbishop Escuín died on 4 January 2008 at the age of 93.

== See also ==
- Barbastro Diocese
