= Aldea del Fresno =

Coordinates: 40°19′N 4°12′W

- Municipality
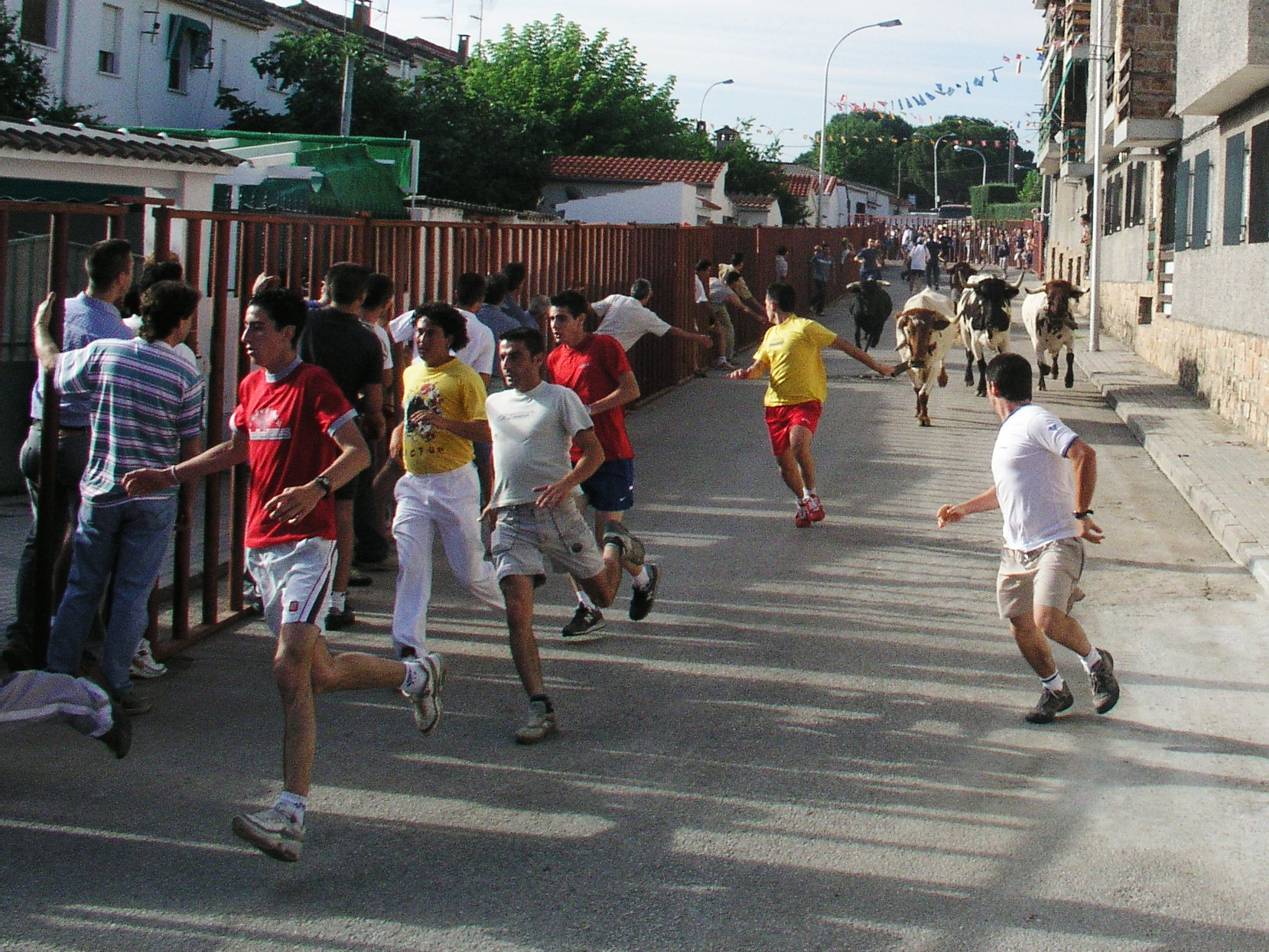

- Coat of arms

- Municipal location within the Community of Madrid.
- Country: Spain
- Autonomous community: Community of Madrid

Area
  - Total: 19.99 sq mi (51.78 km^{2})

Population (2025-01-01)
  - Total: 3,503
- Time zone: UTC+1 (CET)
  - Summer (DST): UTC+2 (CEST)

Aldea del Fresno (Spanish pronunciation: [alˈdea ðel ˈfɾesno]) is a municipality of the autonomous community of the Community of Madrid in central Spain.

Aldea del Fresno goes from north to south along the Alberche river.

== Politics ==
Party	Votes	%	+/-	Seats	+/-
Independents	510	33.39	6.98	4	1
PSOE	386	25.27	0.83	3	0
PP	281	18.40	▼5.33	2	▼1
Vox	258	16.89	▲8.16	2	1
IU/Podemos/AV	60	3.92	▼0.92	0	0
Contigo	13	0.85	New	0	New
No overall control, Independent minority with PSOE					
