= Military Archbishopric of Spain =

Roman Catholic archdiocese in Spain

Military Archbishopric of Spain Arzobispado Castrense de España
- Emblem of the Military Archbishopric of Spain

Location
- Country: Spain

Information
- Denomination: Roman Catholic
- Rite: Latin Rite
- Established: 1705; 321 years ago
- Cathedral: Cathedral of the Blessed Sacrament in Madrid

Current leadership
- Pope: Leo XIV
- Archbishop: Juan Antonio Aznárez Cobo

The Military Archbishopric of Spain (Spanish: Arzobispado Castrense de España) is a military ordinariate of the Roman Catholic Church. Immediately subject to the Holy See, it provides pastoral care to Roman Catholics serving in the Spanish Armed Forces and their families.

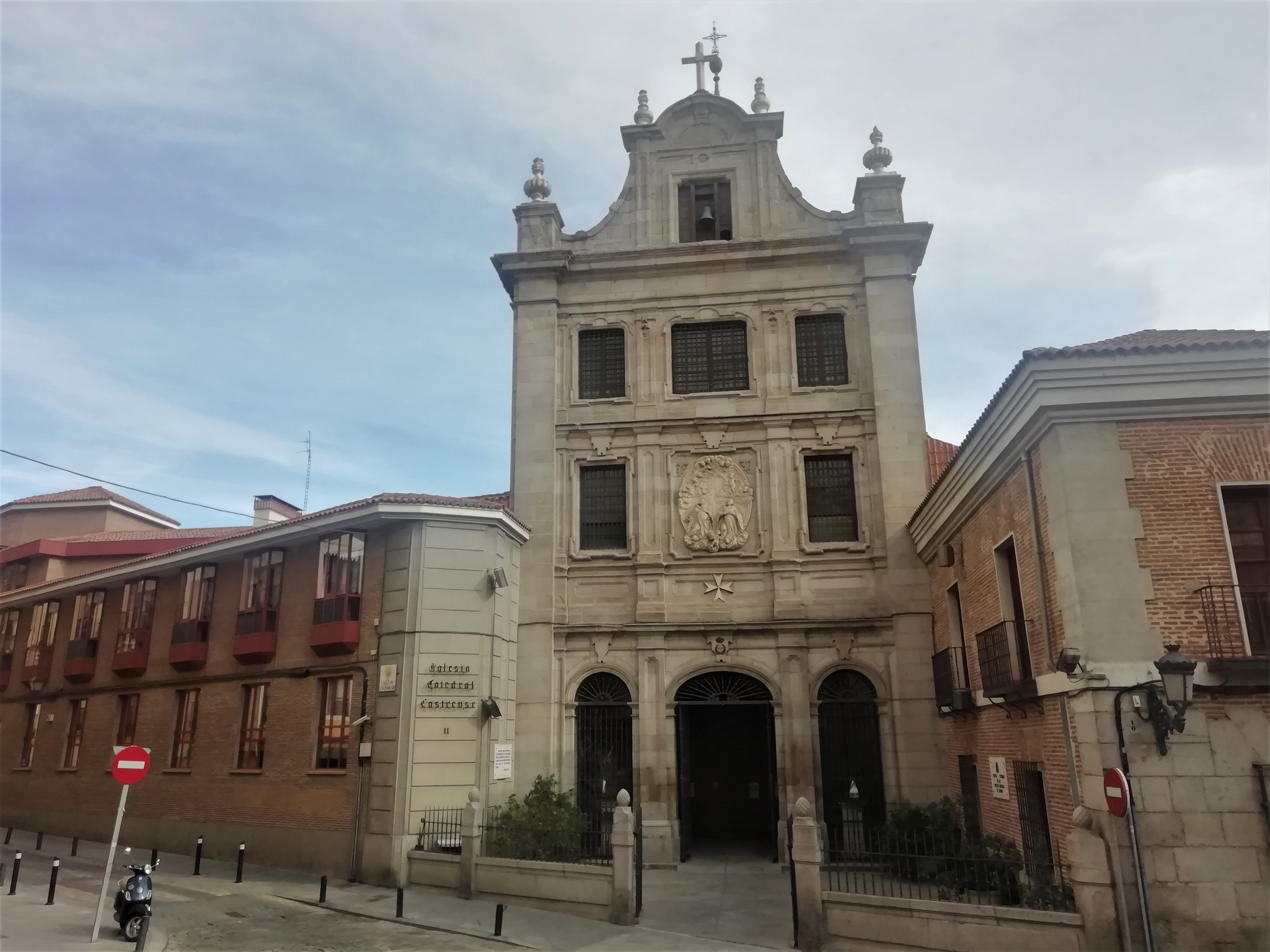
Cathedral Church of the Armed Forces, in Madrid.

== History ==
The General Vicar of the Armies were Royal Chief Chaplains whose office was to serve the Spanish Armed Forces. The office was first established in 1644 and was attached with the title Patriarch of the West Indies (except for the period of 1891–1920). At first it existed in wartime period, but was permanently established in 1762. Also it was abolished during the First and Second Spanish republican era (1873–1874, 1932–1937).

The first military vicariate-general, Carlos de Borja y Centellas, was appointed in 1705.

The position was suppressed, or lapsed in abeyance, in 1930. A military vicariate was re-established on 5 August 1950, and a few months later a military vicar was appointed on 12 December 1950. It was elevated to a military ordinariate on 21 July 1986 and is headed by an archbishop.

In 2012, the Archbishop took part in a conference commemorating the 1,700th anniversary of the Battle of the Milvian Bridge, which marked the legalization of Christianity. In 2026, the current Archbishop organized the Spanish military presence at the 66th annual military pilgrimage to Lourdes.

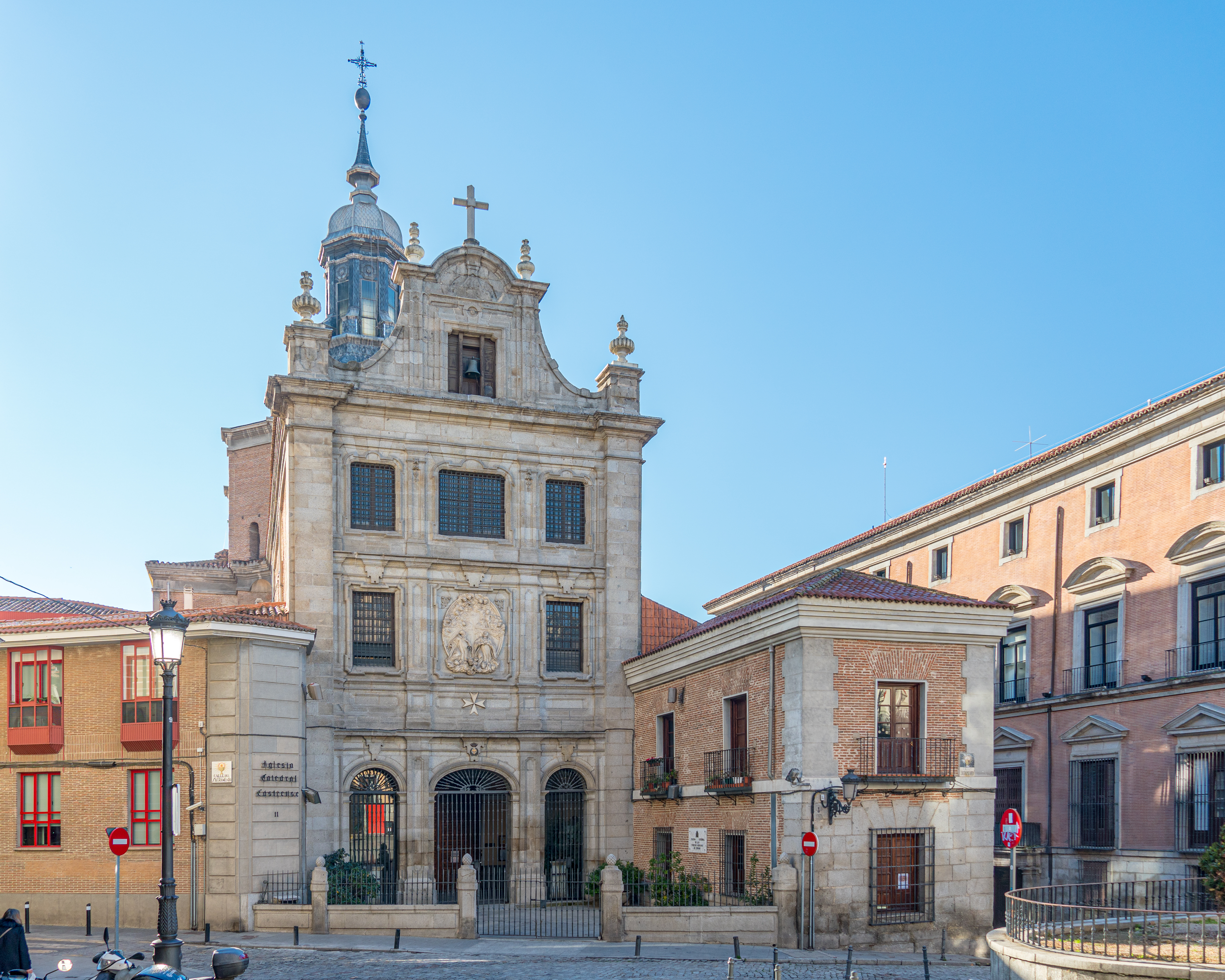
View of the Cathedral of the Armed Forces from the Calle Mayor

The Episcopal seat is located at the Cathedral of the Armed Forces (Catedral de las Fuerzas Armadas) in Madrid, Spain.

== Office holders ==
The ordinaries of the diocese have been as follows:

=== Military bishops ===
- Jaime Cardona y Tur (appointed 11 July 1892 – died 6 January 1923)
- Ramón Pérez y Rodríguez (appointed 7 January 1929 – translated to the Patriarchate of the West Indies 30 June 1930)

=== Military vicars ===
- Luis Alonso Muñoyerro (appointed 12 December 1950 – died 23 September 1968)
- José López Ortiz, O.S.A. (appointed 18 February 1969 – retired 28 May 1977)
- Emilio Benavent Escuín (appointed 25 May 1977 – resigned 27 October 1982)
- José Manuel Estepa Llaurens (appointed 30 July 1983 – became Military Ordinary 21 July 1986)

=== Military ordinaries ===
- José Manuel Estepa Llaurens (appointed 21 July 1986 – retired 30 October 2003)
- Francisco Pérez González (appointed 30 October 2003 – translated to the Archdiocese of Pamplona y Tudela 31 July 2007)
- Juan del Río Martín (appointed 30 June 2008 – died 28 January 2021)
- Juan Antonio Aznárez Cobo (appointed 15 November 2021)

== Noncombatant status ==
See: Military chaplain#Non-combatant status

== Rank insignias ==
Regular Chaplain with status as Colonel	Regular Chaplain with status as Lieutenant colonel	Regular Chaplain with status as Major	Temporary Chaplain with status as Captain

== See also ==
- General Vicar of the Armies
- Patron saints of the military
- Military chaplain
- Cruz Fidélitas
