= Diocese of Gallipoli =

Latin Catholic diocese in Italy (6th century - 1986)

The Diocese of Gallipoli (Latin: Dioecesis Gallipolitana) was a Latin Church ecclesiastical territory of the Catholic Church in the province of Apulia in southern Italy. It was erected in the 6th century. On September 30, 1986, the diocese was suppressed, and its territory merged into the Diocese of Nardò-Gallipoli.

== History ==
In the Synecdemus of Hierocles of the time of the Emperor Justinian (527–565), Gallipoli is listed as a suffragan bishopric of the metropolitan of Sancta Severina. At the end of the century, however, it is clear from letters of Pope Gregory I (590–604) that the bishop of Gallipoli was subject to his jurisdiction.

In 663, following the defeat of the Byzantine armada of Constans II at Benevento, which was trying to destroy the Lombard duchy of Benevento, the Lombards took control of southeastern Italy and became overlords of Gallipoli. Previous to that date, Gallipoli had been part of the Byzantine empire. The Lombards also finally destroyed the city of Ravenna in 751, and the Exarchate of Ravenna ceased to exist. The surviving Greek territories were grouped under the Theme of Sicily, governed by a Strategos. A letter of Pope Adrian I (772–795) indicates that Gallipoli belonged to that Byzantine theme.

When the Lombards were driven out in the Byzantine reconquest of southern Italy, the Church of Gallipoli returned to its obedience to the Greek Metropolitan of Santa Severina. This is the situation in the Diatyposis of Leo IV (c. 900).

The attacks of the Normans in the area began in 1055. The Greeks were forced to withdraw from Apulia, and Gallipoli was incorporated by the Normans of Sicily in 1071. Duke Roger granted Apulia to his brother Bohemund, who became the prince of Taranto and lord of Gallipoli. This brought Gallipoli back into contact with the Roman Church.

The Liber Censuum of the Roman Church, which was compiled beginning in 1192, includes the diocese of Gallipoli as a suffragan of the archdiocese of Otranto. In the archdiocese of Otranto, payments are owed by the Church of S. Maria de Nardò, and by the monastery of S. Nicolas de Casulis. With regard to Gallipoli, there is only the note "Est Graecus". The adjective Graecus requires a noun of the masculine gender, probably Episcopus. Elsewhere in the Liber Censuum, there are entries for sums owed by individual bishops. Unfortunately the names and status of individual bishops of Gallipoli at the end of the 12th and first quarter of the 13th centuries are unknown.

The city of Gallipoli was completely destroyed by Charles of Anjou, King of Naples (1266–1285), and for a considerable time remained desolate. The abbot of S. Maria di Nardò exercised jurisdiction over the territory. Gallipoli was nonetheless in danger, due to the Great Western Schism. In 1379, the Avignon pope, Clement VII, created the diocese of Nardò, with a bishop who had been the Abbot of S. Maria di Nardò. He was driven out in 1401 and the diocese was suppressed. But then in 1413, Pope John XXIII, who ruled in Rome, created a new diocese of Nardò in 1413, and again chose the Abbot of S. Maria di Nardò to be its bishop. In these transactions, Gallipoli lost the towns of Copertino, Galatone, Secli, Nohe, Neviano, Tuglie, Parabita, Alliste, Felline, Taviano, and Casarano, and its bishops had to spend the rest of the century defending their episcopal mensa ('property'). In 1463, Bishop Lodovico Spinelli obtained from the Prince of Taranto the grant of a tenth part of the baglia of Gallipoli. His successor Bishop Alfonso Spinelli obtained from King Ferdinand I the grant of a fifteenth of all the money paid into the royal customs collection agency (dogana) in Gallipoli.

On 26 December 1805, Napoleon I, King of Italy, and Emperor of the French, declared Ferdinand IV deposed, and replaced him with his own brother Joseph Bonaparte on 30 March 1806. Bonaparte brought with him to Naples the policies of the French Republic and Napoleonic empire, including the abolition of all traces of feudalism, financial reform through the abolition of old taxes (like the salt tax, and the dogana) and the abolition of tax farming, and the imposition of the Code Napoleon. Bishop Giovanni Dalla Croce (1792–1820) was arrested, and imprisoned in Lecce for a period of eight months.

By a law of 13 February 1807, all of the houses of Benedictines or Cistercians were suppressed, and their property confiscated by the State, to be used for pensions to subsidize the transition of the monks to the condition of being secular priests. The mendicant orders were allowed to survive, and were assigned to teach in elementary schools. Property which had belonged to the suppressed Society of Jesus was confiscated, sold, and the money applied to the Monti di pietà. Any feudal dues or obligations which might have been attached to the property were abolished.

=== Chapter and cathedral ===
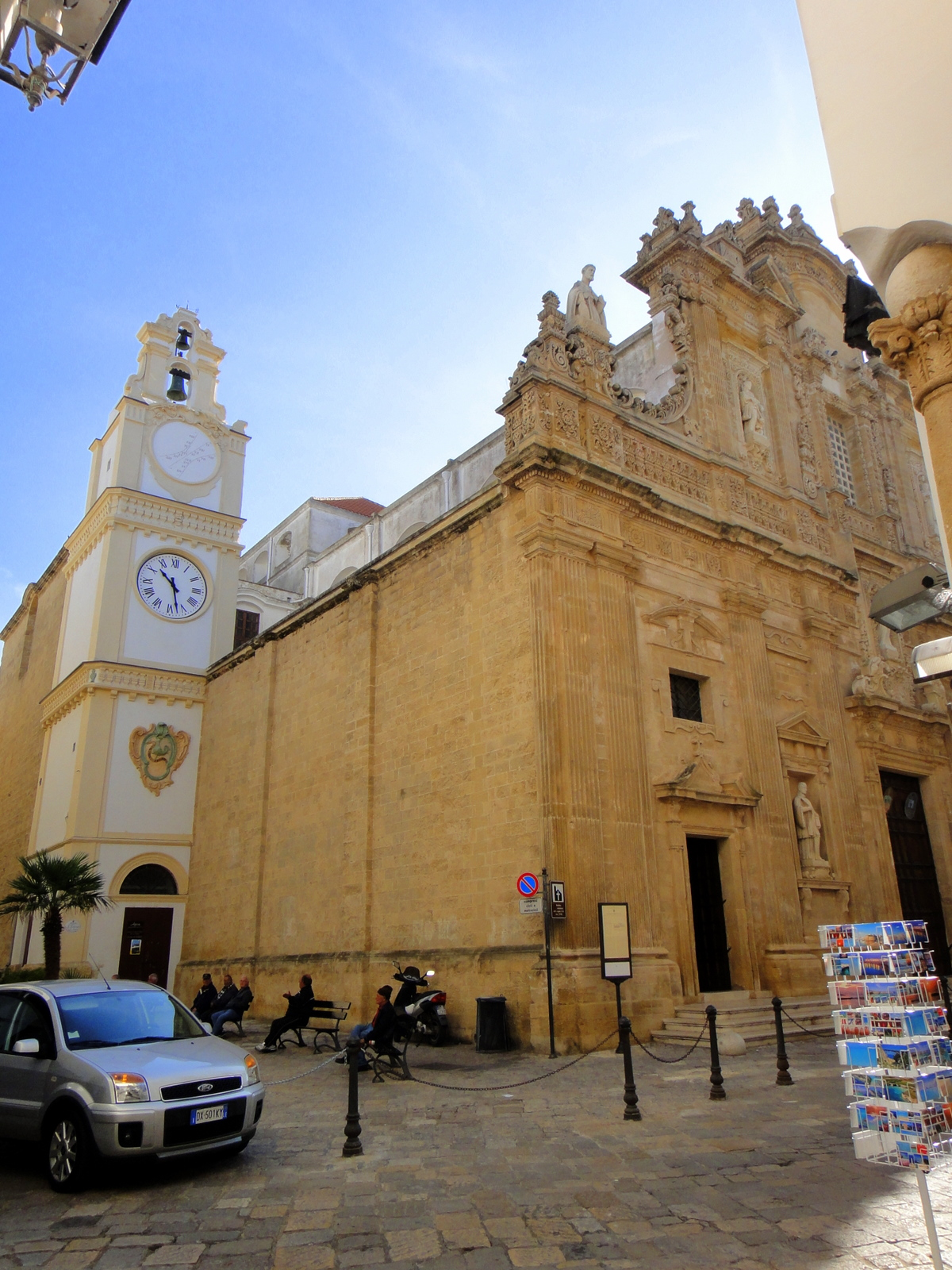
Cathedral of S. Agata

The original cathedral was dedicated to S. John Chrysostom, probably indicating a Greek origin. A dedication to S. Agatha was added, when her relics were acquired in 1126. The current cathedral was begun in 1629 by Bishop Consalvo de Rueda, with money supplied by the testament of the Chief Physician of Sicily, Giovanni Giacomo Lazari, a native of Gallipoli. The architects were Francesco Bischetimi and Scipione Lachibari. The stone façade was completed by Bishop Antonio della Lastra in 1696. The choir was finished and roofed, the high altar was placed, and decorations were installed by Bishop Orazio Filomarini, and dedicated on 1 May 1726. The tower received a bell in 1744, a second in 1790, and a third in 1804.

The cathedral was administered by a corporation of clergy called a Chapter. When the cathedral was in the hands of the Greeks, the Chapter was composed of two dignities (the Archpriest and the Archdeacon) and twelve Canons. Under the Roman rite, introduced by Bishop Alessio Zelodano in 1513, the Chapter received an additional four Canons, making a corporation of eighteen members. Later, it was composed of ten dignities and nine Canons. The dignities were: the Archdeacon, the Archpriest, the Dean, the Cantor, the Provost, the Treasurer, the first Primicerius, the second Primicerius, and the vice-Treasurer. In 1679 and in 1747, there were seven dignities and nine Canons.

The erection of a seminary was begun in 1751, by Bishop Serafino Branconi (1747–1759), the brother of Marchese Branconi, Secretary of State of the Kingdom of Naples. It stood next to the episcopal palace and was connected to it by internal passages. It had accommodations for thirty students. Shortly after the seminary was completed (1759), the Bishop's brother died, and the Bishop chose to resign. He reserved to himself an annual pension of 800 ducats, which he ordered to be distributed to the poor.

Bishop Antonio La Scala (27 Sep 1852 – 27 Sep 1858) conducted a diocesan synod in the cathedral from 18–20 March 1855.

=== End of the independent diocese ===
On 18 February 1984, the Vatican and the Italian State signed a new and revised concordat, which was accompanied in the next year by enabling legislation. According to the agreement, the practice of having one bishop govern two separate dioceses at the same time, aeque personaliter, was abolished. Otherwise, Nardò and Gallipoli might have shared a bishop, as the Bishop of Nardo e Gallipoli. Instead, the Vatican continued consultations that had begun under Pope John XXIII for the merging of small dioceses, especially those with personnel and financial problems, into one combined diocese. On 30 September 1986, Pope John Paul II ordered that the dioceses of Nardò and Gallipoli be merged into one diocese with one bishop, with the Latin title Dioecesis Neritonensis-Gallipolitana. The seat of the diocese was to be in Nardò, and the cathedral of Nardò was to serve as the cathedral of the merged diocese. The cathedral in Galllipoli was to become a co-cathedral, and the cathedral Chapter was to be a Capitulum Concathedralis. There was to be only one diocesan Tribunal, in Nardò, and likewise one seminary, one College of Consultors, and one Priests' Council. The territory of the new diocese was to include the territory of the former dioceses of Nardò and of Gallipoli.

== Bishops of Gallipoli ==
=== to 1700 ===
...

- Dominicus (attested 551)

...

- Joannes (attested 593, 595)
- Sabinianus (attested 599)

...

- Melchisedec (attested 787)

...

- Paulus (attested 1081)

...

- Baldricus (attested 1105)

...

- Theodosius (1158–1173)

...

- Cardinal Conrad von Wittelsbach (attested 1179) Apostolic Administrator
- Pantaleon (c.1220–c.1250)

...

- Miletius (1329–1331)
- Paulus (1331– ? )

...

- Petrus (attested 1348)

...

- Dominicus (d. 1379 ? )
- Hugolinus (1379–1383) Avignon Obedience
- Joannes da Nerone, O.Min. (1383–1396) Avignon Obedience
- Guglielmus, O.Min. (1396–c.1421)
- Angelo Corposanto, O.P. (1421–1424)
- Donato da Brindisi, O.Min. (1424–1443)
- Antonius de Neotero, O.Min. (1443–1445)
- Petrus Theodori (1445–1451?)
- Antonellus de Joannetto, O.Min. (1451–1452)
- Ludovicus Spinelli (1458–1487)
- Alfonso Spinelli (1487–1493)
- Franciscus (1493–1494)
- Alessio Celadoni di Celadonia (1494 – 1508)
- Enrique de Aragón (6 Aug 1508 – 24 Aug 1509 Died)
- Cardinal Francisco de Remolins (9 Sep 1513 – 5 Feb 1518 Died) Administrator
- Cardinal Andrea della Valle (18 Feb 1518 – 17 Oct 1524 Resigned) Administrator
- Jerónimo Muñoz (17 Oct 1524 – 1529 Resigned)
- Federico Petrucci (27 Aug 1529 – 1536 Resigned)
- Pellegrino Cibo de Turcilla (4 Aug 1536 – 1540 Died)
- Giovanni Francesco Cibo (1540 – 1575 Died)
- Alfonso Herrera, O.S.A. (1576–1585)
- Sebastián Quintero Ortiz (1586–1595 Resigned)
- Vincenzo Capece, C.R. (8 Jan 1596 – 6 Dec 1620 Died)
- Gonzalo de Rueda (23 May 1622 – 1651 Died)
- Andrea Massa (bishop) (25 Sep 1651 – 30 Dec 1654 Died)
- Giovanni Montoja de Cardona (9 Jun 1659 – 9 Mar 1667 Died)
- Antonio del Buffalo, O.F.M. (14 May 1668 – 25 Sep 1677 Died)
- Antonio Pérez de la Lastra (6 Feb 1679 – 14 Jan 1700 Died)

=== since 1700 ===
- Oronzio Filomarini, C.R. (1700–1741 Resigned)
- Antonio Maria Pescatori, O.F.M. Cap. (6 Mar 1741 – 14 Jan 1747 Died)
- Serafino Branconi, O.S.B.Celest. (1747–1759)
- Ignazio Savastano (1759–1769)
- Agostino Gervasio, O.S.A. (29 Jan 1770 – 17 Nov 1784 Resigned)
- Giovanni Giuseppe D'Anisi Dalla Croce, O.E.S.A.Descalc. (27 Feb 1792 – 13 Dec 1820 Died)
- Giuseppe Maria Botticelli, O.F.M. (19 Apr 1822 – 23 Jun 1828 Confirmed, Bishop of Lacedonia)

Sede vacante (1828–1832)

- Francesco Antonio Visocchi (2 Jul 1832 – 20 Apr 1833 Died)
- Giuseppe Maria Giove, O.F.M. (1834–1848)
- Leonardo Moccia (11 Dec 1848 – 17 Apr 1852 Died)
- Antonio La Scala (27 Sep 1852 – 27 Sep 1858 Appointed, Bishop of San Severo)
- Valerio Laspro (23 Mar 1860 – 6 May 1872 Appointed, Bishop of Lecce)
- Aniceto Ferrante, C.O. (21 Mar 1873 – 1878 Resigned)
- Gesualdo Nicola Loschirico, O.F.M. Cap. (12 May 1879 – 27 Feb 1880 Appointed, Archbishop of Acerenza e Matera)
- Enrico Carfagnini, O.F.M. (27 Feb 1880 – 24 Mar 1898 Retired)
- Gaetano Müller (20 Aug 1898 – 8 Feb 1935 Died)
- Nicola Margiotta (16 Dec 1935 – 25 Sep 1953 Appointed, Archbishop of Brindisi)
- Biagio d'Agostino (14 May 1954 – 24 Feb 1956 Appointed, Bishop of Vallo di Lucania)
- Pasquale Quaremba (20 Jun 1956 – 15 Jun 1982 Retired)
- Aldo Garzia (15 Jun 1982 – 30 Sep 1986 Appointed, Bishop of Nardò-Gallipoli)

== See also ==
- Roman Catholic Diocese of Nardò-Gallipoli
- Catholic Church in Italy

== Bibliography ==
=== Reference for bishops ===
- Gams, Pius Bonifatius (1873). Series episcoporum Ecclesiae catholicae: quotquot innotuerunt a beato Petro apostolo (in Latin). Ratisbon: Typis et Sumptibus Georgii Josephi Manz. p. 882.
- Eubel, Conradus, ed. (1913). Hierarchia catholica (in Latin). Vol. Tomus 1 (second ed.). Münster: Libreria Regensbergiana.
- Eubel, Conradus, ed. (1914). Hierarchia catholica (in Latin). Vol. Tomus 2 (second ed.). Münster: Libreria Regensbergiana.
- Gulik, Guilelmus (1923). Eubel, Conradus (ed.). Hierarchia catholica (in Latin). Vol. Tomus 3 (second ed.). Münster: Libreria Regensbergiana.
- Gauchat, Patritius (Patrice) (1935). Hierarchia catholica (in Latin). Vol. Tomus IV (1592-1667). Münster: Libraria Regensbergiana.
- Ritzler, Remigius; Sefrin, Pirminus (1952). Hierarchia catholica medii et recentis aevi V (1667-1730). Patavii: Messagero di S. Antonio.
- Ritzler, Remigius; Sefrin, Pirminus (1958). Hierarchia catholica medii et recentis aevi (in Latin). Vol. Tomus VI (1730-1799). Patavii: Messagero di S. Antonio.
- Ritzler, Remigius; Sefrin, Pirminus (1968). Hierarchia Catholica medii et recentioris aevi sive summorum pontificum, S. R. E. cardinalium, ecclesiarum antistitum series... A pontificatu Pii PP. VII (1800) usque ad pontificatum Gregorii PP. XVI (1846) (in Latin). Vol. VII. Monasterii: Libr. Regensburgiana.
- Remigius Ritzler; Pirminus Sefrin (1978). Hierarchia catholica Medii et recentioris aevi... A Pontificatu PII PP. IX (1846) usque ad Pontificatum Leonis PP. XIII (1903) (in Latin). Vol. VIII. Il Messaggero di S. Antonio.
- Pięta, Zenon (2002). Hierarchia catholica medii et recentioris aevi... A pontificatu Pii PP. X (1903) usque ad pontificatum Benedictii PP. XV (1922) (in Latin). Vol. IX. Padua: Messagero di San Antonio. ISBN 978-88-250-1000-8.

=== Studies ===
- Cappelletti, Giuseppe (1870). Le chiese d'Italia dalla loro origine sino ai nostri giorni (in Italian). Vol. Tomo vigesimo primo (21). Venezia: G. Antonelli. pp. 327–331.
- Cataldi, Nicola Maria (1848), "Nardò", in: Vincenzo D'Avino (1848). Cenni storici sulle chiese arcivescovili, vescovili, e prelatizie (nulluis) del Regno delle Due Sicilie (in Italian). Napoli: dalle stampe di Ranucci. pp. 241–260.
- Kamp, Norbert (1975). Kirche und Monarchie im staufischen Königreich Sizilien. I. Prosopographische Grundlegung: 2. Apulien und Kalabrien. München: Wilhelm Fink Verlag. (in German)
- Lanzoni, Francesco (1927). Le diocesi d'Italia dalle origini al principio del secolo VII (an. 604). Faenza: F. Lega, pp. 310, 317. (in Italian)
- Ravenna, Bartolomeo (1836). Memorie istoriche della città di Gallipoli (in Italian). Napoli: R. Miranda.
- Ughelli, Ferdinando; Coleti, Niccolò (1721). Italia sacra sive De episcopis Italiæ, et insularum adjacentium (in Latin). Vol. Tomus nonus (9). Venice: apud Sebastianum Coleti. pp. 98–110.
