= Avksenty =

Russian masculine given name

Avksenty (Russian: Авксе́нтий) is a Russian Christian male first name. The name is derived from the Greek name Auxentios, which in turn derives from the word auxanō, meaning to increase, to grow. "Avksenty" continued to be a form used by the Russian Orthodox Church, having replaced an earlier form Auksenty (Ауксе́нтий).

Its colloquial variants are Aksyon (Аксён), Aksenty (Аксе́нтий), Oksenty (Оксе́нтий), and Oksyon (Оксён). The substandard colloquial form Akenty (Аке́нтий) is also used.

The diminutives of "Avksenty" are Avksentyushka (Авксе́нтьюшка), Avksyuta (Авксю́та), Ksyuta (Ксю́та), Avksyusha (Авксю́ша), Ksyusha (Ксю́ша), Ksenya (Ксе́ня), Ksena (Ксе́на), Senya (Се́ня), Aksyonka (Аксёнка), Ksyona (Ксёна), Aksentyushka (Аксентьюшка), Aksya (А́кся), Aksyuta (Аксю́та), and Aksyusha (Аксю́ша).

The patronymics derived from "Avksenty" are "Авксе́нтиевич" (Avksentiyevich), "Авксе́нтьевич" (Avksentyevich; both masculine); and "Авксентиевна" (Avksentiyevna), "Авксентьевна" (Avksentyevna; both feminine).

== People with this first name ==
- Avksenty Stadnitsky, secular name of Metropolitan Arsenius (1862–1936), Russian orthodox prelate
- Avksenty Tsagareli (1857–1902), Georgian playwright
- Aksenty Ivanovich Poprishchin, the fictional protagonist of Nikolai Gogol's short story "Diary of a Madman"
