= Raimondo Pereda =

Italian-Swiss sculptor

Raimondo Pereda (1840 in Lugano – 1915) was an Italian-Swiss sculptor.

He was a resident of Milan but born to a Swiss-Italian family. He exhibited in Parma, in 1870, a marble statuette titled: The First Lesson. At Milan, in 1883, he exhibited another graceful statuette depicting his own son, and a marble bust titled La cuffia della nonna. Another marble sculpture was exhibited in 1886 Milan, titled Duetto, a cui faceva degno riscontro a stucco statue Una doccia. Among his works are: La fidanzata (Woman Engaged to Marry); Triestina (bust); Orphan of Mother, (marble group); La rete d' amore (Web of Love); the statuettes of Silenzio (Silence) and Dolore (Pain); Alla Chiesa; Piccolo affricano (Pygmy); Il dentista del villaggio (Village Dentist), and multiple other bas reliefs and portraits.

He was an honorary associate of the Royal Academy of Fine Arts of Milan in 1890.
