= Diego Pereda =

Spanish Roman Catholic prelate

Most Reverend Diego Pereda
- Auxiliary Bishop of Toledo
- Church: Catholic Church
- Archdiocese: Archdiocese of Toledo
- In office: 1621–1634

Orders
- Consecration: 5 Sep 1621

Personal details
- Born: 1574
- Died: 1634 (age 60) Toledo, Spain

Diego Pereda (1574-1634) was a Roman Catholic prelate who served as Auxiliary Bishop of Toledo (1621–1634).

== Biography ==
Diego Pereda was born in 1574 and ordained a priest in the Oblates of Wisdom. On 17 Mar 1621, he was appointed during the papacy of Pope Gregory XV as Auxiliary Bishop of Toledo and Titular Bishop of Sidon. He was consecrated bishop on 5 Sep 1621. He served as Auxiliary Bishop of Toledo until his death in 1634. While bishop, he was the principal co-consecrator of Juan Martínez de Peralta, Bishop of Tui (1621); and Bernardino de Sena, Bishop of Viseu (1631).
