= Vicente Enrique y Tarancón =

Spanish cardinal

His Eminence Vicente Enrique y Tarancón
- Cardinal, Archbishop of Madrid
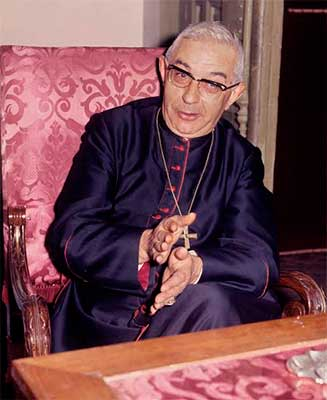
- Church: Roman Catholic
- Archdiocese: Madrid
- In office: 1971–1983
- Predecessor: Casimiro Morcillo González
- Successor: Ángel Suquía Goicoechea
- Other post: Cardinal-Priest of San Giovanni Crisostomo a Monte Sacro Alto
- Previous posts: Bishop of Solsona (1945–1964); Archbishop of Oviedo (1964–1969); Archbishop of Toledo (1969–1971)

Orders
- Ordination: 1 November 1929
- Consecration: 24 March 1946
- Created cardinal: 28 April 1969 by Paul VI
- Rank: Cardinal-Priest

Personal details
- Born: 14 May 1907 Burriana, Spain
- Died: 28 November 1994 (aged 87) Valencia, Spain
- Buried: San Isidro Church, Madrid
- Coat of arms

Seat b of the Real Academia Española
- In office 24 May 1970 – 28 November 1994
- Preceded by: Ramón Menéndez Pidal
- Succeeded by: Eliseo Álvarez-Arenas Pacheco

Styles of Vicente Enrique y Tarancón
- Reference style: His Eminence
- Spoken style: Your Eminence
- Informal style: Cardinal
- See: Madrid (emeritus)

Vicente Enrique y Tarancón (14 May 1907 – 28 November 1994), known in his country as Cardenal Tarancón or Tarancón, was a Spanish cardinal of the Roman Catholic Church who served as Archbishop of Madrid from 1971 to 1983, and as president of the Spanish Episcopal Conference from 1971 to 1981, during the difficult years of the Spanish transition to democracy. He was elevated to the cardinalate in 1969.

== Biography ==
Vicente Enrique y Tarancón was born in Burriana to Manuel Enrique Urios and his wife Vicenta Tarancón Fandos. His siblings included an older brother, Manuel, and a younger sister, Vicenta. At Vicente's baptism, his cousins Dolores Enrique Planelles and Vicente Ríos Enrique acted as his godparents. The baptismal register was later destroyed in a fire of the parochial archive in August 1936. After completing his initial studies at Colegio de la Consolación in Burriana, he attended the seminaries in Tortosa and Valencia. Tarancón was ordained to the priesthood by Bishop Félix Bilbao y Ugarriza on 1 November 1929 in Tortosa, and then did pastoral work in the Diocese of Tortosa until 1933. He worked with Catholic Action in the Diocese of Madrid from 1933 to 1938, when he resumed his pastoral ministry in Tortosa.

On 25 November 1945, Enrique y Tarancón was appointed Bishop of Solsona by Pope Pius XII. He received his episcopal consecration on 24 March 1946 from Bishop Manuel Moll y Salord, with Bishops Casimiro Morcillo González and Juan Hervás y Benet serving as co-consecrators. Tarancón was made secretary of the Spanish Episcopal Conference in February 1953, and attended the Second Vatican Council from 1962 to 1965. He was later named Archbishop of Oviedo on 12 April 1964, and Archbishop of Toledo on 30 January 1969. As Archbishop of Toledo, Tarancón thus also served as Primate of Spain.

Pope Paul VI created him Cardinal Priest of S. Giovanni Crisostomo a Monte Sacro Alto in the consistory of 28 April 1969. The Spanish primate was made Apostolic Administrator of Madrid-Alcalá from 30 May 1971, after the death of archbishop Morcillo, until being appointed Archbishop of Madrid on 3 December. He also acted as President of the Spanish Episcopal Conference the same year (also to finish the three-years term of his predecessor Morcillo) before being formally elected in February 1972.

In this position, he had to confront the difficult last years of the Francoist State and of caudillo Francisco Franco, in which relationships between Government and Church were tense. As a close ally of Pope Paul VI, Tarancón was seen as an enemy by the most radical far-right Francoist elements. Some of them made popular the cry "Tarancón al paredón" ("Tarancón up against the wall", meaning to be executed by firing squad) during the funeral of prime minister Admiral Luis Carrero Blanco, assassinated in Madrid by Basque terrorist organization ETA on 20 December 1973. Only one week after the death of Franco, Tarancón pronounced on 27 November 1975 an historical homily before King Juan Carlos I at the medieval church of Los Jerónimos: there the Cardinal asked him to be "the king of all Spaniards, and not only of part of them". During the first years of the Spanish Transition, Tarancón proved to be dialogant with all social and political forces.

Tarancón was one of the cardinal electors who participated in the conclaves of August and October 1978, which selected Popes John Paul I and John Paul II respectively. He resigned as Madrid's archbishop on 12 April 1983.

The Cardinal died in Valencia, at age 87. He is buried in the Collegiate of San Isidro, in Madrid.

Catholic Church titles
Preceded by Valentín Comellas y Santamaría	Bishop of Solsona; 1945–1964	Succeeded by José Bascuñana y López
Preceded by Francisco Lauzurica y Torralba	Archbishop of Oviedo; 1964–1969	Succeeded by Gabino Díaz Merchán
Preceded by Enrique Pla y Deniel	Archbishop of Toledo; 1969–1971	Succeeded by Marcelo Gonzalez Martin
Preceded by Casimiro Morcillo Gonzalez	Archbishop of Madrid; 1971–1983	Succeeded by Angel Suquía Goicoechea
