= Suero I (bishop of Coria) =

Spanish prelate

Suero I (died 1168) was a twelfth-century Spanish prelate. He was the abbot of Santa María de Nogales before being promoted bishop of the Diocese of Coria in 1155. The diocese seems to have been vacant since 1151 and sent no bishop to either the council of Salamanca (1154) or Valladolid (1155). It is possible that the visiting Papal legate Hyacinth ordered the king to appoint a bishop. The previous bishop, Íñigo Navarro, had also been a monk.

Coria was a poor frontier bishopric when Suero entered it. The lordship of the city had been divided equally after its reconquest in 1142 between the king, the bishop and the metropolitan (the Archbishop of Santiago de Compostela). In 1157, on the death of King Alfonso VII, the diocese went to León in the division of the kingdom and thus gained another frontier, this time with Castile. In 1163 the new king, Ferdinand II, gave exclusive lordship in the city to Santiago, but in 1168 transferred it again, this time to the Knights Templar, probably for reasons of military defence. In 1166 Ferdinand conquered the cities of Alcántara and Cáceres and added them to the diocese and lordship of the bishop of Coria. These new possessions, along with all earlier acquisitions, were confirmed by Pope Alexander III at Suero's request in 1168.

Suero died in 1168 and was succeeded the next year (1169) by Peter I, a shadowy figure who died between 1174 and 1177, leaving the see vacant for another four years before Arnold I was appointed in 1181.

== Bibliography ==
- A. Andrés. "Suero, obispo de Coria, (1156–1168)". Hispania Sacra 13 (1960), 397–400.
- E. Escobar Prieto. "Antigüedad y límites del obispado de Coria". Boletín de la Real Academia de la Historia 61 (1912), 331–33.
