= Siege of Coria =

Siege of Coria may refer to:

- Siege of Coria (1138)
- Siege of Coria (1142)
