= Roman Catholic Diocese of Caceres =

Roman Catholic Diocese of Caceres may refer to the following Catholic jurisdictions :

- Diocese of Coria-Caceres, in Spain
- the former Diocese of Caceres, in the Philippines (now an Archdiocese)
