= Juan Queipo de Llano y Valdés =

Juan Queipo de Llano y Valdés may refer to:

- Juan Queipo de Llano y Valdés (bishop of Guadix) (died 1643), Spanish Roman Catholic bishop
- Juan Queipo de Llano y Valdés (archbishop of La Plata o Charcas) (1635–1713), South American Roman Catholic bishop
