= Francisco Antonio Sarmiento de Luna y Enríquez =

Spanish Roman Catholic prelate

Most Reverend Francisco Antonio Sarmiento de Luna y Enríquez
- Bishop of Coria
- Church: Catholic Church
- Diocese: Diocese of Coria
- In office: 1675–1683
- Predecessor: Bernardino León de la Rocha
- Successor: Juan de Porras y Atienza
- Previous posts: Bishop of Michoacán (1668–1673); Bishop of Almería (1673–1675)

Orders
- Consecration: 5 January 1670 by Francisco Verdín y Molina

Personal details
- Born: 1615 Seville, Spain
- Died: 21 July 1683 (aged 67–68) Coria, Cáceres, Spain

Francisco Antonio Sarmiento de Luna y Enríquez, O.S.A. (1615 – 21 July 1683) was a Roman Catholic prelate who served as Bishop of Coria (1675–1683), Bishop of Almería (1673–1675), and Bishop of Michoacán (1668–1673).

== Biography ==
Francisco Antonio Sarmiento de Luna y Enríquez was born in Seville, Spain in 1615 and ordained a priest in the Order of Saint Augustine . On 12 November 1668, he was appointed during the papacy of Pope Clement IX as Bishop of Michoacán. On 5 January 1670, he was consecrated bishop by Francisco Verdín y Molina, Bishop of Guadalajara. On 25 September 1673, he was appointed during the papacy of Pope Clement X as Bishop of Almería. On 27 May 1675, he was appointed during the papacy of Pope Clement X as Bishop of Coria. He served as Bishop of Coria until his death on 21 July 1683.

While bishop, he was the principal consecrator of Martín de Espinosa y Monzón, Bishop of Comayagua (1673) and Antonio Ibarra, Bishop of Almería (1675).

== External links and additional sources ==
- Cheney, David M. "Archdiocese of Morelia". Catholic-Hierarchy.org. (for Chronology of Bishops) ^{[self-published]}
- Chow, Gabriel. "Metropolitan Archdiocese of Morelia (Mexico)". GCatholic.org. (for Chronology of Bishops) ^{[self-published]}
- Cheney, David M. "Diocese of Coria-Cáceres". Catholic-Hierarchy.org. (for Chronology of Bishops) ^{[self-published]}
- Chow, Gabriel. "Diocese of Coria-Caceres (Spain)". GCatholic.org. (for Chronology of Bishops) ^{[self-published]}

Catholic Church titles
Preceded by Payo Afán Enríquez de Ribera Manrique de Lara	Bishop of Michoacán; 1668–1673	Succeeded by Francisco Verdín y Molina
Preceded by Rodrigo de Mandia y Parga	Bishop of Almería; 1673–1675	Succeeded by Antonio Ibarra
Preceded by Bernardino León de la Rocha	Bishop of Coria; 1675–1683	Succeeded by Juan de Porras y Atienza
