= Juan de Porras y Atienza =

Spanish Roman Catholic prelate

Most Reverend Juan de Porras y Atienza
- Bishop of Coria
- Church: Catholic Church
- Diocese: Diocese of Coria
- In office: 1684–1704
- Predecessor: Francisco Antonio Sarmiento de Luna y Enríquez
- Successor: Miguel Pérez Lara
- Previous post: Bishop of Ceuta (1681–1684)

Orders
- Ordination: 1653
- Consecration: 1681 by Ambrosio Ignacio Spínola y Guzmán

Personal details
- Born: 6 January 1627 Cabra, Spain
- Died: 28 July 1704 (aged 77) Coria, Cáceres, Spain

Juan de Porras y Atienza (6 January 1627 – 28 July 1704) was a Roman Catholic prelate who served as Bishop of Coria (1684–1704) and Bishop of Ceuta (1681–1684).

== Biography ==
Juan de Porras y Atienza was ordained a priest in 1653. On 12 May 1681, he was appointed during the papacy of Pope Innocent XI as Bishop of Ceuta. In 1681, he was consecrated bishop by Ambrosio Ignacio Spínola y Guzmán, Archbishop of Seville, with James Lynch, Archbishop of Tuam, and Bishop Antonio Ibarra, Bishop of Cádiz, serving as co-consecrators. On 24 April 1684, he was appointed during the papacy of Pope Innocent XI as Bishop of Coria. He served as Bishop of Coria until his death on 28 July 1704. While bishop, he was the principal co-consecrator of Pedro de Lepe Orantes, Bishop of Calahorra y La Calzada (1686).

== External links and additional sources ==
- Cheney, David M. "Diocese of Coria-Cáceres". Catholic-Hierarchy.org. (for Chronology of Bishops) ^{[self-published]}
- Chow, Gabriel. "Diocese of Coria-Caceres (Spain)". GCatholic.org. (for Chronology of Bishops) ^{[self-published]}

Catholic Church titles
Preceded by Antonio Medina Cachón y Ponce de León	Bishop of Ceuta; 1681–1684	Succeeded by Luis de Ayllón
Preceded by Francisco Antonio Sarmiento de Luna y Enríquez	Bishop of Coria; 1684–1704	Succeeded by Miguel Pérez Lara
