= Arcadiopolis (disambiguation) =

Arcadiopolis or Arkadiopolis (Greek: Αρκαδιούπολις) may refer to the following ancient cities, named after the Roman emperor Arcadius, both in modern Turkey :

- Arcadiopolis in Asia, at the modern site of Tire
- Arcadiopolis in Europa, at the modern site of Lüleburgaz
