= Gonzalo Bravo de Grajera =

Spanish Roman Catholic prelate

Most Reverend Gonzalo Bravo de Grajera
- Bishop of Coria
- Church: Catholic Church
- Diocese: Diocese of Coria
- In office: 1671–1672
- Predecessor: Antonio Fernández del Campo Angulo y Velasco
- Successor: Baltasar de los Reyes
- Previous post: Bishop of Palencia (1665–1671)

Orders
- Consecration: May 1666 by Miguel Pérez Cevallos

Personal details
- Born: 1604 Arroyo de San Serván, Spain
- Died: 30 August 1672 (age 68) Coria, Cáceres, Spain

Gonzalo Bravo de Grajera (1604 – 30 August 1672) was a Roman Catholic prelate who served as Bishop of Coria (1671–1672) and Bishop of Palencia (1665–1671).

== Biography ==
Gonzalo Bravo de Grajera was born in Arroyo de San Serván, Spain in 1604. On 27 June 1665, he was appointed during the papacy of Pope Alexander VII as Bishop of Palencia. In May 1666, he was consecrated bishop by Miguel Pérez Cevallos, Titular Bishop of Arcadiopolis in Asia. On 28 September 1671, he was appointed during the papacy of Pope Clement X as Bishop of Coria. He served as Bishop of Coria until his death on 30 August 1672.

== External links and additional sources ==
- Cheney, David M. "Diocese of Palencia". Catholic-Hierarchy.org. (for Chronology of Bishops) ^{[self-published]}
- Chow, Gabriel. "Diocese of Palencia (Spain)". GCatholic.org. (for Chronology of Bishops) ^{[self-published]}
- Cheney, David M. "Diocese of Coria-Cáceres". Catholic-Hierarchy.org. (for Chronology of Bishops) ^{[self-published]}
- Chow, Gabriel. "Diocese of Coria-Caceres (Spain)". GCatholic.org. (for Chronology of Bishops) ^{[self-published]}

Catholic Church titles
Preceded by Enrique Peralta y Cárdenas	Bishop of Palencia; 1665–1671	Succeeded by Juan Molino Navarrete
Preceded by Antonio Fernández del Campo Angulo y Velasco	Bishop of Coria; 1671–1672	Succeeded by Baltasar de los Reyes
