= Baltasar de los Reyes =

Spanish Roman Catholic prelate

Most Reverend Baltasar de los Reyes
- Bishop of Coria
- Church: Catholic Church
- Diocese: Diocese of Coria
- In office: 1673
- Predecessor: Gonzalo Bravo de Grajera
- Successor: Bernardino León de la Rocha
- Previous post: Bishop of Orense (1668–1673)

Orders
- Consecration: 6 May 1668 by Vitaliano Visconti

Personal details
- Born: 1606 Riaza, Spain
- Died: 5 May 1673 (age 67) Coria, Cáceres, Spain

Baltasar de los Reyes, O.S.H., (1606 – 5 May 1673) was a Roman Catholic prelate who served as Bishop of Coria (1673) and Bishop of Orense (1668–1673).

== Biography ==
Baltasar de los Reyes was born in Riaza, Spain, in 1606 and ordained a priest in the Order of Saint Jerome. On 30 January 1668, he was appointed during the papacy of Pope Clement IX as Bishop of Ourense. On 6 May 1668, he was consecrated bishop by Vitaliano Visconti, Titular Archbishop of Ephesus, with Egidio Colonna (patriarch), Titular Archbishop of Amasea, and Francisco de Rojas-Borja y Artés, Bishop of Ávila, serving as co-consecrators. On 30 January 1673, he was appointed during the papacy of Pope Clement X as Bishop of Coria. He served as Bishop of Coria until his death on 5 May 1673. Don Diego Ros de Medrano succeeded him as the Bishop of Ourense on 29 May 1673.

== External links and additional sources ==
- Cheney, David M. "Diocese of Coria-Cáceres". Catholic-Hierarchy.org. (for Chronology of Bishops) ^{[self-published]}
- Chow, Gabriel. "Diocese of Coria-Caceres (Spain)". GCatholic.org. (for Chronology of Bishops) ^{[self-published]}
- Cheney, David M. "Diocese of Orense". Catholic-Hierarchy.org. (for Chronology of Bishops) ^{[self-published]}
- Chow, Gabriel. "Diocese of Orense (Spain)". GCatholic.org. (for Chronology of Bishops) ^{[self-published]}

Catholic Church titles
Preceded by Francisco Rodríguez Castañón	Bishop of Orense; 1668–1673	Succeeded by Diego Ros de Medrano
Preceded by Gonzalo Bravo de Grajera	Bishop of Coria; 1673	Succeeded by Bernardino León de la Rocha
