= Juan Roco Campofrío =

Spanish Roman Catholic prelate

Most Reverend Juan Roco Campofrío
- Bishop of Coria
- Church: Catholic Church
- Diocese: Diocese of Coria
- In office: 1632–1635
- Predecessor: Jerónimo Ruiz Camargo
- Successor: Antonio González Acevedo
- Previous posts: Bishop of Zamora (1625–1627); Bishop of Badajoz (1627–1632)

Orders
- Consecration: 29 June 1625 by Giulio Cesare Sacchetti

Personal details
- Born: 8 June 1565 Alcántara, Spain
- Died: 16 September 1635 (age 70) Coria, Cáceres, Spain

Juan Roco Campofrío (8 June 1565 – 16 September 1635) was a Roman Catholic prelate who served as Bishop of Coria (1632–1635), Bishop of Badajoz (1627–1632), and Bishop of Zamora (1625–1627).

== Biography ==
Juan Roco Campofrío was born in Alcántara, Spain and ordained a priest in the Order of Saint Benedict. On 17 March 1625, he was appointed during the papacy of Pope Urban VIII as Bishop of Zamora. On 29 June 1625, he was consecrated bishop by Giulio Cesare Sacchetti, Bishop of Gravina, with Juan Bravo Lagunas, Bishop of Ugento, and Antonio de Gouvea, Titular Bishop of Cyrene, serving as co-consecrators. On 5 July 1627, he was appointed during the papacy of Pope Urban VIII as Bishop of Badajoz. On 8 March 1632, he was appointed during the papacy of Pope Urban VIII as Bishop of Coria. He served as Bishop of Coria until his death on 16 September 1635.

== See also ==
- Catholic Church in Spain

== External links and additional sources ==
- Cheney, David M. "Diocese of Coria-Cáceres". Catholic-Hierarchy.org. (for Chronology of Bishops) ^{[self-published]}
- Chow, Gabriel. "Diocese of Coria-Caceres (Spain)". GCatholic.org. (for Chronology of Bishops) ^{[self-published]}
- Cheney, David M. "Diocese of Zamora". Catholic-Hierarchy.org. (for Chronology of Bishops) ^{[self-published]}
- Chow, Gabriel. "Diocese of Zamora (Spain)". GCatholic.org. (for Chronology of Bishops) ^{[self-published]}
- Cheney, David M. "Archdiocese of Mérida–Badajoz". Catholic-Hierarchy.org. (for Chronology of Bishops) ^{[self-published]}
- Chow, Gabriel. "Metropolitan Archdiocese of Mérida–Badajoz (Spain)". GCatholic.org. (for Chronology of Bishops) ^{[self-published]}

Catholic Church titles
Preceded by Plácido Tosantos Medina	Bishop of Zamora; 1625–1627	Succeeded by Juan Pérez de la Serna
Preceded by Pedro Fernández Zorrilla	Bishop of Badajoz; 1627–1632	Succeeded by Gabriel Ortiz Sotomayor
Preceded by Jerónimo Ruiz Camargo	Bishop of Coria; 1632–1635	Succeeded by Antonio González Acevedo
