= Juan López (bishop of Coria) =

Spanish Roman Catholic prelate

Most Reverend Juan López
- Church: Catholic Church
- In office: 1499–1501
- Predecessor: César de Borja
- Successor: François Busleiden

Personal details
- Died: 5 August 1501 Coria, Cáceres, Spain

Juan López (died 5 August 1501) was a Roman Catholic prelate who served as Bishop of Coria (1499–1501).

== Biography ==
In 1499, Juan López was appointed during the papacy of Pope Alexander VI as Bishop of Coria. He served as Bishop of Coria until his death on 5 August 1501.

== External links and additional sources ==
- Cheney, David M. "Diocese of Coria-Cáceres". Catholic-Hierarchy.org. (for Chronology of Bishops) ^{[self-published]}
- Chow, Gabriel. "Diocese of Coria-Caceres (Spain)". GCatholic.org. (for Chronology of Bishops) ^{[self-published]}

Catholic Church titles
Preceded by César de Borja	Bishop of Coria; 1499–1501	Succeeded by François Busleiden
