= Antonio González Acevedo =

Spanish Roman Catholic prelate

Most Reverend Antonio González Acevedo
- Bishop of Coria
- Church: Catholic Church
- Diocese: Diocese of Coria
- In office: 1637–1642
- Predecessor: Juan Roco Campofrío
- Successor: Juan Queipo de Llano y Valdés

Orders
- Consecration: 2 April 1634 by Miguel Avellán

Personal details
- Died: 14 March 1642 Coria, Spain

Antonio González Acevedo (died 14 March 1642) was a Roman Catholic prelate who served as Bishop of Coria (1637–1642) and Bishop of Almería (1633–1637).

== Biography ==
Antonio González Acevedo was ordained a priest on 17 December 1605. On 19 December 1633, he was appointed during the papacy of Pope Urban VIII as Bishop of Almería. On 2 April 1634, he was consecrated bishop by Miguel Avellán, Titular Bishop of Siriensis, with Timoteo Pérez Vargas, Bishop of Ispahan, and Cristóforo Chrisostome Carletti, Bishop of Termia, serving as co-consecrators. On 5 October 1637, he was appointed during the papacy of Pope Urban VIII as Bishop of Coria. He served as Bishop of Coria until his death on 14 March 1642.

While bishop, he was the principal co-consecrator of Juan Vélez de Valdivielso, Bishop of Lugo (1636).

== External links and additional sources ==
- Cheney, David M. "Diocese of Coria-Cáceres". Catholic-Hierarchy.org. (for Chronology of Bishops) ^{[self-published]}
- Chow, Gabriel. "Diocese of Coria-Caceres (Spain)". GCatholic.org. (for Chronology of Bishops) ^{[self-published]}

Catholic Church titles
Preceded by Bartolomé Santos de Risoba	Bishop of Almería; 1633–1637	Succeeded by José Valle de la Cerda
Preceded by Juan Roco Campofrío	Bishop of Coria; 1637–1642	Succeeded by Juan Queipo de Llano y Valdés
