= Bernardino León de la Rocha =

Spanish Roman Catholic prelate

Most Reverend Bernardino León de la Rocha
- Bishop of Coria
- Church: Catholic Church
- Diocese: Diocese of Coria
- In office: 1673–1675
- Predecessor: Baltasar de los Reyes
- Successor: Francisco Antonio Sarmiento de Luna y Enríquez
- Previous post: Bishop of Tui (1669–1673)

Orders
- Ordination: 13 March 1656
- Consecration: 1669 by Antonio Fernández del Campo Angulo y Velasco

Personal details
- Born: 4 April 1620 Badajoz, Spain
- Died: 4 January 1675 (age 54) Coria, Cáceres, Spain

Bernardino León de la Rocha (4 April 1620 – 4 January 1675) was a Roman Catholic prelate who served as Bishop of Coria (1673–1675) and Bishop of Tui (1669–1673).

== Biography ==
Bernardino León de la Rocha was born in Badajoz, Spain on 4 April 1620 and ordained a priest on 13 March 1656. On 17 March 1669, he was selected by the King of Spain and confirmed by Pope Clement IX on 15 July 1669 as Bishop of Tui. In 1669, he was consecrated bishop by Antonio Fernández del Campo Angulo y Velasco, Bishop of Coria, with Antonio Peña Hermosa, Bishop of Jaén, serving as co-consecrator. On 25 September 1673, he was appointed during the papacy of Pope Clement X as Bishop of Coria. He served as Bishop of Coria until his death on 4 January 1675.

== External links and additional sources ==
- Cheney, David M. "Diocese of Tui-Vigo". Catholic-Hierarchy.org. (for Chronology of Bishops) ^{[self-published]}
- Chow, Gabriel. "Diocese of Tui-Vigo (Spain)". GCatholic.org. (for Chronology of Bishops) ^{[self-published]}
- Cheney, David M. "Diocese of Coria-Cáceres". Catholic-Hierarchy.org. (for Chronology of Bishops) ^{[self-published]}
- Chow, Gabriel. "Diocese of Coria-Caceres (Spain)". GCatholic.org. (for Chronology of Bishops) ^{[self-published]}

Catholic Church titles
Preceded by Antonio Fernández del Campo Angulo y Velasco	Bishop of Tui; 1669–1673	Succeeded by Simón García Pedrejón
Preceded by Baltasar de los Reyes	Bishop of Coria; 1673–1675	Succeeded by Francisco Antonio Sarmiento de Luna y Enríquez
