= Patrick Foley =

Roman Catholic bishop (1858–1926)

Most Reverend Dr. Patrick Foley
- Bishop in Kildare and Leighlin
- Province: Kildare
- Diocese: Kildare and Leighlin
- Installed: 1896
- Term ended: 1926 (his death)
- Predecessor: Rev James Lynch, CM
- Successor: Dr Matthew Cullen
- Previous posts: President, Carlow College

Orders
- Ordination: 1881

Personal details
- Born: 8 March 1858 Old Leighlin, County Carlow, Ireland
- Died: 24 July 1926 Carlow, County Carlow, Ireland
- Denomination: Roman Catholic
- Education: Carlow College

Patrick Foley (8 March 1858 – 24 July 1926) was a Roman Catholic professor, priest and Bishop of Kildare and Leighlin.

== Biography ==
Foley was born in 1858 at Mensal Lodge, Old Leighlin, County Carlow, the fourth son of Patrick Foley and Mary Delaney. He was educated initially at Leighlinbridge National School, then at the Lay College and the Seminary of St Patrick's, Carlow College. He graduated with a B.A. from the University of London Carlow College being affiliated to it at the time.

Following ordination he was appointed professor at Carlow College in 1881. In 1886, he became vice-president and in 1892 President of Carlow College, during his tenure the Seminary expanded and all Lay Students were moved to St Mary's Knockbeg College. During his time in the College he was awarded the degree of Doctor of Divinity. His successor as President of Carlow College was his brother Monsignor John Foley.

In 1895, he was appointed coadjutor of the Diocese of Kildare and Leighlin and one year later, upon on the death of Bishop James Lynch he was appointed Bishop of Kildare and Leighlin. In 1905, he was appointed commissioner of education. In 1908, he was appointed to the Board of the National University in Dublin. He died in 1926 and is buried in the grounds of the Cathedral of the Assumption, Carlow.

== See also ==
- Catholic Church in Ireland

Catholic Church titles
Preceded by Rev. James Lynch CM	Bishop of Kildare and Leighlin; 1896–1926	Succeeded by Dr. Matthew Cullen
