= Rodrigo de Mandiá y Parga =

Spanish Roman Catholic prelate

Most Reverend Rodrigo de Mandiá y Parga
- Church: Catholic Church
- Archdiocese: Diocese of Astorga
- In office: 1672–1674
- Predecessor: Matías de Moratinos y Santos
- Successor: Diego de Silva y Pacheco
- Previous posts: Bishop of Almería (1663–1672); Auxiliary Bishop of Toledo (1652–1663)

Personal details
- Born: 1606 Ferrol, Spain
- Died: 20 October 1674 (age 68) Astorga, Spain

Rodrigo de Mandiá y Parga (1606 – 20 October 1674) was a Roman Catholic prelate who served as Bishop of Astorga (1672–1674), Bishop of Almería (1663–1672), and Auxiliary Bishop of Toledo (1652-1663).

== Biography ==
Rodrigo de Mandiá y Parga was born in Ferrol, Spain in 1606. On 14 October 1652, he was appointed during the papacy of Pope Innocent X as Auxiliary Bishop of Toledo and Titular Bishop of Siriensis. On 9 April 1663, he was appointed during the papacy of Pope Alexander VII as Bishop of Almería. On 12 December 1672, he was appointed during the papacy of Pope Clement X as Bishop of Astorga. He served as Bishop of Astorga until his death on 20 October 1674. While bishop, he was the principal consecrator of Principal Consecrator Carlo Bonelli, Titular Archbishop of Corinthus.

== External links and additional sources ==
- Cheney, David M. "Diocese of Astorga". Catholic-Hierarchy.org. (for Chronology of Bishops) ^{[self-published]}
- Chow, Gabriel. "Diocese of Astorga (Spain)". GCatholic.org. (for Chronology of Bishops) ^{[self-published]}

Catholic Church titles
Preceded by Alfonso Pérez de Humanares	Bishop of Almería; 1663–1672	Succeeded by Francisco Antonio Sarmiento de Luna y Enríquez
Preceded by Matías de Moratinos y Santos	Bishop of Astorga; 1672–1674	Succeeded by Diego de Silva y Pacheco
