= James Lynch (bishop of Kildare and Leighlin) =

Irish clergyman (1807–1896)

The Most Reverend James Lynch C.M.
- Bishop of Kildare and Leighlin
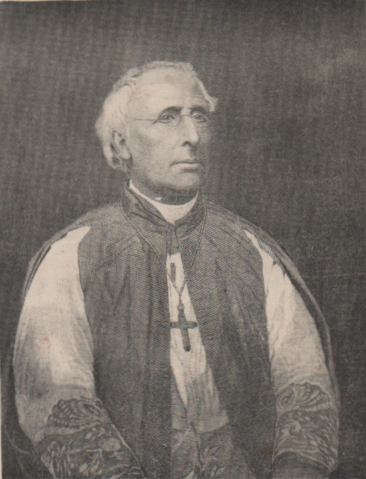
- Church: Roman Catholic
- Diocese: Kildare and Leighlin
- In office: 1888–1896
- Predecessor: James Walshe
- Successor: Patrick Foley
- Previous posts: Coadjutor Bishop of Kildare and Leighlin (1869–88); Titular bishop of Arcadiopolis in Asia (1866–88) Coadjutor Vicar Apostolic of the Western District (1866–69)

Orders
- Ordination: 18 June 1833 by Daniel Murray
- Consecration: 4 November 1866 by William Keane

Personal details
- Born: 23 January 1807 Dublin, Ireland
- Died: 19 December 1896 (aged 89) Blackrock, Dublin, Ireland

James Lynch, C.M. (23 January 1807 – 19 December 1896) was an Irish clergyman who held a number of high offices in the Roman Catholic Church in Scotland and Ireland.

He was born on 23 January 1807 in Dublin, Ireland. He was ordained a priest in the Congregation of the Mission on 18 June 1833. He was appointed Coadjutor Vicar Apostolic of Western District in Scotland and Titular Bishop of Arcadiopolis in Asia on 31 August 1866. He was consecrated on 13 April 1866. His principal consecrator was Bishop William Keane of Cloyne, and his principal co-consecrators were Bishop Laurence Gillooly of Elpin and Bishop Michael O'Hea of Ross. Three years later, Lynch was appointed Coadjutor Bishop of the Diocese of Kildare and Leighlin on 13 April 1869. He succeeded Diocesan Bishop of Kildare and Leighlin on 5 March 1888. He died in office on 19 December 1896, aged 89 years old.

Catholic Church titles
Preceded by James Walshe	Bishop of Kildare and Leighlin; 1888–1896	Succeeded by Patrick Foley
