= Miguel Pérez Cevallos =

Spanish Roman Catholic prelate

Most Reverend Miguel Pérez Cevallos
- Auxiliary Bishop of Toledo; Titular Bishop of Arcadiopolis in Asia
- Church: Catholic Church
- Archdiocese: Archdiocese of Toledo
- In office: 1660–1681

Personal details
- Died: 2 October 1681 Toledo, Spain

Miguel Pérez Cevallos (died 2 October 1681) was a Roman Catholic prelate who served as Auxiliary Bishop of Toledo (1660–1681).

== Biography ==
On 21 January 1660, Miguel Pérez Cevallos, he was appointed during the papacy of Pope Alexander VII as Auxiliary Bishop of Toledo and Titular Bishop of Arcadiopolis in Asia. On 3 October 1660, he was consecrated bishop. He served as Auxiliary Bishop of Toledo until his death on 2 October 1681.

== Episcopal succession ==
Episcopal succession of Miguel Pérez Cevallos

While bishop, he was the principal consecrator of:

- Francisco Ocampo, Titular Bishop of Amyclae (1660);
- Francisco Rodríguez Castañón, Bishop of Orense (1664);
- Gonzalo Bravo de Grajera, Bishop of Palencia (1666);
- Diego Ros de Medrano, Bishop of Orense (1673);
- Juan Herrero Jaraba, Bishop of Badajoz (1678);

and the principal co-consecrator of:

- Antonio del Buffalo, Auxiliary Bishop of Toledo (1662);
- Antonio Rodríguez Castañon, Bishop of Ciudad Rodrigo (1662);
- Francisco de Seijas Losada, Bishop of Valladolid (1664);
- Matías de Moratinos y Santos, Bishop of Lugo (1664);
- Antonio Fernández del Campo Angulo y Velasco, Bishop of Tui (1666);
- Juan Álvarez Osorio, Bishop of León (1673);
- Simón García Pedrejón, Bishop of Tui (1674);
- Antonio Ibarra, Bishop of Almería (1675);
- Agustín Antolínez, Bishop of Badajoz (1676);
- Juan de Isla, Bishop of Cádiz (1677); and
- Diego de Baños y Sotomayor, Bishop of Santa Marta (1677).
