= Jerónimo Ruiz Camargo =

Spanish Roman Catholic prelate (died 1633)

Most Reverend Jerónimo Ruiz Camargo
- Bishop of Córdoba
- Church: Catholic Church
- Diocese: Diocese of Córdoba
- In office: 1632–1633
- Predecessor: Cristóbal de Lobera y Torres
- Successor: Domingo Pimentel Zúñiga
- Previous posts: Bishop of Ciudad Rodrigo (1613–1622); Bishop of Coria (1622–1632),

Orders
- Consecration: 1614 by Juan Beltrán Guevara y Figueroa

Personal details
- Died: 3 January 1633

Jerónimo Ruiz Camargo (died 3 January 1633) was a Roman Catholic prelate who served as Bishop of Córdoba (1632–1633), Bishop of Coria (1622–1632), and Bishop of Ciudad Rodrigo (1613–1622).

== Biography ==
On 12 August 1613, Jerónimo Ruiz Camargo was appointed during the papacy of Pope Paul V as Bishop of Ciudad Rodrigo. In 1614, he was consecrated bishop by Juan Beltrán Guevara y Figueroa, Bishop of Badajoz. On 23 May 1622, he was appointed during the papacy of Pope Gregory XV as Bishop of Coria. On 16 February 1632, he was appointed during the papacy of Pope Urban VIII as Bishop of Córdoba. He served as Bishop of Córdoba until his death on 3 January 1633.

== External links and additional sources ==
- Cheney, David M. "Diocese of Ciudad Rodrigo". Catholic-Hierarchy.org. (for Chronology of Bishops) ^{[self-published]}
- Chow, Gabriel. "Diocese of Ciudad Rodrigo". GCatholic.org. (for Chronology of Bishops) ^{[self-published]}
- Cheney, David M. "Diocese of Coria-Cáceres". Catholic-Hierarchy.org. (for Chronology of Bishops) ^{[self-published]}
- Chow, Gabriel. "Diocese of Coria-Caceres (Spain)". GCatholic.org. (for Chronology of Bishops) ^{[self-published]}
- Cheney, David M. "Diocese of Córdoba". Catholic-Hierarchy.org. (for Chronology of Bishops) ^{[self-published]}
- Chow, Gabriel. "Diocese of Córdoba". GCatholic.org. (for Chronology of Bishops) ^{[self-published]}

Catholic Church titles
Preceded by Antonio Idiáquez Manrique	Bishop of Ciudad Rodrigo; 1613–1622	Succeeded by Francisco de Arriba
Preceded by Pedro Carvajal Girón de Loaysa	Bishop of Coria; 1622–1632	Succeeded by Juan Roco Campofrío
Preceded by Cristóbal de Lobera y Torres	Bishop of Córdoba; 1632–1633	Succeeded by Domingo Pimentel Zúñiga
