= Siege of Coria (1138) =

12th-century battle of the Reconquista

- Part of the Reconquista
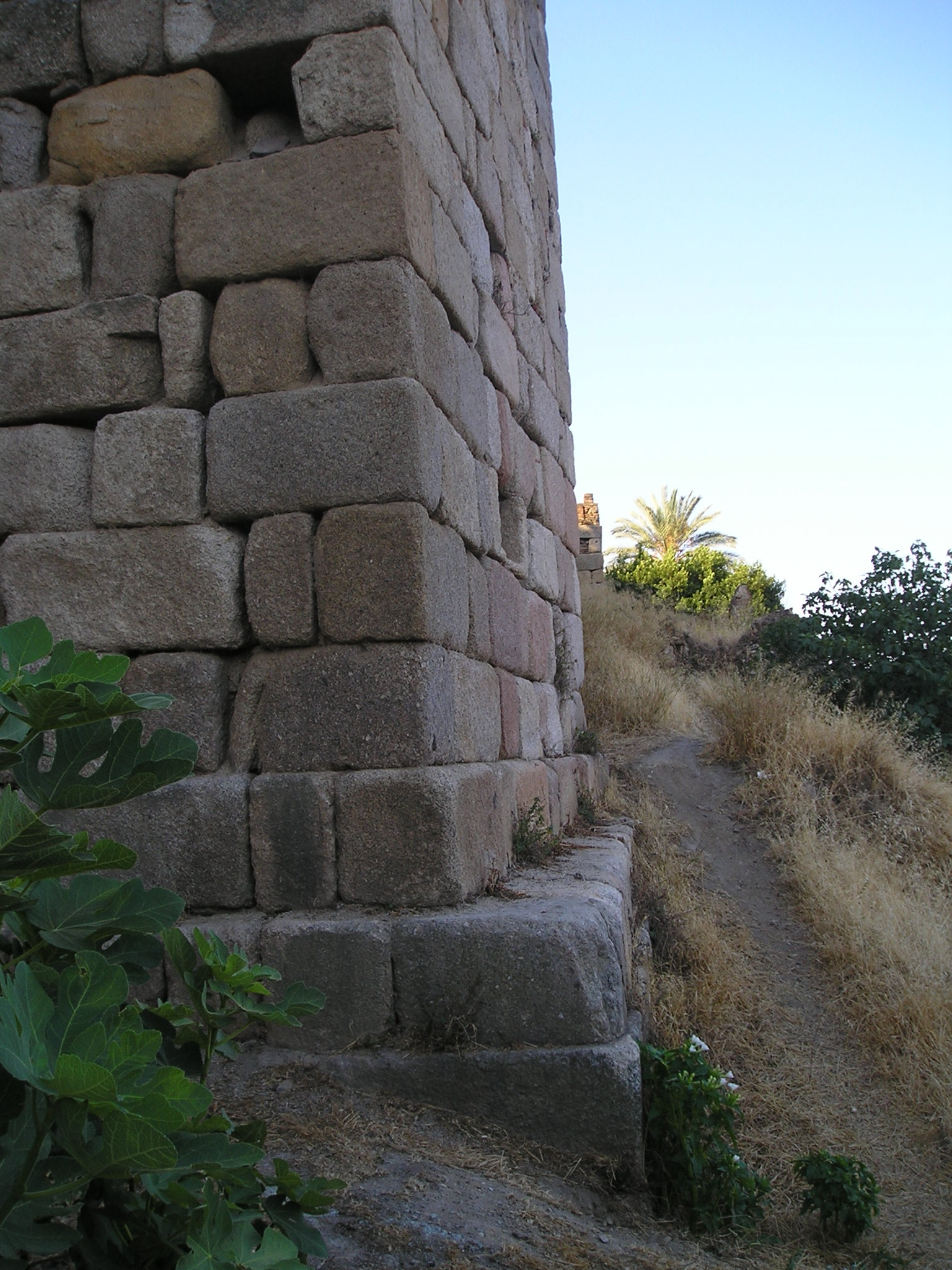
- The wall of Coria as it was when it kept out Alfonso in 1138
Date	July 1138
Location	Coria, Cáceres
Result	Almoravid victory

Belligerents
Kingdom of León–Castile	Almoravid Empire

Commanders and leaders
Alfonso VII of León and Castile; Rodrigo Martínez †	Unknown

The siege of Coria in July 1138 was the first and shorter of two attempts by Alfonso VII of León to take the city of Coria in Muslim Spain. Coria had previously been reconquered in 1079 by Alfonso VI, but was lost to the Almoravids not long after Alfonso's death in 1109. On the heels of a successful razzia (raid) deep into Islamic al-Andalus, Alfonso VII briefly invested the city before retiring. A second siege in 1142 was successful.

The main source for the siege is the second book of the contemporary Chronica Adefonsi imperatoris.

== Preparations ==
Besides the knights of the royal household, the king was accompanied by the private followings (mesnadas) of his leading barons, such as the brothers Count Rodrigo Martínez and Osorio Martínez, and by a contingent of militia from the nearest Christian city, Salamanca. The king also brought with him physicians and surgeons. (Note: Possibly one of these, a certain medicus and canon of Toledo named Hugo, was rewarded by Alfonso for his prior services in 1152.) Before investing Coria, Alfonso "sent plundering companies to the city to capture the men, women and all the livestock in the fields [outside the walls]." The Corians responded ("bravely" in the words of the Chronica) with a sally, but the plundering troops feigned retreat and led the Muslims into an ambush prepared by Alfonso, where they were all cut down. The city responded by shutting its gates and fortifying them with timbers; Alfonso moved his camp close to the city.

His besieging forces were inadequate for the task, however, and Alfonso sent messengers into the Extremadura and the Province of León threatening to confiscate the property of any "knights and foot soldiers [who] did not come" and help him with the siege.

== Siege ==
The conduct of the infantry, armed with spears, swords and clubs, and also of the archers, crossbowmen and slingers, was distinguished in light of the paucity of cavalry, but not enough to alter the result. Siege engineers also played a prominent role, but they played an even greater part in the second siege of Coria a few years later. The machines present are described by the Chronica as "high wooden towers that actually reached above the city walls", "engines" and "mantlets". The town was successfully shut off and nobody was said to have been able to either leave or enter.

The day before the actual assault on the walls had begun, Alfonso decided to go into the mountains to hunt deer, boar and bear, leaving Rodrigo Martínez in command of the siege. The next morning the magnate led an unsuccessful assault on the walls, in which he was wounded by an arrow while climbing one of the siege towers. The arrow pierced both his headpiece and his corselet and the iron head struck his neck. Although Rodrigo was able immediately to remove it, the surgeons were unable to staunch the hemorrhaging and he succumbed some hours later:

Neither the conjurers nor the physicians could stop the bleeding. Finally Rodrigo said to those around him, "Take off my arms, for I am extremely disheartened." Immediately they removed his arms and carried him to his tent. Throughout the entire day they attempted to cure his wound. Around sunset all hope in medicine was lost, and he died. As soon as the news had spread through the camp, there was tremendous mourning—more than anyone had imagined. Upon returning from the mountains, the Emperor was informed of the Consul's death. He learned the cause upon entering the camp. Alfonso gathered all of his advisors, and in their presence, he appointed Osorio, Rodrigo's brother, to be consul in his place.

The next day Alfonso "realizing his many misfortunes ... yielded to fate" and lifted the siege. The noblemen each returned to their homes while the king accompanied the militia to Salamanca. Rodrigo's brother, now Count Osorio, and the former's retainers carried Rodrigo's body back to León.
