= Francisco de Aguiar y Seijas =

Spanish cleric and bishop

- Archbishop of México
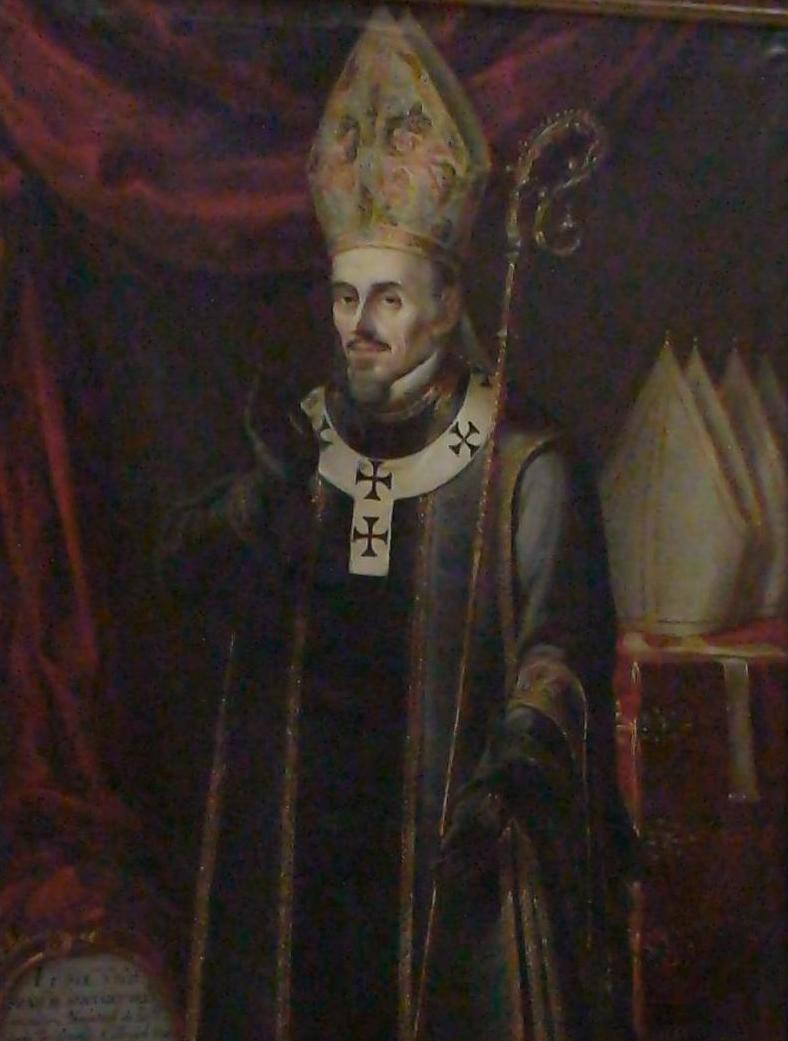
- Painting of Aguiar in the Pinacoteca de La Profesa in Mexico City
- Church: Catholic Church
- Archdiocese: Archdiocese of Mexico
- In office: 20 April 1682 – 14 August 1698
- Predecessor: Payo Enríquez de Rivera
- Successor: Juan Ortega y Montañés
- Previous post: Bishop of Michoacán (1677-1682)

Orders
- Consecration: 20 November 1678 by Manuel Fernández de Santa Cruz

Personal details
- Born: Francisco de Aguiar y Seijas y Ulloa; 11 February 1632 Kingdom of Galicia, Crown of Castile
- Died: 14 August 1698 (aged 66) Mexico City, Kingdom of Mexico, New Spain, Spanish Empire

Francisco de Aguiar y Seijas y Ulloa (11 February 1632, Betanzos, La Coruña – 14 August 1698, Mexico City) was a Spanish cleric and bishop, notable as bishop of Michoacán and archbishop of Mexico.

== Life ==
The son of Alonso Vázquez de Seixas y Lobera, regidor perpetuo of the city of Betanzos, and his wife Mariana de Ulloa, he initially studied at the Latin cathedral in Betanzos. On his father's death, he came under the protection of Fernando de Andrade, archbishop of Santiago, serving him as a page. He studied at the university of Santiago de Compostela and became its rector between 1668 and 1674. He was a magistral canon of the cathedral of Astorga. On 8 March 1666 he gained the office of canon penitentiary of the cathedral in a fierce competition with seven opponents. He studied in the Colegio Mayor de Cuenca of the University of Salamanca and was professor of philosophy and rector of the institution. Charles II of Spain presented him to be bishop of Guadalajara in Mexico in 1677, but he never took possession.

On 20 August 1677 he was named bishop of Valladolid de Michoacán, now the Archdiocese of Morelia. He embarked at Seville to sail to America on 14 July the same year. He only remained in office for three years until in 1680 pope Innocent XI made him archbishop of New Spain, now the Archdiocese of Mexico. He was enthroned in his cathedral on 2 January 1682 and one of his first acts was to found and build the Conciliar Seminary of Mexico – until then most priests serving in Mexican parishes were Spanish and had trained back in Spain itself. On 1 October he declared the College complete and on 18 October he formally opened and blessed it. He also constructed several charitable institutions, including several free schools for poor children, a hospital for the mentally ill, the college of San Miguel de Belén, the Casa de Misericordia and Hospital de la Magdalena for prostitutes and a house of meditation for poor virgins. On 26 March 1695 he also demolished and began the reconstruction of the Santuario de Nuestra Señora de Guadalupe, only completed in 1709.

He made four pastoral visits and was the only archbishop of Mexico of the 17th century to visit almost his whole jurisdiction in person. The first trip was from 3 November 1683 to 9 June 1684, reaching Sierra Baja, La Huasteca, Custodia de Tampico and the Sierra Alta. The second (21 November 1684 – 13 June 1685) went out to Tacubaya across the Toluca Valley. The third (9 November 1685 – 19 April 1686) went along the Cuautitlán-Tepeji-Querétaro route, whilst the fourth (November 1687 – 24 January 1688) went along the Valle de las Amilpas. A fifth trip (26 November 1687 – 24 January 1688) planned to reach Puerto de Acapulco, but he had to abandon it due to poor health.

Ascetic and moralistic, as archbishop he worked to ban cock-fighting, bull fighting, plays and secret theatre shows. He also clashed with the nun, poet and playwright Sor Juana Inés de la Cruz – fully exercising the Spanish Inquisition, he saw her profession as a nun as completely incompatible with the secular nature of much of her writing. He died aged 65 in Mexico City and was buried in the San Felipe chapel of the cathedral.

A group in Mexico started campaigning for his beatification straight after his death, with the support of archbishop Francisco de Lorenzana – the process began on 30 December 1767. On 25 July 1860, his cause was formally opened, granting him the title of Servant of God.

== External links and additional sources ==
- Cheney, David M. "Archdiocese of Morelia". Catholic-Hierarchy.org. (for Chronology of Bishops) ^{[self-published]}
- Chow, Gabriel. "Metropolitan Archdiocese of Morelia (Mexico)". GCatholic.org. (for Chronology of Bishops) ^{[self-published]}

Religious titles
Preceded by Francisco Verdín y Molina	Bishop of Michoacán; 1680–1698	Succeeded by Antonio de Monroy
Preceded by Payo Enríquez de Rivera	Archbishop of Mexico; 1682–1698	Succeeded by Juan Ortega y Montañés
