= Francisco Verdín y Molina =

Roman Catholic bishop

Most Reverend Francisco Verdín y Molina
- Bishop of Michoacán
- Church: Catholic Church
- Diocese: Diocese of Michoacán
- In office: 1673–1675
- Predecessor: Francisco Antonio Sarmiento de Luna y Enríquez
- Successor: Francisco de Aguiar y Seijas y Ulloa
- Previous post: Bishop of Guadalajara (1665-1673)

Orders
- Consecration: June 27, 1666 by Marcos Ramírez de Prado y Ovando

Personal details
- Died: April 29, 1675 Guadalajara, Mexico

Francisco Verdín y Molina (died April 29, 1675) was a Roman Catholic prelate who served as Bishop of Michoacán (1673–1675) and Bishop of Guadalajara (1665–1673).

== Biography ==
On May 30, 1665, Francisco Verdín y Molina was appointed by the King of Spain and confirmed by Pope Alexander VII as Bishop of Guadalajara. On June 27, 1666, he was consecrated bishop by Marcos Ramírez de Prado y Ovando, Bishop of Michoacán. On November 27, 1673, he was appointed by the King of Spain and confirmed by Pope Clement X as Bishop of Michoacán. He served as Bishop of Michoacán until his death on April 29, 1675.

While bishop of Guadalajara, he was the principal Consecrator of Francisco Antonio Sarmiento de Luna y Enríquez, Bishop of Michoacán.

== External links and additional sources ==
- Cheney, David M. "Archdiocese of Guadalajara". Catholic-Hierarchy.org. (for Chronology of Bishops)^{self-published}
- Chow, Gabriel. "Metropolitan Archdiocese of Guadalajara". GCatholic.org. (for Chronology of Bishops)^{self-published}
- Cheney, David M. "Archdiocese of Morelia". Catholic-Hierarchy.org. (for Chronology of Bishops) ^{[self-published]}
- Chow, Gabriel. "Metropolitan Archdiocese of Morelia (Mexico)". GCatholic.org. (for Chronology of Bishops) ^{[self-published]}

Catholic Church titles
Preceded by Juan Ruiz de Colmenero	Bishop of Guadalajara; 1665–1673	Succeeded by Manuel Fernández de Santa Cruz y Sahagún
Preceded by Francisco Antonio Sarmiento de Luna y Enríquez	Bishop of Michoacán; 1673–1675	Succeeded by Francisco de Aguiar y Seijas y Ulloa
