= Francisco Ocampo =

Most Reverend Francisco Ocampo
- Titular Bishop of Amyclae
- Church: Catholic Church
- Predecessor: Pietro de Vico (archbishop)
- Successor: Franz Christoph Rinck von Balderstein

Orders
- Consecration: 3 October 1660 by Miguel Pérez Cevallos

Personal details
- Died: 20 January 1684

Francisco Ocampo, O.S. (died 20 January 1684) was a Roman Catholic prelate who served as Titular Bishop of Amyclae (1660–1684).

== Biography ==
On 21 June 1660, Francisco Ocampo was appointed during the papacy of Pope Alexander VII as Titular Bishop of Amyclae. On 3 October 1660, he was consecrated bishop by Miguel Pérez Cevallos, Titular Bishop of Arcadiopolis in Asia. He served as Titular Bishop of Amyclae until his death on 20 January 1684.

== Episcopal succession ==
Episcopal succession of Francisco Ocampo

While bishop, he was the principal co-consecrator of:

- Dionisio Pérez Escobosa, Bishop of Mondoñedo (1663);
- Lorenzo de Sotomayor, Bishop of Zamora (1663);
- Matías de Moratinos y Santos, Bishop of Lugo (1664);
- Antonio Fernández del Campo Angulo y Velasco, Bishop of Tui (1666);
- Diego Ros de Medrano, Bishop of Orense (1673); and
- Antonio Medina Cachón y Ponce de León, Bishop of Ceuta (1676).

Catholic Church titles
Preceded by Pietro de Vico (archbishop)	Titular Bishop of Amyclae; 1660–1684	Succeeded by Franz Christoph Rinck von Balderstein
