= John Foley (Irish priest) =

Irish priest

Personal details
- Born: 1854
- Died: 1937 (aged 82–83)

John Foley was an Irish priest who served a president of St. Patrick's, Carlow College.

== Biography ==
He was born in 1854 at Mensal Lodge, Old Leighlin, County Carlow, to Patrick Foley and Anne Delaney. He was educated locally at Leighlinbridge National School and at Carlow College where he went on and trained for the priesthood, continuing his clerical studies from 1874 to 1881 at Maynooth College. He served as a church curate in Portlaoise, before returning to St. Patrick's College, Carlow as a professor in 1886. In 1896 he succeeded his older brother Patrick Foley as president of the college when his brother was appointed bishop of Kildare and Leighlin. He held the position as president of the college for the remainder of his life.

Foley's nephew Michael Alphonsus Foley (the son of his brother Michael) died serving in the Leinster Regiment in Egypt in 1919.

== Death ==
He died on 16 September 1937 at the age of 83 and is buried in the Carlow College cemetery.
