= Antonio Fernández del Campo Angulo y Velasco =

Spanish Roman Catholic prelate

Most Reverend Antonio Fernández del Campo Angulo y Velasco
- Bishop of Jaén
- Church: Catholic Church
- Diocese: Diocese of Jaén
- In office: 1671–1681
- Predecessor: Jerónimo Rodríguez de Valderas
- Successor: Juan Asensio Barrios
- Previous posts: Bishop of Tui (1666–1669); Bishop of Coria (1669–1671)

Orders
- Consecration: 12 September 1666 by Mateo de Sagade de Bugueyro

Personal details
- Born: 27 September 1619 Bilbao, Spain
- Died: 23 December 1681 (age 62) Jaén, Spain

Antonio Fernández del Campo Angulo y Velasco (27 September 1619 – 23 December 1681) was a Roman Catholic prelate who served as Bishop of Jaén (1671–1681), Bishop of Coria (1669–1671), and Bishop of Tui (1666–1669).

== Biography ==
Antonio Fernández del Campo Angulo y Velasco was born in Bilbao, Spain on 27 September 1619. On 7 June 1666, he was appointed during the papacy of Pope Alexander VII as Bishop of Tui. On 12 September 1666, he was consecrated bishop by Mateo de Sagade de Bugueyro, Bishop of Cartagena with Miguel Pérez Cevallos, Titular Bishop of Arcadiopolis in Asia, and Francisco Ocampo, Titular Bishop of Amyclae serving as co-consecrators. On 3 June 1669, he was appointed during the papacy of Pope Clement IX as Bishop of Coria. On 1 July 1671, he was appointed during the papacy of Pope Clement X as Bishop of Jaén. He served as Bishop of Jaén until his death on 23 December 1681. While bishop, he was the principal consecrator of Bernardino León de la Rocha, Bishop of Tui (1669); and the principal co-consecrator of Francisco Aguado, Bishop of Astorga (1677).

== External links and additional sources ==
- Cheney, David M. "Diocese of Tui-Vigo". Catholic-Hierarchy.org. (for Chronology of Bishops) ^{[self-published]}
- Chow, Gabriel. "Diocese of Tui-Vigo (Spain)". GCatholic.org. (for Chronology of Bishops) ^{[self-published]}
- Cheney, David M. "Diocese of Coria-Cáceres". Catholic-Hierarchy.org. (for Chronology of Bishops) ^{[self-published]}
- Chow, Gabriel. "Diocese of Coria-Caceres (Spain)". GCatholic.org. (for Chronology of Bishops) ^{[self-published]}
- Cheney, David M. "Diocese of Jaén". Catholic-Hierarchy.org. (for Chronology of Bishops) ^{[self-published]}
- Chow, Gabriel. "Diocese of Jaén (Spain)". GCatholic.org. (for Chronology of Bishops) ^{[self-published]}

Catholic Church titles
Preceded by Juan Pérez Gutiérrez	Bishop of Tui; 1666–1669	Succeeded by Bernardino León de la Rocha
Preceded by Frutos Bernardo Patón de Ayala	Bishop of Coria; 1669–1671	Succeeded by Gonzalo Bravo de Grajera
Preceded by Jerónimo Rodríguez de Valderas	Bishop of Jaén; 1671–1681	Succeeded by Juan Asensio Barrios
