= Arnold I (bishop of Coria) =

Arnold I (Spanish: Arnaldo) was the Bishop of Coria from 1181 until his death in 1197 or 1198. His diocese was poor—the inhospitable territories of the Sierra de Gata and Las Hurdes lay to the north, breaking off communication with the centre of the kingdom—and it lay exposed to attacks from enemies to the west (Portugal), south (Almohads) and east (Castile). A royal charter of Ferdinand II of 1183 says that it was deserta adhuc [et] in faucibus Sarracenorum: "hitherto desert [and] in the Saracens' throat".

Sometime before 1185 Arnold introduced the Augustinian Rule for his cathedral chapter. On 19 March 1185 he acquired a privilege from Pope Lucius III, confirmed in 1186 by Urban III. A royal charter from early in his episcopate portrays him as an ardent defender of the rights of his neglected see. The towns of Alcántara and Cáceres, which had been added to his see in the time of his predecessor minus one Suero I, were lost in that of his immediate predecessor, Peter I, to the Portuguese (1168–69); they were permanently lost to the Almohads in 1174.

== Bibliography ==
- E. Escobar Prieto. "Antigüedad y límites del obispado de Coria". Boletín de la Real Academia de la Historia 61 (1912), 331–33.
