= Juan Queipo de Llano y Valdés (bishop of Guadix) =

Spanish Roman Catholic prelate

Most Reverend Juan Queipo de Llano y Valdés
- Bishop of Coria
- Church: Catholic Church
- Diocese: Diocese of Coria
- In office: 1643
- Predecessor: Antonio González Acevedo
- Successor: Pedro Urbina Montoya
- Previous post: Bishop of Guadix (1640–1643)

Orders
- Consecration: 27 July 1642 by Domingo Pimentel Zúñiga

Personal details
- Died: 17 October 1643 Coria, Cáceres, Spain

Juan Queipo de Llano y Valdés (died 17 October 1643) was a Roman Catholic prelate who served as Bishop of Coria (1643) and Bishop of Guadix (1640–1643).

== Biography ==
Juan Queipo de Llano y Valdés was born in Cangas de Tineo, Spain. On 23 December 1639, he was selected by the King of Spain and confirmed by Pope Urban VIII on 13 August 1640 as Bishop of Guadix. On 27 July 1642, he was consecrated bishop by Domingo Pimentel Zúñiga, Bishop of Córdoba, with Luis Camargo Pacheco, Titular Bishop of Centuria, and Blas Tineo Palacios, Titular Bishop of Thermopylae, serving as co-consecrators. On 13 July 1643, he was appointed during the papacy of Pope Urban VIII as Bishop of Coria. He served as Bishop of Coria until his death on 17 October 1643. While bishop, he was the principal co-consecrator of Juan Valenzuela Velázquez, Bishop of Salamanca (1642).

== External links and additional sources ==
- Cheney, David M. "Diocese of Guadix". Catholic-Hierarchy.org. (for Chronology of Bishops)^{self-published}
- Chow, Gabriel. "Diocese of Guadix". GCatholic.org. (for Chronology of Bishops)^{self-published}
- Cheney, David M. "Diocese of Coria-Cáceres". Catholic-Hierarchy.org. (for Chronology of Bishops) ^{[self-published]}
- Chow, Gabriel. "Diocese of Coria-Caceres (Spain)". GCatholic.org. (for Chronology of Bishops) ^{[self-published]}

Catholic Church titles
Preceded by Juan Dionisio Fernández Portocarrero	Bishop of Guadix; 1640–1643	Succeeded by Francisco Pérez Roya
Preceded by Antonio González Acevedo	Bishop of Coria; 1643	Succeeded by Pedro Urbina Montoya
