= Arcadiopolis in Asia =

Ancient city on the site of modern Tire

Arcadiopolis in Asia was an ancient city and bishopric in Asia Minor, modern Tire in Turkey.

== History ==
Arcadiopolis was important enough in the Late Roman province of Asia Prima to become a suffragan of the Metropolis of Ephesus, but was to fade.

== Titular see ==
The diocese was nominally restored in the 17th century as a Latin Catholic titular bishopric, called just Arcadiopolis. It was renamed Arcadiopolis in Asia in 1933, avoiding confusion with Arcadiopolis in Europe.

It is vacant since decades, having had the following incumbents, all of the lowest (episcopal) rank :

- Guillaume de Gifford (1617.10.22 – 1622.12.05) (later Archbishop)
- Miguel Pérez Cevallos (1660.01.21 – 1681.10.02)
- Friedrich Karl Reichsgraf von Schönborn (1710.05.19 – 1729.01.30)
- Julius Nicolaus Torno (1744.12.07 – 1756)
- Giovanni Pietro Galletti, Benedictine Order (O.S.B.) (1763.08.22 – 1775.11.12)
- Mateusz Maurycy Wojakowski (1824.12.24 – 1845.02.07)
- Vincent Spaccapietra, Lazarists (C.M.) (1852.11.21 – 1855.04.18) (later Archbishop)
- Henri-Marie Amanton, Dominican Order (O.P.) (1857.03.10 – 1865.03.11) (later Archbishop)
- James Lynch, C.M. (1866.08.31 – 1888.03.05)
- William Gordon (1889.12.28 – 1890.06.16)
- Emilio Alfonso Todisco Grande (1892.07.11 – 1893.06.12)
- Theophilus Mayer, Mill Hill Missionaries (M.H.M.) (1894.07.31 – 1900.09.09)
- Célestin-Henri Joussard, Oblates of Mary Immaculate (O.M.I.) (1909.05.11 – 1932.09.20)
- Basil Harry Losten (1971.03.15 – 1977.09.20)
