= Guijo de Coria =

Coordinates: 40°06′04″N 6°27′47″W

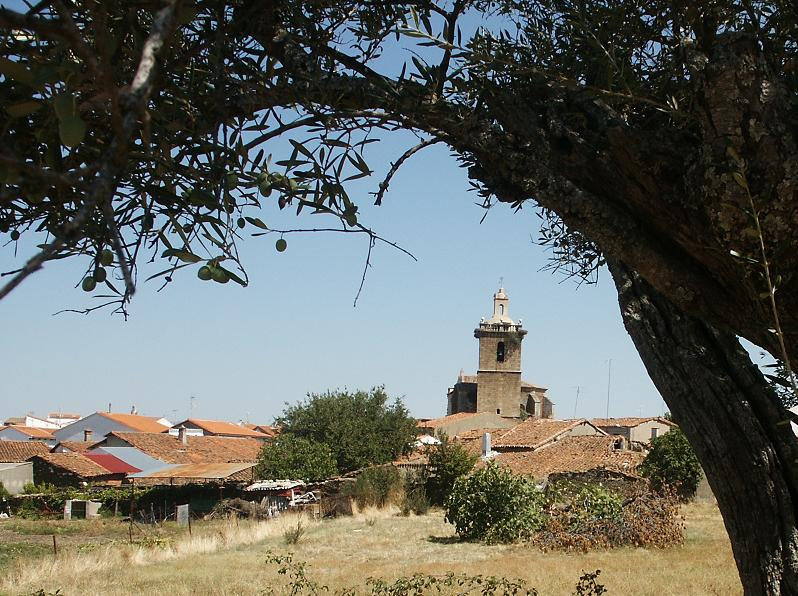
- Partial view of Guijo de coria

- Coat of arms

- Location in Spain.
- Country: Spain
- Autonomous community: Cáceres

Area
  - Total: 74.75 km^{2} (28.86 sq mi)
- Elevation: 444 m (1,457 ft)

Population (2025-01-01)
  - Total: 180
  - Density: 2.4/km^{2} (6.2/sq mi)
- Time zone: UTC+1 (CET)
  - Summer (DST): UTC+2 (CEST)
- Website: www.guijodecoria.es

Guijo de Coria is a municipality in the province of Cáceres and autonomous community of Extremadura, Spain. The municipality covers an area of 74.75 square kilometres (28.86 sq mi) and as of 2011 had a population of 263 people.

== See also ==
- List of municipalities in Cáceres
