= Siege of Coria (1142) =

12th-century battle of the Reconquista

- Part of the Reconquista
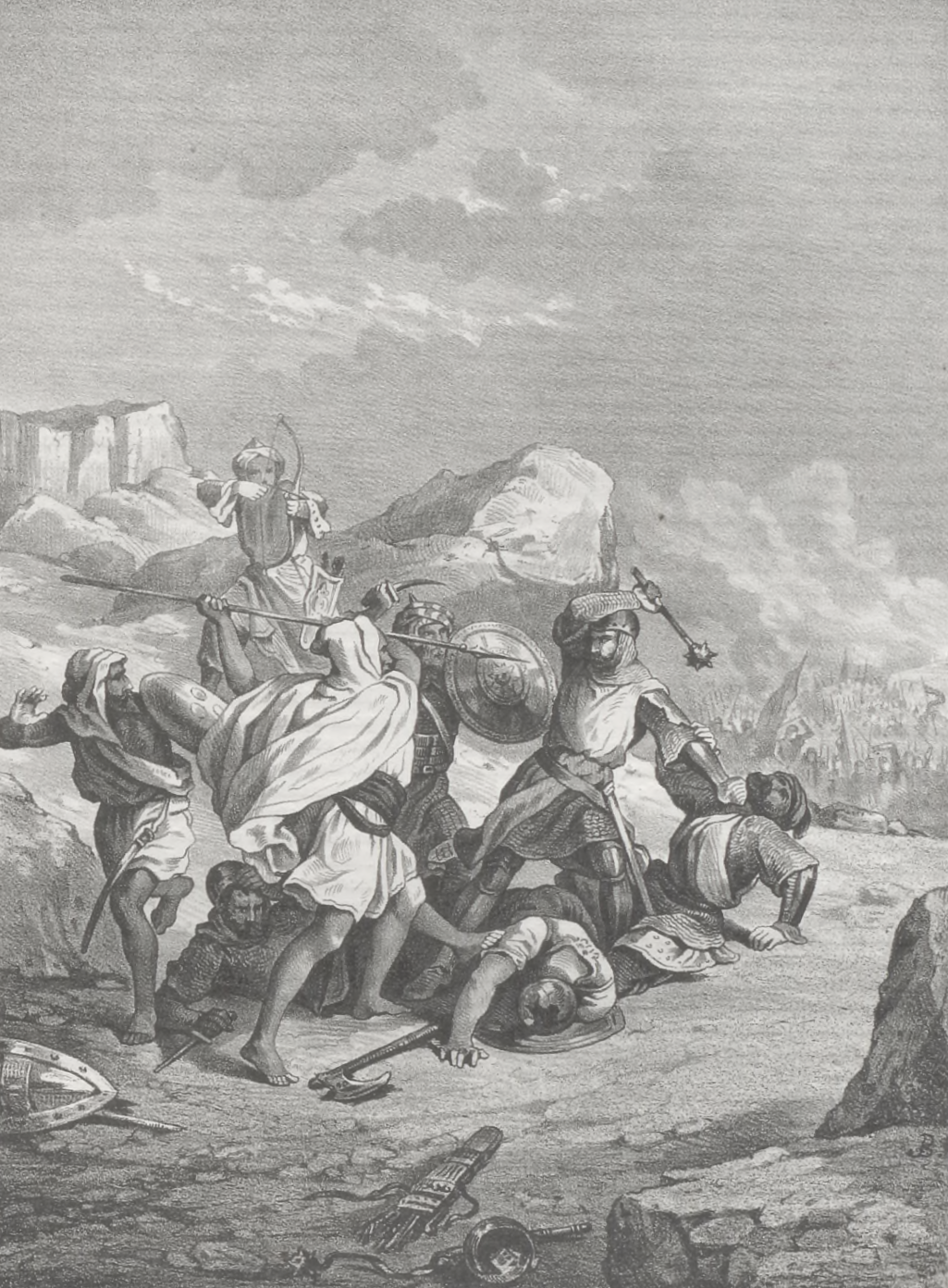
- Heroical death of Nuño Alfonso during the siege of Coria (illustration by J. Serra y Porsón, 1872)
Date	May–June 1142
Location	Coria, Cáceres
Result	Christian victory

Belligerents
Kingdom of León–Castile	Almoravid Empire

Commanders and leaders
Alfonso VII of León and Castile	Unknown

The second siege of Coria by the Emperor Alfonso VII of León was begun in early May 1142 and ended with the taking of the town in June. Coria had previously been reconquered in 1079 by Alfonso VI. It was lost to the Almoravids sometime not long after Alfonso's death in 1109. Alfonso VII had vainly besieged it in July 1138, in which action his general Rodrigo Martínez was killed. The successful siege of 1142 was "the prelude to a frenetic bout of military activity during the latter part of the reign of Alfonso VII [during which] the emperor is known to have led in person at least eight military expeditions into al-Andalus."

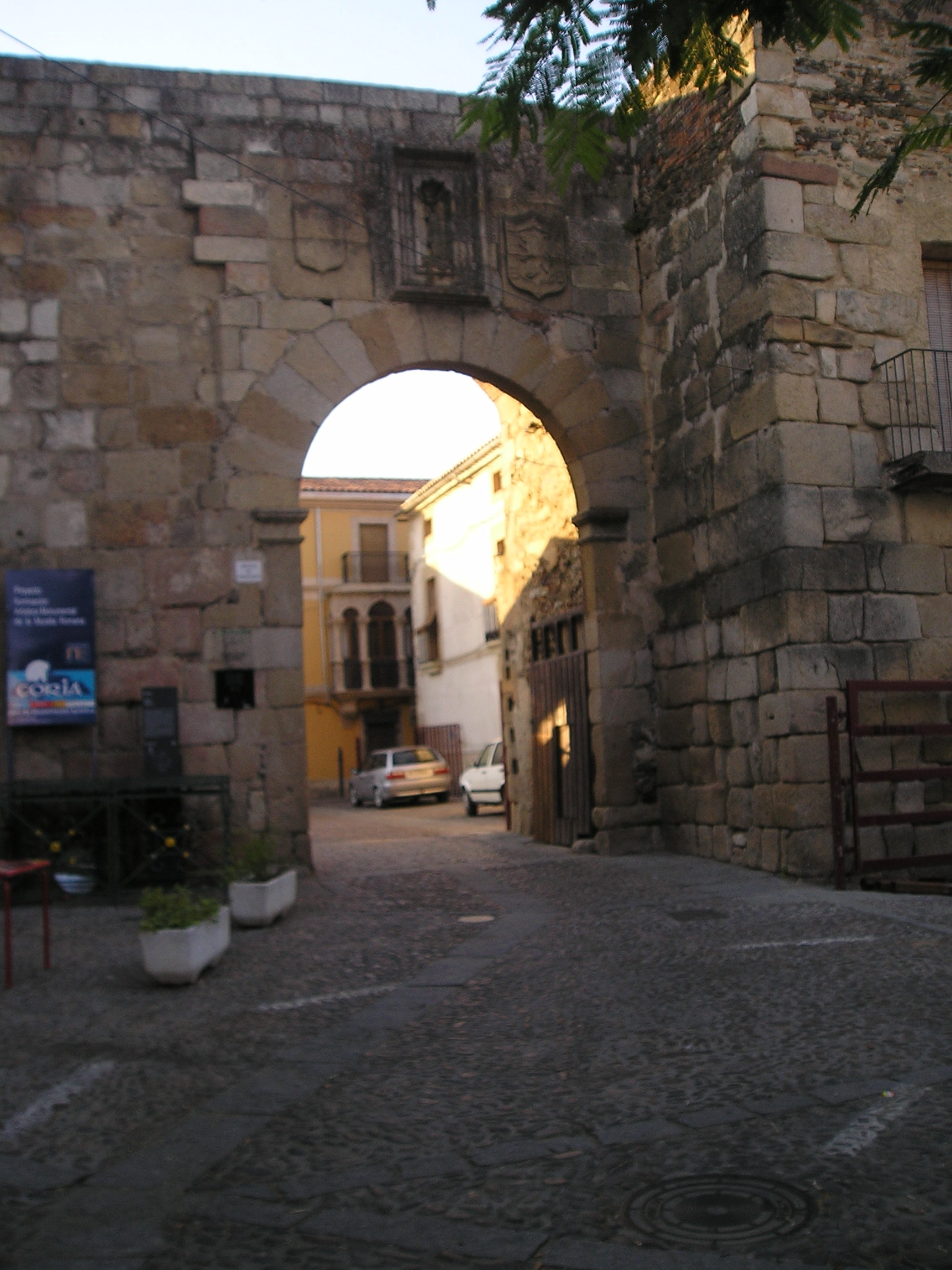
A gate at Coria dating from the Muslim period (original construction Roman)

The main source for the siege is the second book of the contemporary Chronica Adefonsi imperatoris, which dates the siege to "two years and six months after the capture of Oreja". The initial response to the arrival of Alfonso's army by the inhabitants of Coria, both the Almoravids (from northern Africa) and the local Muslims, was to fortify the gates against entry or exit with a "strong supporting wall". While siege engines had been used four years earlier, in 1142 they were more effectual:

[Alfonso] commanded his engineers to build a wooden tower which projected above the walls of the city, and siege engines, catapults and mantlets with which they began to undermine the walls of the city and to destroy the towers.

Famine rapidly set in. The siege was still underway on 6 June, when, from his camp, Alfonso granted the village of Fradejas to the Diocese of Zamora. The charter of this grant attests that Ponce Giraldo de Cabrera, possibly already lord of nearby Salamanca and recently created prince of Zamora, and Ponce de Minerva were present at the siege. With deaths from starvation on the rise, the Almoravids offered Alfonso terms: if in a period of thirty days they could not gain external aid, they would surrender the city with all of their captives and riches. Letters were sent to the kings of al-Andalus, but as none could lend any aid, the garrison surrendered peacefully.

After the siege a bishop, Íñigo Navarro, was appointed to the refounded Diocese of Coria. Alfonso then marched north to Salamanca, where the Abbot Peter the Venerable was awaiting him.
