= Diocese of Coria-Cáceres =

Roman Catholic diocese in Spain

Diocese of Coria-Cáceres Dioecesis Cauriensis-Castrorum Caeciliorum Diócesis de Coria-Cáceres

Catholic
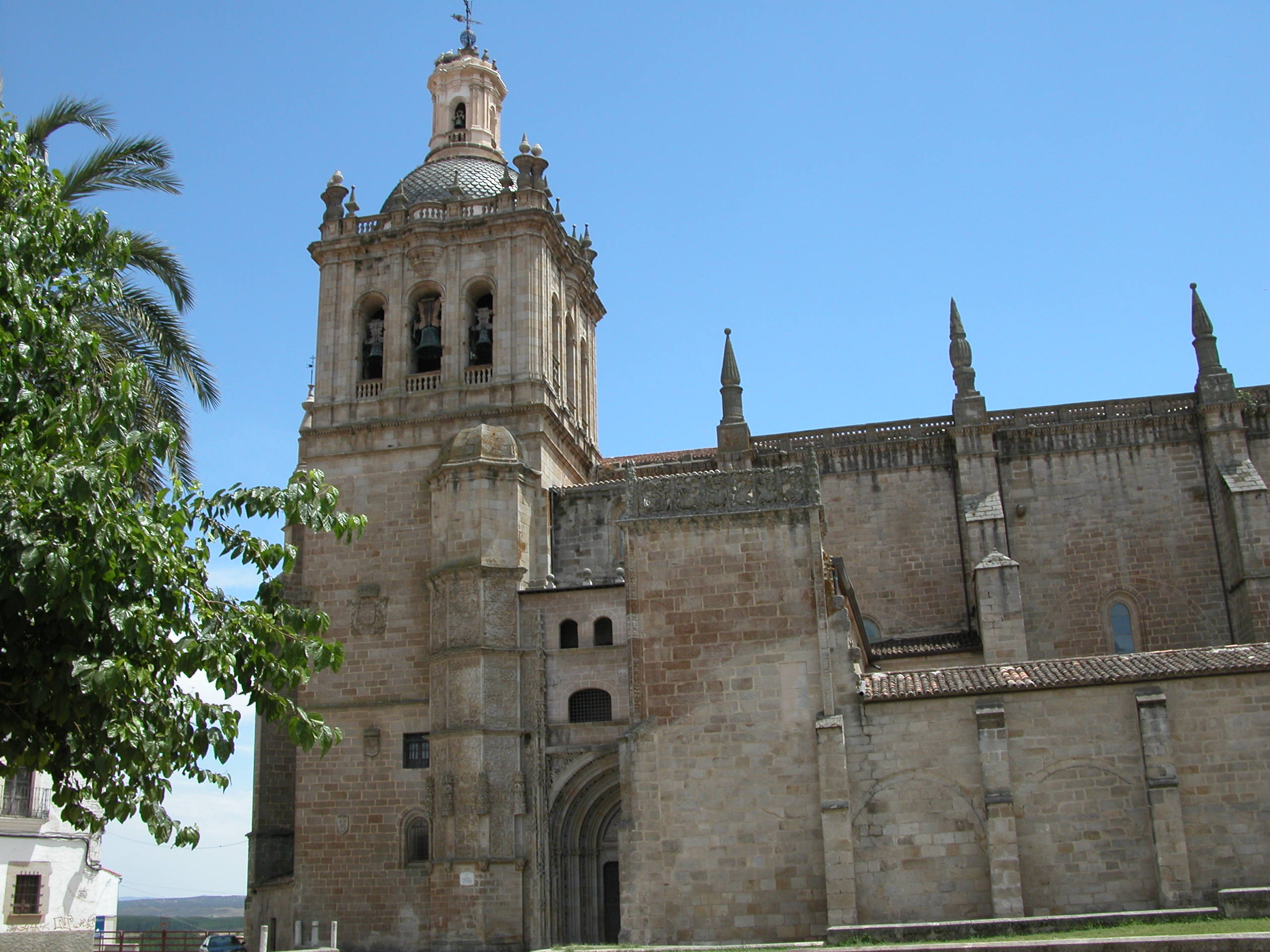
- Coria Cathedral

Location
- Country: Spain
- Ecclesiastical province: Mérida–Badajoz
- Metropolitan: Mérida–Badajoz
- Coordinates: 39°58′55.07″N 6°32′13.373″W

Statistics
- Area: 10,052 km^{2} (3,881 sq mi)
- Population: Total; Catholics: (as of 2006); 263,430; 251,701 (95.5%)

Information
- Denomination: Roman Catholic
- Rite: Latin Rite
- Established: 1143 (As Diocese of Coria); 9 April 1957 (As Diocese of Coria-Cáceres)
- Cathedral: Cathedral of the Assumption of Our Lady in Coria
- Co-cathedral: Co-Cathedral of St. Mary in Cáceres

Current leadership
- Pope: Leo XIV
- Bishop: Jesús Pulido Arriero, H.S.O.D.
- Metropolitan Archbishop: Celso Morga Iruzubieta

Website
- Website of the Diocese

The Diocese of Coria-Cáceres (Latin: Dioecesis Cauriensis-Castrorum Caeciliorum) is a Latin Church diocese of the Catholic Church located in the cities of Coria and Cáceres in the ecclesiastical province of Mérida–Badajoz in Spain.

== History ==
- 1143: Established as Diocese of Coria
- April 9, 1957: Renamed as Diocese of Coria – Cáceres

== Bishops of Coria ==
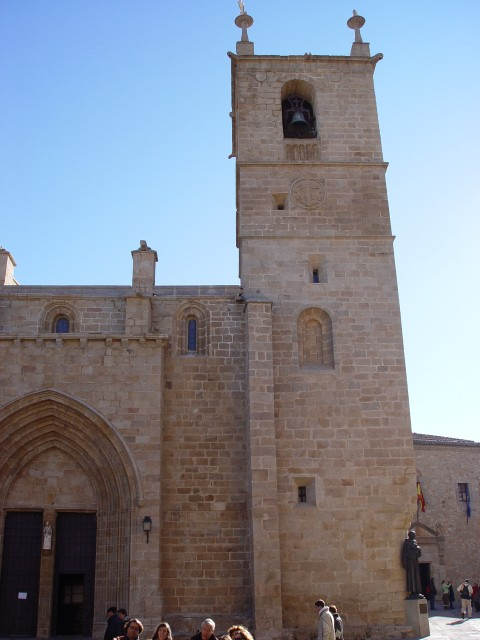
Concatedral de Santa María, Cáceres (Co-Cathedral of St. Mary)

- Jacinto (c. 589)
- Elías (c. 610)
- Bonifacio I (c. 633, 638)
- Juan (c. 646, 653)
- Donato (c. 666)
- Atala (c. 681, 688)
- Bonifacio II (c. 693)
- Jacobo (c. 876, 899)
- Diego I. (900–902)
- Íñigo Navarro (1142–1152, named Bishop of Salamanca)
- Suero I (1157–1168), first bishop to also hold Cáceres (1166)
- Pedro I (1169–1177)
- Arnaldo I (1181–1197)
- Arnaldo II (1199–1211)
- Giraldo (1212–1227)
- Pedro II (1227–1232)
- Sancho (1232–1252)
- Pedro III (1253–1260)
- Fernando I (1261–1271)
- Gonzalo (1272–1277)
- Suero II (1277–1280)
- Simón (1281–1282)
- Alonso I (1283–1316)
- Pedro Méndez Sotomayor y Meirás (1317 Appointed – 1324 Died)
- Alonso II (1325–1335)
- Juan I (1335–1343)
- Alfonso (1344–1348)
- Pedro Raimundo de Barrière, O.S.A. (20 Feb 1348 – 31 Aug 1360 Appointed Bishop of León)
- Rodrigo (1360–1365?)
- Diego II (1365–1368?)
- Gil (1368–1371)
- Guillermo (1371–1379)
- Fernando II (1379–1380?)
- Alonso Maimón (1381?–1389)
- Juan II (1399–1400)
- Esteban de Crivelo (1400–1401)
- Alonso III (1401–1403 Elect)
- García de Castronuño (1403–1420?)
- Martín Galos (1420–1436)
- Alfonso de Villegas (1436–1437)
- Pedro López de Miranda (1438–1443)
- Juan de Carvajal (11 Oct 1443 – 10 Aug 1446, not possessed) Appointed Bishop of Plasencia
- Alonso Enríquez de Mendoza (May 1444 – 1455)
- Fernando López de Villaescusa (1455–1457) Appointed Bishop of Segovia
- Iñigo Manrique de Lara (archbishop) (1457–1475 Appointed Bishop of Jaén
- Francisco de Toledo (bishop) (1475–1479) Died
- Juan de Ortega (1479–1485) Died
- Diego de Fonseca (27 Jan 1486 – 1487 Died)
- Vasco Ramírez de Rivera (18 May 1487 – 4 Dec 1488 Died)
- Pedro Ximénez de Préxamo (23 Jan 1489 – 1495 Died)
- César de Borja (1495 – 6 Sep 1499 Resigned)
- Juan López (bishop of Coria) (1499 – 5 Aug 1501 Died)

=== 1500 to 1700 ===
- François Busleiden (26 Nov 1501 – 23 Aug 1502 Died)
- Juan Ortega Bravo de la Laguna (5 May 1503 – 1517 Died)
- Bernardo Dovizi da Bibbiena (4 Nov 1517 – 9 Sep 1519 Appointed Administrator of Coutances)
- Carlos Lalaing (1520 – 1524)
- Pedro de Montemolín (1527-?)
- Íñigo López de Mendoza y Zúñiga (1528 – 2 Mar 1529 Appointed Bishop of Burgos)
- Guillermo Valdenese (2 May 1529 – 23 May 1530 Died)
- Francisco de Quiñones, O.F.M. Obs. (5 Dec 1530 – 1532 Resigned)
- Francisco Mendoza Bobadilla (14 Feb 1533 – 27 Jun 1550 Appointed Bishop of Burgos)
- Diego Enríquez de Almansa (14 Jul 1550 – Oct 1565 Died)
- Diego Deza Tello (26 Apr 1566 – 11 Sep 1577 Appointed Bishop of Jaén)
- Pedro Serrano Téllez (11 Sep 1577 – 22 Sep 1578 Died)
- Pedro García Galarza (9 Jan 1579 – 6 May 1604 Died)
- Pedro Carvajal Girón de Loaysa (10 Dec 1603 – 8 Sep 1621 Died)
- Jerónimo Ruiz Camargo (23 May 1622 – 16 Feb 1632 Appointed Bishop of Córdoba)
- Juan Roco Campofrío, O.S.B. (8 Mar 1632 – 16 Sep 1635 Died)
- Antonio González Acevedo (5 Oct 1637 – 14 Mar 1642 Died)
- Juan Queipo de Llano y Valdés (bishop) (13 Jul 1643 – 17 Oct 1643 Died)
- Pedro Urbina Montoya, O.F.M. (2 May 1644 – 28 Jun 1649 Confirmed, Archbishop of Valencia)
- Francisco de Zapata y Mendoza (13 Sep 1649 – 1655 Died)
- Antonio Sarmiento de Luna y Enríquez (14 May 1655 – 9 Jul 1657 Confirmed Bishop of Sigüenza)
- Diego López de la Vega (28 Jan 1658 – 5 Jun 1659 Died)
- Francisco de Gamboa, O.S.A. (10 Nov 1659 – 2 Jul 1663 Appointed Archbishop of Zaragoza)
- Gabriel Vázquez Saavedra y Rojas (27 Aug 1663 – 1664 Died)
- Frutos Bernardo Patón de Ayala (23 Jun 1664 – 4 Feb 1669 Appointed Bishop of Sigüenza)
- Antonio Fernández del Campo Angulo y Velasco (3 Jun 1669 – 1 Jul 1671 Appointed Bishop of Jaén)
- Gonzalo Bravo de Grajera (28 Sep 1671 – 30 Aug 1672 Died)
- Baltasar de los Reyes, O.S.H. (30 Jan 1673 – 5 May 1673 Died)
- Bernardino León de la Rocha (25 Sep 1673 – 4 Jan 1675 Died)
- Francisco Antonio Sarmiento de Luna y Enríquez, O.S.A. (27 May 1675 – 21 Jul 1683 Died)
- Juan de Porras y Atienza (24 Apr 1684 – 28 Jul 1704 Died)

=== 1700 to 1949 ===
- Miguel Pérez Lara (9 Feb 1705 – 1710 Died)
- Luis de Salcedo y Azcona (22 May 1713 – 1 Jul 1716 Appointed Archbishop of Santiago de Compostela)
- Sancho Antonio Belunza Corcuera (5 Oct 1716 – 15 Oct 1731 Died)
- Miguel Vicente Cebrián y Agustín (9 Jun 1732 – 24 Sep 1742 Appointed Bishop of Córdoba)
- José Francisco Magdaleno (24 Sep 1742 – 5 Feb 1749 Died)
- José Cepeda (19 Jan 1750: appointment did not take effect)
- Juan José García Alvaro (25 May 1750 – Jan 1784 Died)
- Diego Martín Rodríguez, O.F.M. Obs. (14 Feb 1785 – 4 May 1789 Died)
- Juan Alvarez Castro (29 Mar 1790 – 29 Aug 1809 Died)
- Blas Jacobo Beltrán (10 Jul 1815 – 28 Apr 1821 Died)
- Joaquín López y Sicilia (12 Jul 1824 – 15 Mar 1830 Confirmed Archbishop of Burgos)
- Ramón Montero (15 Mar 1830 – 4 Oct 1847 Confirmed Archbishop of Burgos)
- Manuel Anselmo Nafría (17 Jan 1848 – 28 Jan 1851 Died)
- Antonio María Sánchez Cid y Carrascal, C.O. (27 Sep 1852 – 14 Feb 1858 Died)
- Juan Nepomuceno Garcia Gómez (25 Jun 1858 – 6 Oct 1864 Died)
- Esteban José Pérez Fernández (25 Sep 1865 – 22 Jun 1868 Confirmed Bishop of Málaga)
- Pedro Núñez y Pernía, O.S.B. (24 Sep 1868 – 16 Mar 1884 Died)
- Marcelo Spínola y Maestre (10 Nov 1884 – 10 Jun 1886 Appointed Bishop of Málaga)
- Luis Felipe Ortiz y Gutiérrez (10 Jun 1886 – 19 Jan 1893 Appointed Bishop of Zamora)
- Ramón Peris Mencheta (21 May 1894 – 6 Jan 1920 Died)
- Pedro Segura y Sáenz (10 Jul 1920 – 20 Dec 1926 Appointed Archbishop of Burgos)
- Dionisio Moreno y Barrio (2 Dec 1927 Appointed – 10 Dec 1934 Died)
- Francisco Barbado y Viejo, O.P. (1 May 1935 – 10 Apr 1942 Appointed Bishop of Salamanca)
- Francisco Cavero y Tormo (9 Dec 1944 – 10 Apr 1949 Died)

== Bishops of Coria-Cáceres ==
- Manuel Llopis Ivorra (2 Feb 1950 – 16 Mar 1977 Retired)
- Jesús Domínguez Gómez (16 Mar 1977 – 26 Oct 1990 Died)
- Ciriaco Benavente Mateos (17 Jan 1992 – 16 Oct 2006 Appointed Bishop of Albacete)
- Francisco Cerro Chaves (21 Jun 2007 – 27 Dec 2019 Appointed Archbishop of Toledo)
- Jesús Pulido Arriero, H.S.O.D. (7 Dec 2021 – )

== See also ==
- Roman Catholicism in Spain
- Roman Catholic Archdiocese of Nueva Cáceres

== Sources ==
- Catholic Hierarchy ^{[self-published]}
