= Navarro (bishop of Coria and Salamanca) =

Navarro (died 1158/9) was the Bishop of Coria from 1142 to 1151 and thereafter the Bishop of Salamanca until his death.

The main source for his early life is a single document from Segovia dated 1148. From this it is known that he held the title of magister and was an Augustinian canon at Segovia before he was a bishop. He probably hailed from Navarre, as did many of the repobladores of the region of Segovia and Ávila. At some point, "willing to lead a stricter life", he founded a religious community at Párraces, probably composed of fellow Augustinians.

There had been no bishop at Coria since 902 when, after re-conquering the city in June 1142 Alfonso VII of León re-established the diocese and appointed a bishop. Navarro was referred to as novo ordinato (newly ordained) in a royal document issued 30 August. The Chronica Adefonsi imperatoris, in relating the conquest of Coria, notes that "a church was dedicated there in honor of Saint Mary and all the saints [and] they consecrated as bishop a pious man whose name was Navarro" (II, §161). A document of 3 October lists the properties to be given to the new diocese.

Navarro appears to have passed most of his episcopate in his diocese, perhaps because the state of affairs required constant attendance, and so he is an obscure figure, confirming only five known royal documents during his time ruling the see of Coria, which was then the newest and poorest diocese in the kingdom. In 1148 Navarro attended the Council of Reims and afterwards remained with the Curia romana for some time. Pope Eugenius III wrote a letter to Alfonso VII explaining the arrangement: "We wish it be made known that we have led the bishop of Coria to stay with us, because at that time the church to which he is commissioned had been pressed into grave poverty, as we believe, and he cannot there exercise his office usefully, because then we trust that your munificence to him should honourably provide the necessities." In 1151 Navarro was transferred to the greater and richer diocese of Salamanca, closer to the centre of the kingdom, perhaps an indication of royal favour, to replace the deceased bishop Berengar.

The period of the episcopates of Berengar and Navarro at Salamanca (c.1140 to c.1160) was characterised by economic growth in the town and its region, as well as the growth in population of Salamanca itself, although the bishops themselves remain generally obscure players in these events. It was at that time the most successful of the areas of new settlement, and Navarro was praised by the king for his work in this regard. On 30 April 1154, Alfonso VII granted Navarro rights over those churches he had built near the new town of Castronuño. The charter records that the bishop and his archdeacon, Ciprián, had given help (adiutorium) to the founder and namesake of the settlement, Nuño Pérez de Lara, and had outfitted the new churches with liturgical books and vestments. By the time of Navarro's successor, Ordoño, the schools of Salamanca were attracting students from France, laying the groundwork for Spain's first university, the Universidad de Salamanca, a half century later.

== Primary sources ==
- Glenn Edward Lipskey, ed. 1972. The Chronicle of Alfonso the Emperor: A Translation of the Chronica Adefonsi imperatoris. PhD dissertation, Northwestern University.
