= Coria, Cáceres =

Coria
- Municipality
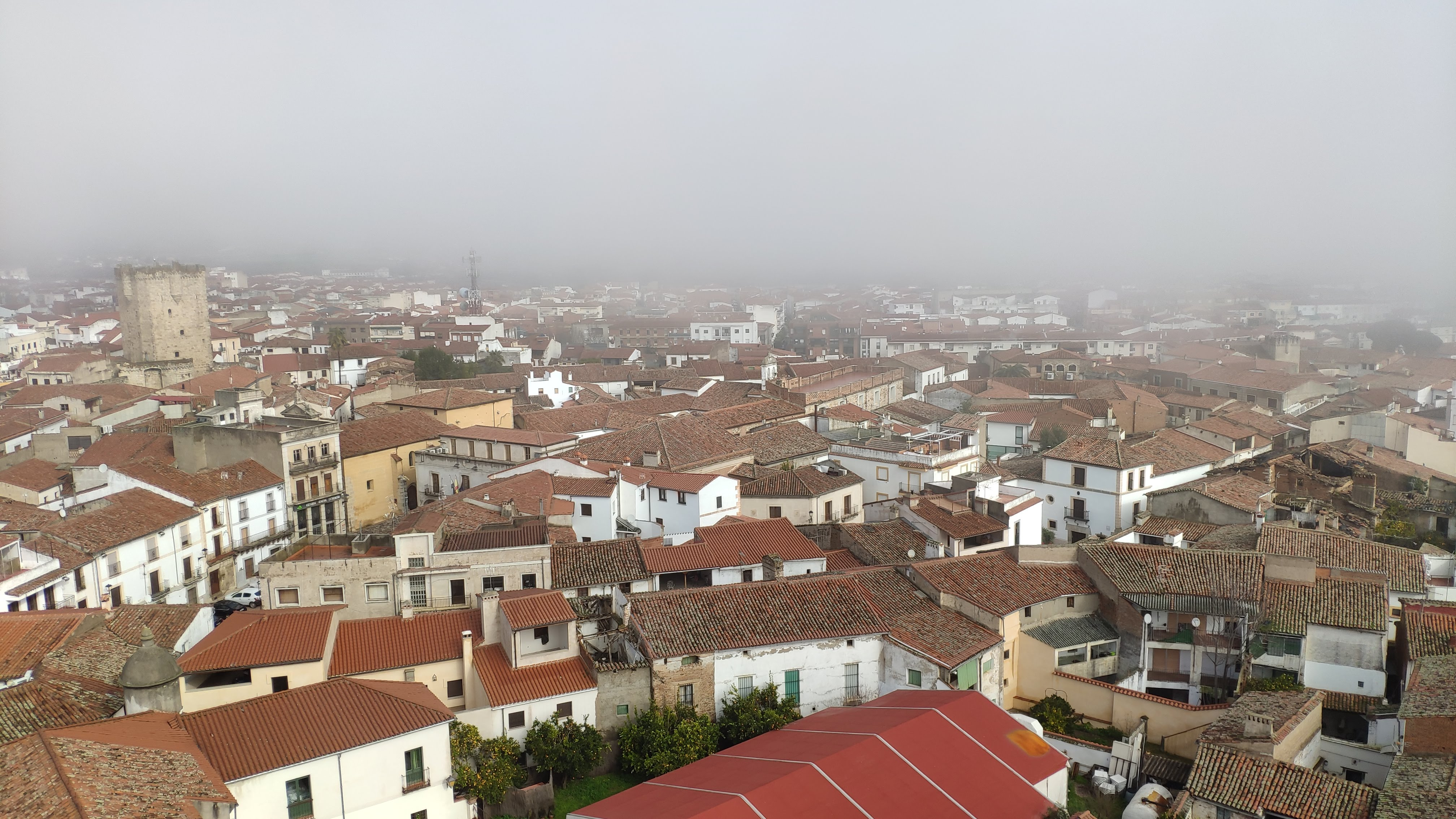
- View of Coria

- Flag Coat of arms

- Location in Spain Coria (Spain)
- Coordinates: 39°58′55″N 6°32′14″W
- Country: Spain
- Autonomous community: Extremadura
- Province: Cáceres

Government
  - Mayor: José Manuel García Ballester (PP)

Area
  - Total: 103.46 km^{2} (39.95 sq mi)
- Elevation: 280 m (920 ft)

Population (2025-01-01)
  - Total: 12,001
  - Density: 116.00/km^{2} (300.43/sq mi)
- Demonym: Caurienses or Corianos
- Time zone: UTC+1 (CET)
  - Summer (DST): UTC+2 (CEST)
- Website: Official website

Coria (Spanish: [ˈkoɾja]) is a municipality of Spain belonging to the province of Cáceres, Extremadura. In addition to the town of the same name, the municipality also comprises the settlements of Puebla de Argeme and Rincón del Obispo. With a population of 12,531 inhabitants, Coria is the fourth most-populated municipality in the province.

It is located on the Alagón river bank.

Coria preserves several monuments and holds an annual national tourist interest festival in honor of San Juan.

== History ==
Founded before the Romans occupied the Iberian Peninsula, and called Caura, the Romans gave it its present name in Latin, Caurium, and later the city was granted Roman citizenship. Later under the Visigoths, the Diocese of Coria was created. The centuries in which Coria was the only capital of the diocese were of great prosperity for the city.

Ordoño I of Asturias raided Coria and its surroundings circa 859−860, returning to the north with a loot that included the local Christian Mozarab population.

During the time that Muslim Coria was a borderland city, it had probably an average demographic importance, offset by a larger geostrategic notability, located in between the Tagus and the Sistema Central. Arabic sources hint towards a larger importance of agrarian activities rather than livestock. Christian sources suggest the existence of a scattered mode of population with the probable proliferation of alquerías around the medina.

Coria was conquered by Christians in 1077, and held briefly. It was conquered by the Almoravids just after 1109 and unsuccessfully besieged in 1138. A successful Christian conquest followed after a two-month siege in 1142, after which the diocese was restored. In 1174, the place was taken over by the troops of Almohad general Abu Hafs, returning to Christian rule after 1184. While it is understood the place should have already enjoyed its own fuero by the early 13th-century, the first evidence about the existence of a local fuero (presumably modelled after the second fuero of Ciudad Rodrigo) traces back to 1227.

Coria became the capital of a lordship to which some towns are still named after, such as Guijo de Coria or Casillas de Coria.

During the 1640−1668 War against Portugal, the land of Coria suffered greatly; although the city was not taken by the Portuguese, the countryside was reiterately raided, causing the impoverishment of the region.

== Climate ==
Coria has a hot summer mediterranean climate (Csa in Köppen climate classification), with mild wet winters and very hot, dry summers. During the summer temperatures often exceed 35 °C (95 °F) and can reach over 40 °C (104 °F) during heat waves. During winter, temperatures below 0 °C (32 °F) are rare, but can occur during the coldest nights of the year. Precipitation is concentrated in the autumn and winter months.

Climate data for Coria (1991-2020), extremes (1989-present)
Month	Jan	Feb	Mar	Apr	May	Jun	Jul	Aug	Sep	Oct	Nov	Dec	Year
Record high °C (°F)	21.0 (69.8)	23.6 (74.5)	29.4 (84.9)	35.0 (95.0)	38.4 (101.1)	43.1 (109.6)	44.7 (112.5)	44.0 (111.2)	43.4 (110.1)	35.7 (96.3)	26.5 (79.7)	20.9 (69.6)	44.7 (112.5)
Mean daily maximum °C (°F)	12.3 (54.1)	14.4 (57.9)	18.0 (64.4)	20.5 (68.9)	25.4 (77.7)	30.9 (87.6)	35.1 (95.2)	34.9 (94.8)	29.8 (85.6)	22.6 (72.7)	16.0 (60.8)	12.6 (54.7)	22.7 (72.9)
Daily mean °C (°F)	7.7 (45.9)	9.2 (48.6)	12.3 (54.1)	14.6 (58.3)	18.8 (65.8)	23.6 (74.5)	27.0 (80.6)	26.9 (80.4)	22.8 (73.0)	17.1 (62.8)	11.6 (52.9)	8.5 (47.3)	16.7 (62.0)
Mean daily minimum °C (°F)	3.1 (37.6)	4.0 (39.2)	6.5 (43.7)	8.6 (47.5)	12.1 (53.8)	16.2 (61.2)	18.9 (66.0)	18.9 (66.0)	15.7 (60.3)	11.7 (53.1)	7.0 (44.6)	4.3 (39.7)	10.6 (51.1)
Record low °C (°F)	−4.6 (23.7)	−3.4 (25.9)	−5.1 (22.8)	0.6 (33.1)	2.5 (36.5)	8.4 (47.1)	10.3 (50.5)	11.6 (52.9)	7.4 (45.3)	3.0 (37.4)	−2.7 (27.1)	−5.8 (21.6)	−5.8 (21.6)
Average precipitation mm (inches)	45.3 (1.78)	44.2 (1.74)	56.4 (2.22)	47.2 (1.86)	33.8 (1.33)	8.4 (0.33)	3.0 (0.12)	5.4 (0.21)	25.6 (1.01)	82.6 (3.25)	72.2 (2.84)	69.0 (2.72)	493.1 (19.41)
Average precipitation days (≥ 1 mm)	6.8	5.2	6.6	6.9	4.6	1.5	0.7	1.0	3.1	7.8	7.6	7.6	59.4
Source: Agencia Estatal de Meteorologia (AEMET OpenData)

== Sights ==
- Roman walls (3rd-4th centuries AD)
- Cathedral of Santa María de la Asunción, in transitional Gothic style
- Bishop's palace (1628)
- Castle of Coria (1472–1478)
- Baroque Hermitage of Nuestra Señora de Argeme (17th century)
- Royal Prisons (1686)
- Old Bridge (Puente Viejo), dating to the 15th-16th centuries
- Convent of the Madre de Dios, founded in the 13th century. The current structure dates to the 14th-16th centuries
- Church of Santiago, in Baroque style (16th-18th centuries)
- Palaces of the Dukes of Alba (15th-16th centuries)

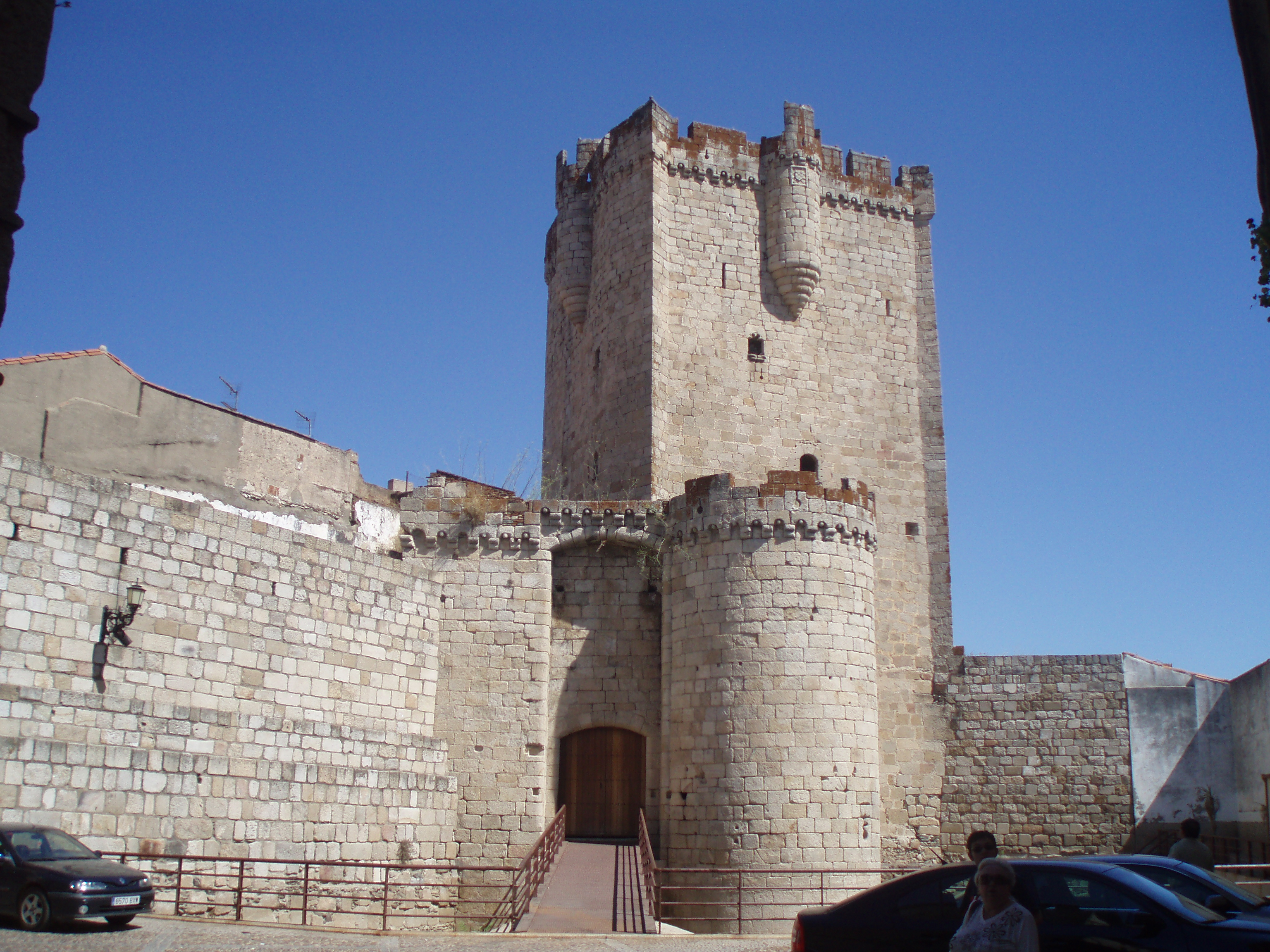
Coria castle

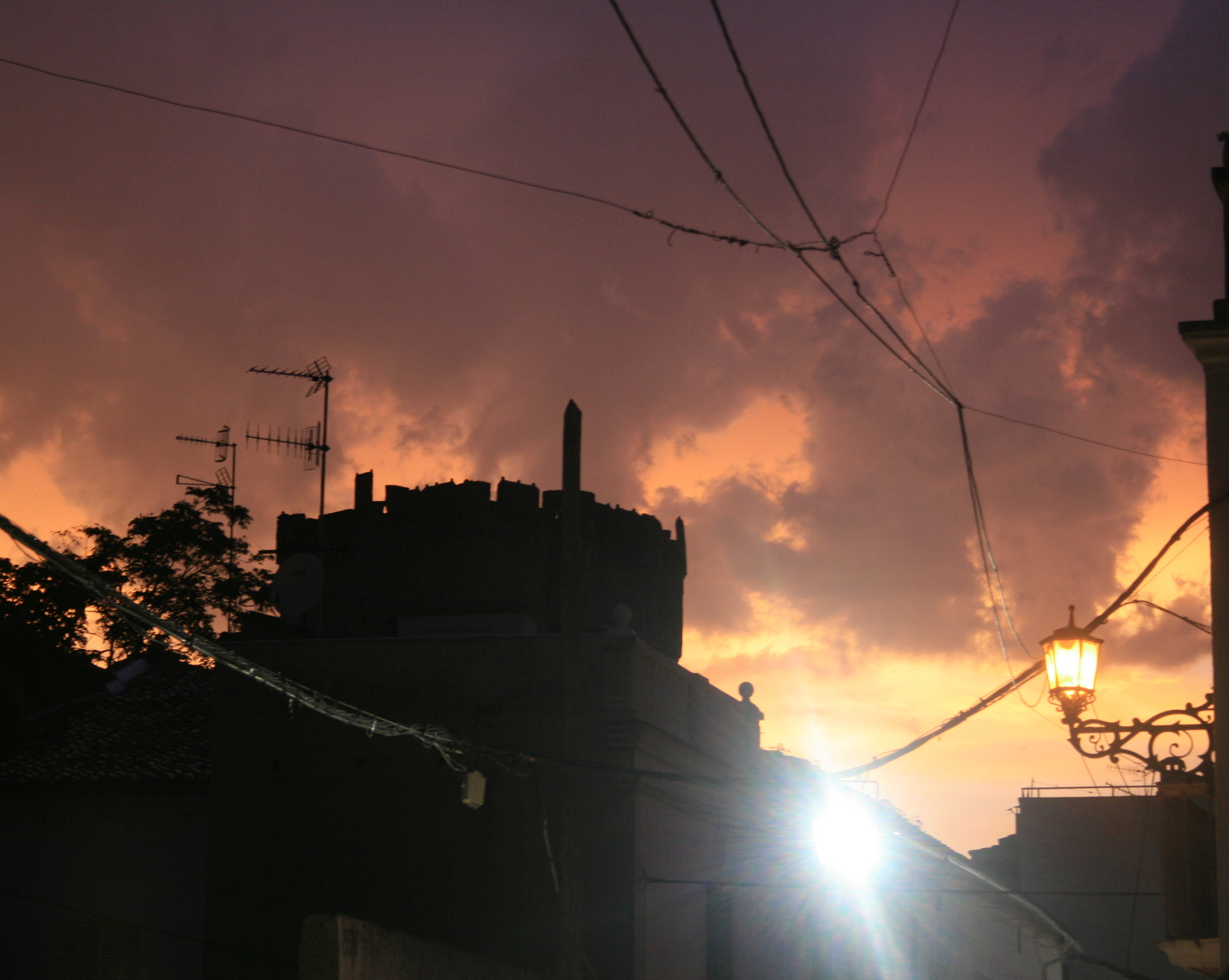
Coria sunset after rain

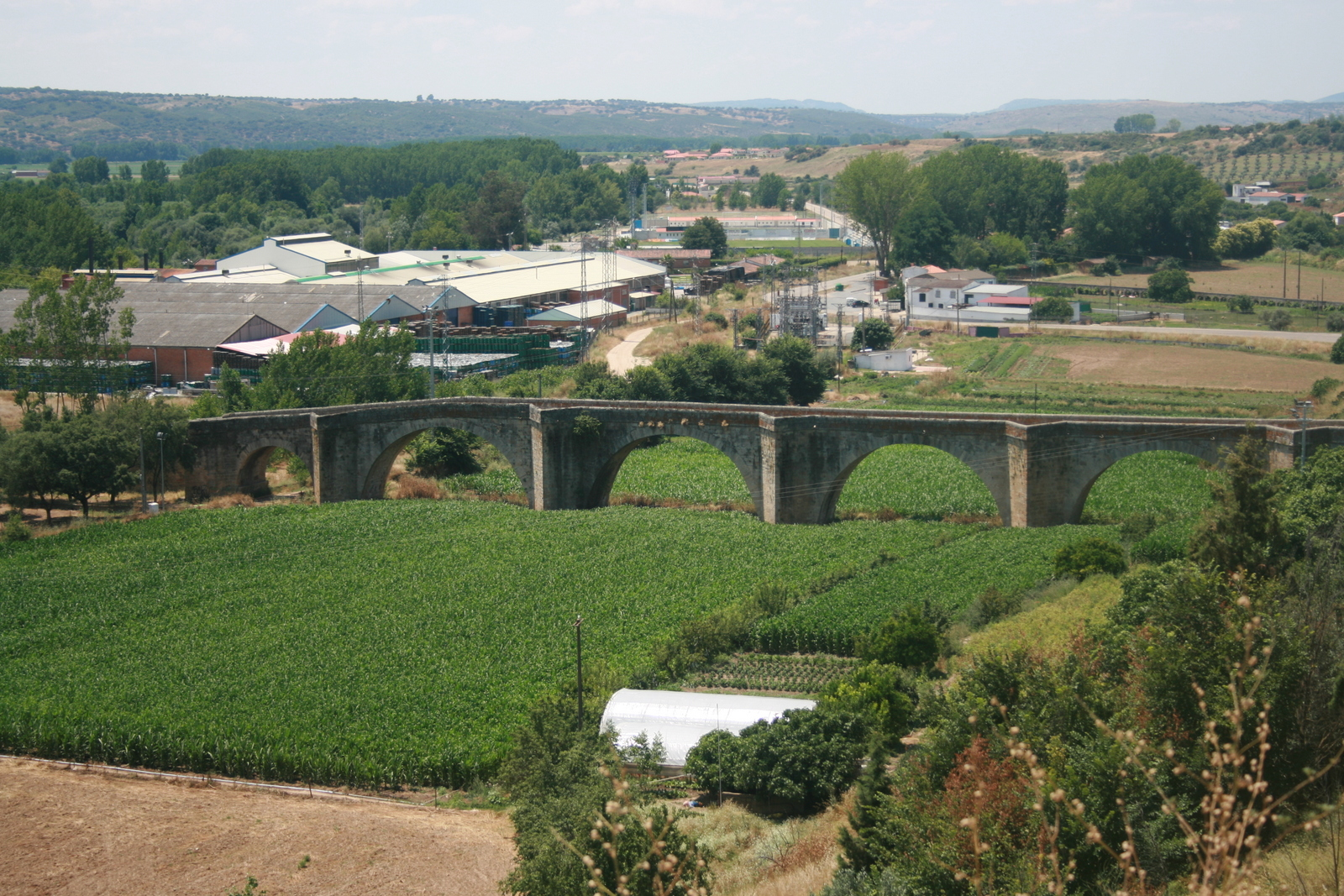
Coria old bridge

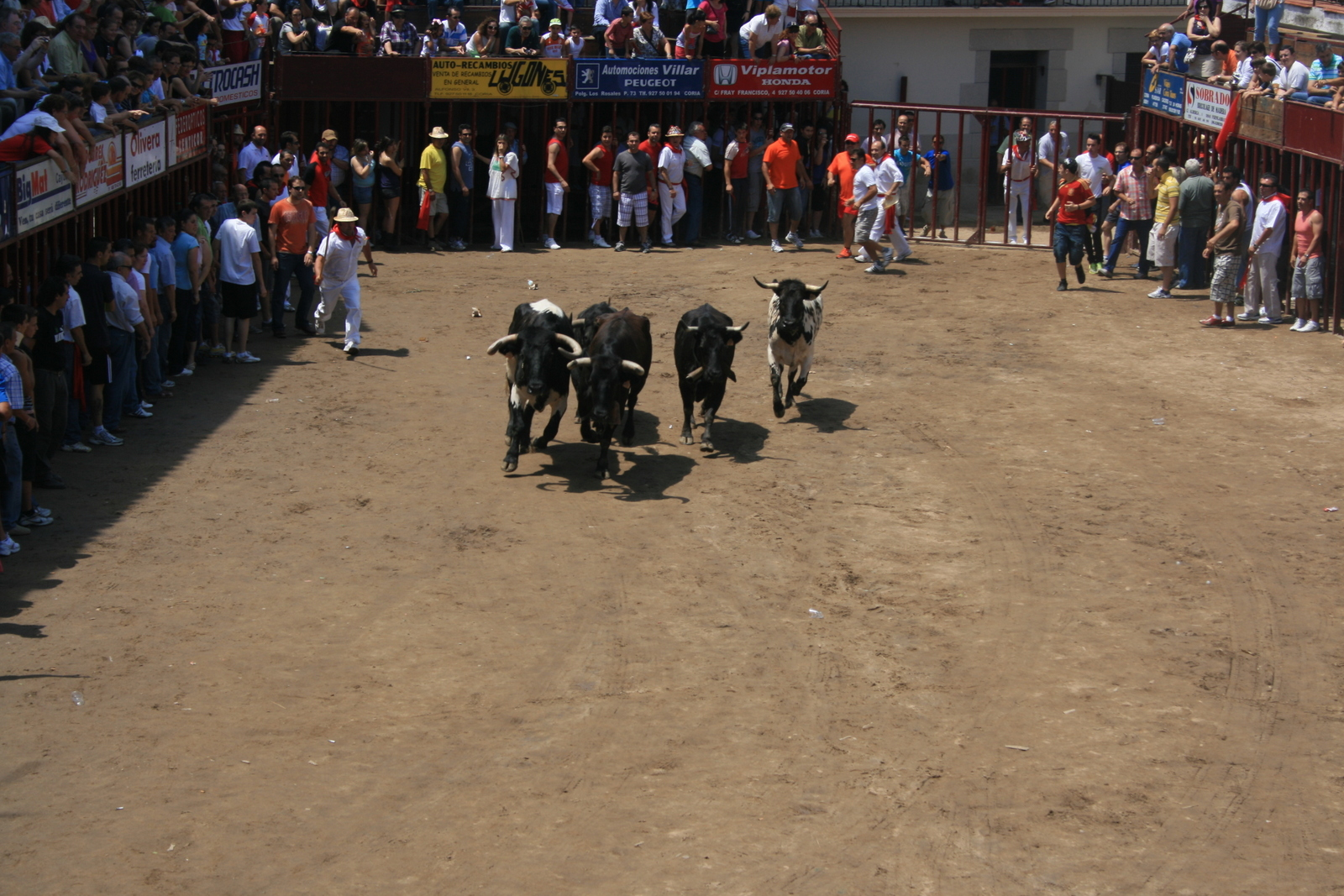
Coria bull-running square

== Symbols ==
In November 2012, Coria's Ayuntamiento (city council) approved unanimously in a plenary session the process for creating a future municipal flag for the city. As part of that process, a supporting historical record was to be created containing a proposed design for the flag of Coria that reflected the municipality's history and followed the rules of heraldry.

== See also ==
- Roman Catholic Diocese of Coria-Cáceres
- List of municipalities in Cáceres
