= Rodrigo Manrique de Lara =

Spanish noble

Jorge Manrique
- Cross of the Order of Santiago

1st Count of Paredes de Nava
- In office 1406–1476
- Monarch: John II of Castile
- Succeeded by: Pedro Manrique de Lara y Figueroa

45th Grand Master of the Order of Santiago
- In office 1474–1476
- Preceded by: Juan Pacheco
- Succeeded by: Ferdinand II of Aragon

Personal details
- Born: Jorge Manrique de Lara; 1406
- Died: November 11, 1476 (aged 69–70) Ocaña, Spain
- Parents: Pedro Manrique de Lara y Mendoza (father); Leonor de Castilla (mother)
- Relatives: House of Lara

Military service
- Battles/wars: First Battle of Olmedo

Rodrigo Manrique de Lara (1406 – November 11, 1476, Ocaña, Spain) was a rebellious Spanish noble who gained notoriety for his prowess in the Reconquista battles against the Muslim invaders. He sided with the Infantes of Aragon during their war against John II of Castile and Álvaro de Luna. He held the title of the first Count of Paredes de Nava and was the Grand Master of the Order of Santiago for the Kingdom of Castile.

== Family origins ==
Rodrigo was the son of Pedro Manrique de Lara y Mendoza, VIII Señor of Amusco and Treviño and Adelantado Mayor of Castile, and his wife, Leonor de Castilla y Alburquerque. His brother was Gómez Manrique, the poet and playwright.

The Manrique line of the House of Lara, also known as the House of Manrique de Lara constituted one of the most powerful noble families in Medieval Spain, holding amongst their titles the Dukedom of Nájera and the Marquesado de Aguilar de Campoo. In 1520, when Charles I of Spain first recognized the original 25 Grandes de Espana, their house was amply represented amongst the list.

== Biography ==
Rodrigo spent the bulk of his life in conflict with his arch enemy, Álvaro de Luna, in defense of his possessions and titles.

He entered into the Order of Santiago in 1418 at the age of 12. In 1434, he assisted in the taking of the city of Huéscar and was one of the ranking thirteen members of the order by 1440. In May 1452, he was named the first Count of Paredes de Nava by order of King John II of Castile.

After John II's death in 1454, he began to actively participate in the noble league fighting against Henry IV of Castile. In 1445, he fought in the First Battle of Olmedo against Alvaro de Luna who supported Henry IV. A year later in 1465, he participated in the so-called Farce of Ávila where a group of Castilian nobles symbolically executed an effigy of Henry IV and proclaimed his half brother, Alfonso of Castile, better known as "Alfonso the Innocent", to be the lawful king. The ceremony was called the "Farce of Avila" by contemporary critics and the name has thus passed into history. For his participation in the "Farce", he received the title of Constable of Castile.

After the death of Alfonso the Innocent in 1468, Rodrigo, being the constant rebel, supported the claim of princess Isabella who would later become Isabella I of Castile. He was present for the signing of the Treaty of the Bulls of Guisando which officially recognized Henry IV of Castile as the lawful king and his sister Isabella as the heir to the throne. However, this treaty also ousted Joanna la Beltraneja from the line of succession, a move that would later lay the foundation for the Castilian War of Succession.

In 1474, with the ascension to the throne of his patron, Isabella I of Castile, Rodrigo was named Grand Master of the Order of Santiago in the town of Uclés. The title of Grand Mastership over the order had been split into two halves that year after their predecessor, Juan Pacheco, the Marquis of Villena, renounced his title in favor of his son, Diego López de Pacheco y Portocarrero. This type of succession for the Grand Mastership of Santiago was incorrect as the title was traditionally one obtained by election and not by inheritance. This kicked off a power struggle amongst the nobles of the order and led to a confrontation between Rodrigo Manrique de Lara, and Don Alonso de Cárdenas. The result of this power struggle was a period of time in which the order had two different Grand Masters, one for Castile and one for Leon. King Ferdinand II of Aragon stepped into the argument and mediated this division which ended upon the death of Pedro Manrique two years later in 1476.

== Marriage and descendants ==
In 1431, Rodrigo Manrique married Mencía de Figueroa Laso de Vega, a member of the House of Lasso de la Vega and the House of Figueroa. She was the daughter of Gómez I Suárez de Figueroa and the granddaughter of Lorenzo I Suárez de Figueroa, a previous Grand Master of the Order of Santiago.

They had :

- Pedro Manrique de Lara y Figueroa: Primary heir to his father's titles, Second Conde of Paredes de Nava, Señor of Villapalacios, Villaverde de Guadalimar, Bienservida, Riópar, Cotillas and San Vicente, Commander of Segura and one of the thirteen leading members of the Order of Santiago.
- Rodrigo Manrique de Lara y Figueroa: Señor of Ibros, Commander of Yeste and Taibilla, One of the thirteen ruling members of the Order of Santiago, alcaide of Pucherna, Corregidor of the cities of Baza, Guadix, Almería, Purchena and Vera, Ambassador to Portugal, and Mayordomo Mayor of Queen Juana, whilst she was an infanta.
- Diego Manrique de Lara y Figueroa: Died young.
- Jorge Manrique de Lara y Figueroa: Señor of Belmontejo, Commander of Montizón and Chiclana, one of the thirteen ruling members of the Order of Santiago, Captain of the men at arms of the Guardia de Castilla, universal poet, and writer of the "Coplas por la muerte de su padre", about his father Rodrigo.
- Fadrique Manrique de Lara y Figueroa: Captain of the men at arms of the Guardia de Castilla, Chief Justice of Úbeda.
- Leonor Manrique de Lara y Figueroa: Señora of the villa of San Román.
- Elvira Manrique de Lara y Figueroa: Señora of Frómista.

== Death and legacy ==
Rodrigo Manrique died on November 11, 1476, in the town of Ocaña, Spain.

His epitaph reads "Here lies a man, who left his name alive". The Spanish reads as follows:

Aquí yace un hombre / que vivo dejó su nombre

Aside from his own prominent position in history, Rodrigo Manrique remains immortalized by the poem written by his son, Jorge Manrique de Lara, the "Coplas por la muerte de su padre".

In the 18th century, his County of Paredes de Nava was merged with many others under the House of Manrique de Lara including the Dukedom of Nájera and the Marquesado de Aguilar de Campóo.

== See also ==
- Order of Santiago
- List of grand masters of the Order of Santiago
- House of Lara
- House of Manrique de Lara

Preceded by Juan Pacheco	Grand Master of the Order of Santiago; 1474–1476	Succeeded by Ferdinand II of Aragon
