= Joanna la Beltraneja =

Queen of Portugal and claimant to the Castilian throne (1462–1530)

Joanna of Castile
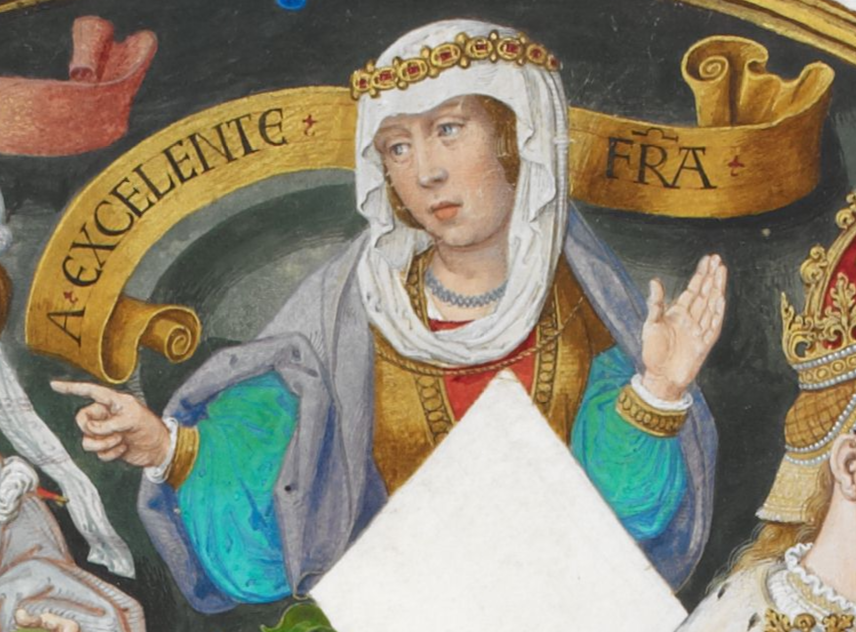
- Queen Joana in Genealogia dos Reis de Portugal (António de Holanda; 1530–1534)

Queen consort of Portugal
- Tenure: 30 May 1475 – 11 November 1477
- Tenure: 15 November 1477 – 28 August 1481
- Born: 28 February 1462; Royal Alcázar of Madrid, Castile
- Died: 12 April 1530 (aged 68); Lisbon, Portugal
- Spouse: Alfonso V of Portugal (m. 1475; died 1481)
- House: Trastámara
- Father: Disputed: Henry IV of Castile or Beltrán de la Cueva, 1st Duke of Alburquerque
- Mother: Joan of Portugal

Joanna of Castile, (Note: Her name in Spanish is Juana.) known as la Beltraneja (28 February 1462 – 12 April 1530), was a claimant to the throne of Castile, and Queen of Portugal as the wife of King Afonso V, her uncle.

== Early life ==
King Henry IV of Castile married Joan of Portugal, daughter of King Edward of Portugal and the youngest sister of King Afonso V of Portugal, on 21 May 1455. (Note: Henry IV had previously been married to Blanche II of Navarre. After thirteen years, that marriage was annulled on the grounds that it had never been consummated. To prove that the fault lay with Blanche and not Henry, a number of prostitutes from Segovia were brought to testify that Henry was sexually competent.) Seven years later, on 28 February 1462, Joanna was born at the Royal Alcazar of Madrid. Her birth was celebrated across Castile with street celebrations, banquets, and bullfights. On 9 May 1462, she was officially proclaimed heir to the throne of Castile and created Princess of Asturias.

=== Disputed heir to the throne ===
In 1464, Beltrán de la Cueva, a royal favorite, was awarded mastership of the Order of Santiago, angering a faction of the Castilian nobility headed by Juan Pacheco, Alfonso Carrillo de Acuña, and Pedro Girón. Desiring to depose Henry IV, undermine the rights of Joanna, and establish her half-uncle, Infante Alfonso, on the throne, Pacheco and his followers circulated rumors that Infanta Joanna was actually the child of Beltrán de la Cueva. Henry's opponents soon began referring to the infanta as "la Beltraneja", a mocking reference to her supposed illegitimacy. (Note: Susannah Ferreira writes that at the time of Joanna's birth, "there were no rumors of her mother's infidelity or her father's impotence." Such accusations first began to spread during the rebellion against Henry IV in 1464 and were first chronicled by Alfonso de Palencia under the patronage of Isabella I in 1474. In 1946, an examination of Henry IV's skeleton performed by Gregorio Maranon and Manuel Gómez-Moreno Martínez revealed him to be "normally virile." However, there is no way to prove his biological relationship with Joanna because the monastery her remains were stored in was destroyed in the Lisbon earthquake of 1755.)

In September of 1464, Pacheco assembled his allies at Burgos and published a manifesto condemning Henry IV's mismanagement and the excessive privileges granted to Beltrán de la Cueva. Formally alleging that Joanna was illegitimate and fathered by Beltrán, they demanded, among other things, that Henry recognize Alfonso as his heir. Henry yielded to the demands of the nobles and designated Alfonso his successor, with the stipulation that the infante eventually marry Joanna to ensure that they both would receive the crown.

However, Henry hesitated to fulfill all of the magnates' wishes, especially with regards to government reform, causing relations to sour. In February 1465, he renounced Alfonso as his heir, commanded Beltrán to mobilize a royal army, and ordered Infanta Joanna, Queen Joan, and his younger half-sister Isabella to be moved to Segovia under heavy guard. Civil war broke out in June 1465 after Carrillo, Pacheco, and other agitators conducted a ceremonial deposition-in-effigy of Henry outside the city of Avila and crowned Alfonso as a rival king. Around this time, Henry's opponents began to contest Joanna's legitimacy on the grounds that her parents never received the necessary papal dispensation for marriage within four degrees of consanguinity. In 1467, the nobles clashed with Henry's forces at the Second Battle of Olmedo, which concluded as a draw.

After rebels captured Segovia in 1467, a six-month truce was agreed to that arranged for the royal treasury and jewels to be returned to Henry's safekeeping in exchange for Joanna's mother, Queen Joan, to live at Archbishop Fonseca's castle as a guarantee. While there, Queen Joan had an affair with Fonseca's nephew and bore two sons. Her indisputable status as an adulteress would later serve to weaken Henry IV's bargaining power.

Alfonso died suddenly at the age of fourteen in July 1468. His claim as heir to the throne of Castile was inherited by his sister (Joanna's half-aunt), Isabella. (Note: Isabella had been liberated from Henry's control during the capture of Segovia in October or September 1467.) However, support for the rebels had begun to wane, and Isabella preferred a negotiated settlement to continuing the war. In September 1468, she met with her elder half-brother Henry at Toros de Guisando and they reached a compromise known as the Treaty of the Bulls of Guisando. The treaty stipulated that the war would stop, King Henry would name Isabella his heir presumptive instead of Joanna, and Isabella would not marry without her half-brother's consent, but he would not be able to force her to marry against her will. Henry also promised to obtain a divorce from Queen Joan. Because of Henry's affection for the Infanta Joanna, there were concerns about his actual willingness to relinquish her rights and he was accused of intending to evade the terms of the compromise.

Outraged at the Treaty of Guisando, a faction of the nobility led by the powerful Mendoza family began rallying for Joanna's cause. Íñigo López de Mendoza, 1st Count of Tendilla, who had been appointed guardian of Joanna by Henry in 1465, distributed a letter to Castile's most powerful barons condemning the settlement and issued a formal protest to Pope Paul II. Following negotiations with Pacheco's rival party, the two factions agreed to a double marriage in which Joanna would marry Afonso V of Portugal's son and heir, John, and Isabella would marry Afonso. As explained by Nancy Stuart:

Should Isabella produce a male heir, he would inherit the Castilian crown. Should she, however, fail and La Beltraneja deliver a male, that child would become the next king of Castile. By this compromise, Castile’s dynastic line was thus hinged on biological chance. For Pacheco, it was a brilliant achievement, for in one stroke he had neatly undercut Isabella’s prospective marriage to Ferdinand and disposed of her in a Portuguese match. In another, he had reconciled the Mendozas to the king and provided Princess Juana with a chance to compete dynastically for the crown.

However, Isabella refused to consent to the arrangement and instead married Ferdinand of Aragon in 1469. Henry IV denounced the marriage and issued a proclamation stating that by marrying without his permission, Isabella violated the Treaty of Guisando and was therefore no longer his successor. Concerned that disinheriting Isabella would provoke the anger of Aragon, Henry IV sought to ally France for support defending Joanna's claim.

In a double ceremony on 26 October 1470, Joanna was proclaimed legitimate heir to the throne and betrothed to Charles, Duke of Berry, brother of Louis XI. On 8 December, Henry IV wrote to Charles urging him to dispatch troops to Castile. Charles, in conflict with Louis and disturbed by reports that Joanna was illegitimate, ultimately chose not to. In summer 1471, Charles sent an envoy to Pope Paul II requesting to dissolve his betrothal to Joanna. (Note: Charles instead sought the hand of Mary of Burgundy, in an effort to align himself more with the Duke of Burgundy, an enemy of his brother. Before any plans were cemented, Charles died unmarried in 1472.)

After a few unsettled arrangements, which included French and Burgundian princes, Joanna was promised in marriage to her maternal uncle, King Afonso V of Portugal, who swore to defend her (and his own) rights to the Crown of Castile.

== Throne claimant ==
When Henry died in 1474, Joanna was recognized as queen by some noble factions, while others preferred her half-aunt Isabella as queen. This began the four-year War of the Castilian Succession.

In addition to the King of Portugal, Joanna was supported by some of the high Castilian nobility and by descendants of Portuguese families that had settled in Castile after 1396: the Archbishop of Toledo (Alfonso Carrillo de Acuña); the 2nd Duke of Escalona, a powerful and wealthy nobleman; the Estúñiga family, with lands bordering Portugal; the Marquess of Cádiz; and the Grand Master of the Order of Calatrava, Rodrigo Téllez Girón.

Isabella was supported by Ferdinand of Aragon (whom she married), and by most of the Castilian nobility and clergy: the powerful House of Mendoza; the Manrique de Lara family; the 2nd Duke of Medina Sidonia; the 1st Duke of Alburquerque; the Order of Santiago; and the Order of Calatrava, except its Grand Master.

On 10 May 1475, King Afonso V of Portugal invaded Castile and married Joanna in Plasencia, 15 days later, making her Queen of Portugal. Joanna and Afonso V held court at Toro, and she was considered a promising ruler by her courtiers, though too young. Joanna sent a letter to the cities of Castile, expounding the wish of her father King Henry IV that she should rule, and proposed that the cities vote for which succession they wished should be recognized. However, Joanna found fewer supporters than expected. Very shortly, Isabella I's husband led her forces against the armies of Joanna and Afonso V.

Both armies met at Toro (1 March 1476). King Afonso V was beaten by the left and center of Ferdinand's army, and fled from the battlefield. His son Prince John of Portugal defeated the Castilian right wing, recovered the lost Portuguese Royal standard, and held the field, but overall the battle was indecisive. Even so, the prestige of Joanna and Afonso V dissolved because Ferdinand sent messages to all the cities of Castile and to several other kingdoms informing them about a huge victory where the Portuguese were crushed. Faced with this news, the party of Joanna la Beltraneja, who was under siege at the Royal Alcazar, was terminated, and the Portuguese were forced to return to their kingdom.

"That is the battle of Toro. The Portuguese army had not been exactly defeated; however, the sensation was that Donna Joanna's cause had completely sunk. It made sense that for the Castilians, Toro was considered as divine retribution, the compensation willed by God for the terrible disaster of Aljubarrota, still alive in the Castilian memory."

After this, Joanna's husband Afonso tried without success to form an alliance with Louis XI of France. In 1478, the marriage of Joanna and Afonso V was annulled by Pope Sixtus IV on grounds of consanguinity, ending her tenure as Queen of Portugal. She was also forced to renounce the title of Queen of Castile.

== Later life ==
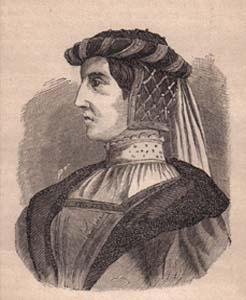
Portrait of Joanna.

In 1479, Afonso renounced his pretension to the Castilian Crown and signed the Treaty of Alcáçovas with Isabella and Ferdinand. Joanna was given a choice: enter a convent, or marry Isabella's one-year-old son John when he came of age (and if he then consented). Joanna chose to enter the Convent of Santa Clara in Coimbra. In August 1480, just weeks before Joanna professed her vows, Afonso V wrote to her and addressed her as his niece rather than his wife, an implicit acknowledgment that their marriage had been annulled. The King died in 1481.

For royal women, the profession of vows did not necessarily rule out the possibility of marriage, prompting Ferdinand and Isabella to lobby the Holy See to ensure that Joanna adhered to her vows. In 1482, Afonso's successor, John II, began considering wedding Joanna to King Francis Phoebus of Navarre, nephew of Louis XI of France. However, his plans were circumvented when Francis died in January 1483. In March of the same year, John was asked to swear an oath to Isabella's ambassadors that he would not permit Joanna to marry, leave Portugal, or forgo monastic life. To further minimize the prospect of Joanna remarrying, the Catholic Monarchs sent a letter to Pope Sixtus IV on 3 June 1483 requesting that he issue a bull that would prevent Joanna from leaving the convent.

In 1498, Joanna was provided with a new household. The annual income with which she supported her household was one of the highest among members of the Portuguese aristocracy during the reign of Manuel I.

After Isabella's death in 1504, Ferdinand was advised to marry Joanna in order to retain control of Castile, rather than have his son-in-law Philip succeed there. In response to the marriage plan, Manuel I moved Joanna to the royal court and placed her under guard, wanting to remain on friendly terms with Philip I.

In 1522, Joanna relinquished her title as queen of Castile and offered the crown to John III of Portugal, citing her age and inability to produce an heir as reasons for her abdication.

Joanna signed her letters "La Reina" ("the Queen"), until she died. She would become known in Portugal as "A Excelente Senhora" ("the Excellent Lady"). She died in Lisbon.

== In fiction ==
- Juana la Beltraneja, a play by Santiago Sevilla (Humanities Portal of Liceus.com). The depiction of Juan Pacheco and Beltrán de la Cueva shows the pernicious influence of certain members of the nobility towards princess Joanna.
- Isabel, a Spanish television series about Isabella I of Castile, which includes Joanna (Isabella's niece). Joanna is played by Carmen Sánchez.
- The Queen's Cross, A Biographical Romance of Queen Isabella of Spain by Lawrence Schoonover, includes the figure of Joanna la Beltraneja in its story. This historical novel was published by William Sloane Associates, Inc. (New York), 1955.
- Jean Plaidy's Spain trilogy provides viewpoints from Isabella, Ferdinand and La Beltraneja, especially in book 2 "Spain for the Sovereigns".

== Notes ==
Joanna la Beltraneja House of Trastámara Born: 1462 Died: 1530
Portuguese royalty
Vacant Title last held by Isabella of Coimbra	Queen consort of Portugal; 30 May 1475 – 11 November 1477	Succeeded by Eleanor of Viseu
Preceded by Eleanor of Viseu	Queen consort of Portugal; 15 November 1477 – 28 August 1481	Succeeded by Eleanor of Viseu
Spanish royalty
Preceded by Prince Henry	Princess of Asturias; 1462–1464	Succeeded by Infante Alfonso
Preceded by Infanta Isabella	Princess of Asturias; 1470–1474	Succeeded by Infanta Isabella
