= Battle of Olmedo =

The Battle of Olemdo can refer to either of two battles fought near Olmedo in Castile (now in the province of Valladolid, Spain):

- First Battle of Olmedo (1445)
- Second Battle of Olmedo (1467)
