= Juan Pacheco =

Castilian noble (1419–1474)

Cross of the Order of Santiago.

Juan Pacheco, Marquess of Villena (1419 – 4 October 1474), was a nobleman and politician in fifteenth-century Castile whose career significantly influenced the reign of Henry IV of Castile. As the favorite, advisor and Mayordomo mayor to the future king, Pacheco accumulated numerous titles, offices, and territories, establishing himself as the dominant political figure of his era. Initially a close ally of the crown, he later led the aristocratic opposition to royal authority, including support for the symbolic deposition of Henry IV during the civil conflicts of the 1460s. As a skilled and pragmatic political strategist, Pacheco shifted alliances multiple times, supporting Infante Alfonso, then Isabella I of Castile, and ultimately Princess Joanna, to preserve and expand his influence. By his death in 1474, he had amassed one of the largest noble estates in Castile and elevated his family into the ranks of the high aristocracy. His titles included Marquess of Villena, 1st Duke of Escalona, and Master of the Order of Santiago.

== Biography ==
Pacheco spent his early years in Belmonte before entering court life. The exact dates are uncertain but Pacheco's father probably sent him into the service of Constable Álvaro de Luna around 1428. Sometime between 1435 and 1440, he joined the household of the heir apparent, Prince Enrique (the future Enrique IV). He promptly gained the prince’s confidence and established a relationship that was the foundation of his swift rise to prominence.

Pacheco spent his early years in Belmonte before entering court life. The exact dates are uncertain but, Pacheco's father probably sent him into the service of Constable Álvaro de Luna around 1428. Sometime between 1435 and 1440, he joined the household of the heir apparent, Prince Enrique (the future Enrique IV). He promptly gained the prince’s confidence and established a relationship that was the foundation of his rise to prominence.

Pacheco’s success was furthered by strategic alliances and advantageous marriages. Initially wed to Angelina de Luna, a relative of the powerful royal favorite Álvaro de Luna, he later secured an annulment and married María Portocarrero, daughter of a prominent noble family with connections to the Admiral of Castile. By the early 1440s, he had accumulated important court offices, including membership in the Royal Council and the position of Chief Chamberlain. His elevation culminated in 1445, following the Battle of Olmedo, when he was granted the title of Marquis of Villena, which entailed vast territorial holdings in strategically important regions near the Aragonese frontier. This marked his definitive emergence as a major figure in Castilian politics.

In the final years of John II's reign, Pacheco consolidated his power by acquiring additional offices and lands. He managed the prince’s revenues, served as Chief Magistrate of Castile, and expanded his domain through acquisitions such as Villarrobledo. Pacheco exerted significant influence over Prince Henry, shaping his political decisions. This influence contributed to the growing estrangement between the prince and Álvaro de Luna. Pacheco encouraged Henry’s opposition to the royal favorite, whose downfall and execution in 1453 eliminated a major rival. Upon John II’s death in 1454 and Henry’s accession, Pacheco was widely recognized as the most influential nobleman in Castile.

Despite his early dominance, Pacheco’s position at court proved unstable. Henry IV increasingly favored other courtiers, including Miguel Lucas de Iranzo, Juan de Valenzuela, and Beltrán de la Cueva, whose rise diminished Pacheco’s influence. In response, Pacheco gradually distanced himself from the king and led the noble opposition. Unlike Álvaro de Luna, who sought to strengthen royal authority, Pacheco’s actions were driven by his own pursuit of power and wealth. Still, his political skill kept him central in Castilian affairs, sometimes eclipsing the king. Between 1455 and 1461, he joined military campaigns against the Emirate of Granada and controlled the machinery of government, gaining additional titles such as Count of Xiquena and Marquis of Los Vélez, and holding offices including Chief Justice of Segovia and Chief Magistrate of Asturias.

As Henry IV relied more on new favorites, tensions with Pacheco grew. Although the marquis initially maintained a facade of loyalty, he began conspiring with other nobles dissatisfied with royal authority. His duplicity nearly led to his arrest in 1460, but he avoided capture and temporarily reconciled with the king. By the early 1460s, Pacheco had openly aligned with the nobility against Henry IV, ostensibly to counter Beltrán de la Cueva’s influence but more fundamentally as part of a broader struggle between aristocratic and royal power.

In 1464, the noble faction led by Pacheco forced Henry IV to accept significant concessions, effectively imposing aristocratic control over the monarchy. When the king attempted to reassert his authority, the nobles responded with open rebellion. In 1465, they staged the symbolic deposition of Henry IV in what became known as the Farce of Avila and proclaimed Henry's half-brother, Infante Alfonso, as king. Pacheco played a central role in this unprecedented act, which plunged Castile into civil war. Initially, the rebel faction enjoyed considerable success, controlling much of the kingdom. However, the conflict soon turned against them. The death of Pacheco’s brother, Pedro Girón, in 1466 deprived the rebels of an essential ally. For a time, Pacheco stepped away to assume responsibility for his brother’s estates and the guardianship of his nephews. During the turmoil of civil war, Pacheco seized the Grand Mastership of the Order of Santiago. This was one of the most prestigious offices in Castile, bringing great wealth and authority. The administration of the Grand Mastership had belonged to the Infante Alfonso, but upon his proclamation as king at Avila, it became vacant, and Juan Pacheco seized the opportunity. In 1467, he orchestrated his selection by the electors of the Order. However, while he was preoccupied with the matter of the Mastership of Santiago, the Second Battle of Olmedo took place in his absence. There, the royalists achieved a significant victory against the faction of Infante Alfonso. The Infante's sudden death in 1468 left the opposition without a clear leader.

Following this loss, Pacheco attempted to rally support around the king’s half-sister, Isabella (later Isabella I), but she declined to be proclaimed queen, instead accepting recognition as heir apparent. The resulting compromise between Henry IV and the nobility was formalized in 1468 with the Treaty of the Bulls of Guisando, which acknowledged Isabella as the king’s successor but required that she marry only with the king's consent. Pacheco subsequently reconciled with Henry IV and returned to royal service, once again seeking to dominate the government. During this period, he secured confirmation of his titles and estates, including the Marquisate of Villena and the Mastership of Santiago, and acquired additional possessions including the castle and town of Escalona, later elevated to a duchy.

Pacheco’s political stance shifted again in 1469 when Isabella married Ferdinand of Aragon without Henry IV's consent. Fearing that Ferdinand might reclaim the marquisate of Villena due to prior Aragonese ownership, Pacheco abandoned his support for Isabella and instead championed the cause of Henry IV’s daughter, Joanna. He sought to arrange her marriage to King Afonso V of Portugal, hoping to secure his own territorial interests. In 1470, he successfully persuaded Henry IV to revoke Isabella’s status as heir and recognize Joanna instead. By this time, however, Pacheco’s health was deteriorating, and he began to make provisions for his death, including the establishment of entailed estates for his sons.

In his final years, Pacheco continued to expand his holdings and influence. He remarried after the death of María Portocarrero in 1472 and secured additional grants, including the important town of Trujillo. Although resistance delayed his control of this territory, he eventually took possession of it shortly before his death.

Juan Pacheco died on October 4, 1474, in Santa Cruz de la Sierra. His remains were initially interred in the Monastery of Guadalupe before being transferred to the Monastery of Santa María del Parral in Segovia, where he had established a family pantheon.

== Marriages and offspring ==
Juan Pacheco married three times, each marriage reflecting his strategy of consolidating political alliances and strengthening his social position within the Castilian nobility.

His first marriage, in 1436, was to Angelina de Luna, a cousin of the powerful royal favorite Álvaro de Luna. This union aligned Pacheco with one of the most influential figures at court during the reign of John II. However, the marriage was later annulled in 1442, allowing Pacheco to pursue a more advantageous alliance.
That same year, he married María Portocarrero, daughter of Pedro Portocarrero, Lord of Moguer, and the granddaughter of the Admiral of Castile, Alfonso Enríquez. This second marriage significantly enhanced Pacheco’s connections to some of the most important noble lineages in Castile and coincided with his rapid political ascent. María Portocarrero remained his principal consort for three decades until her death in 1472.
Shortly thereafter, Pacheco married for a third time, taking as his wife María de Velasco, a daughter of Pedro Fernández de Velasco, 2nd Count of Haro from the Velasco family, another prominent noble house.

Pacheco had nineteen children, both legitimate and illegitimate. His offspring played an important role in consolidating the family’s rise into the high aristocracy through inheritance, ecclesiastical careers, and strategic marriages.

- Diego López Pacheco, his eldest son, succeeded to his father’s principal titles and political role. Diego continued his father’s policies, particularly in initially opposing the accession of Ferdinand of Aragon and Isabella of Castile to the throne.

Other legitimate children had notable careers and/or forged marriage alliances with other noble families.

- Pedro Pacheco (died 1519) (pt), 8th Lord of Moguer and 6th Lord of Villanueva del Fresno, married Juana de Cárdenas, daughter of Alonso de Cárdenas. Had issue.
- Alonso Téllez Girón y Pacheco inherited the lordship of Belmonte and founded a significant cadet branch of the family.
- Juan Pacheco (the younger) and Rodrigo Pacheco are also attested among his legitimate sons, though they played less prominent roles politically.
- Beatriz Pacheco, married Rodrigo Ponce de León, Duke of Cádiz.
- Maria Pacheco the elder, married Rodrigo Alonso Pimentel, 1st Duke of Benavente.
- Mencia Pacheco, married Diego de Cárdenas y Enríquez, 1st Duke of Maqueda.
- Catalina Pacheco, married Alfonso Fernández de Córdoba, 6th Lord of Aguilar.
- Francisca Pacheco, married Íñigo López de Mendoza y Quiñones, 1st Marquis of Mondéjar.
- Maria Pacheco the younger, married Fernando Álvarez de Toledo y Zúñiga, 1st Count of Oropesa.

Pacheco also had several illegitimate children. While fewer details survive about them, some were acknowledged and integrated into the broader family network. His natural sons would receive minor lordships, enter military service, or pursue ecclesiastical careers, while his natural daughters were provided with dowries and incomes. Though they did not inherit the principal titles, they still contributed to extending the family’s influence.

== See also ==
- Pedro de Portocarrero (conquistador)

== Bibliography ==
- Barquero Goñi, Carlos. "Juan Pacheco". Real Academia de la Historia (in Spanish).
- Corral Sánchez, Nuria (2022-05-04). "The "destroyer of the realm:" Castilian chronicles and the de-legitimation of Juan Pacheco (d. 1474)". Journal of Medieval Iberian Studies. 14 (2): 276–297. doi:10.1080/17546559.2022.2076284. ISSN 1754-6559.
- Marino, Nancy F. (2006). Don Juan Pacheco: wealth and power in late medieval Spain. Medieval and Renaissance texts and studies. Tempe, Ariz: ACMRS (Arizona Center for Medieval and Renaissance Studies). ISBN 978-0-86698-356-3.
- O'Callaghan, Joseph F. (1975). A history of medieval Spain. Ithaca: Cornell University Press. ISBN 978-0-8014-0880-9.
- Phillips, William D. (1978). Enrique IV and the crisis of fifteenth-century Castile, 1425-1480. Cambridge, Mass: Mediaeval Academy of America. ISBN 978-0-910956-63-5.

| Preceded by Alfonso of Castile | Grand Master of the Order of Santiago; 1467–1474 | Succeeded by Alonso de Cárdenas |
| Preceded by Ruy Díaz de Mendoza | Mayordomo mayor of the King of Castile; 1454–1472 | Succeeded by Diego López de Pacheco y Portocarrero |
Spanish nobility
| Preceded by New creation | Duke of Escalona; 1472–1474 | Succeeded by Diego López de Pacheco |
