= Rodrigo Íñiguez =

Spanish noble

Cross of the Order of Santiago.

Rodrigo Íñiguez was a Spanish noble and the fifteenth Grand Master of the Order of Santiago. His office lasted from 1237 to 1242 when he was succeeded by Paio Peres Correia. Before becoming the Grand Master, he was the military commander of Montánchez and the head commander of León.

In 1239, having already been elected as Grand Master of the order, Rodrigo presided over the general chamber where the members voted in favor of conquering some cities that remained in Moorish hands. It was in this chapter meeting that Rodrigo gave a passionate speech aimed at fanning the Crusader flames of Reconquista.

The army was made up of knights of the Order of Santiago and a great number of hired soldiers from Mérida. Their expedition focused on the re-conquest of the towns of Almendralejo, Usagre, Fuente del Maestre, and Llerena amongst others. After failing to take the Castillo de Reina due to its large fortress, they passed on to Guadalcanal, besieging the town until Axataf, the town's governor surrendered. It was in this year, 1241 which marked a high point in the power, organization, and land control of the Reconquista war.

Amongst the members of the Order of Santiago that participated in the campaign of don Rodrigo Íñiguez were the following; Rodrigo de Valverde; military commander of Estremera, Juan Muñiz de Gogoy; Lope Sánchez de Porras; Hernán Meléndez, commander of Almoguer, Rodrigo Yáñez; and the commander of Mora, Albar Martínez de Aibar or Ibarra.

Rodrigo voluntarily renounced his Grand Mastership over the order in 1242 for reasons unknown.

Preceded by Pedro González Mengo	Grand Master of the Order of Santiago; 1237–1242	Succeeded by Paio Peres Correia
