= Pedro Arias =

Grand Master of the Order of Santiago

Pedro Arias (died on 3 August 1212) was the seventh grand master of the Order of Santiago. He became the Master succeeding Fernando González de Marañón in 1210. On 16 July 1212, he fought in the Battle of Las Navas de Tolosa in a Christian Coalition including the Kingdom of Castile, Crown of Aragon and Kingdom of Navarre against the Almohad Caliphate. Despite the victory of the Coalition, the Master died of his wounds on 3 August of that year.

== Sources ==
- Browne Ayes, John J. (2010). Juan Ponce de Leon: His New and Revised Genealogy. John Browne Ayes. ISBN 9780557466535.
- Venning, Timothy; Frankopan, Peter (2015). A Chronology of the Crusades. Routledge. ISBN 9781317496434.

Preceded by Fernando González de Marañón	Grand Master of the Order of Santiago; 1210–1212	Succeeded by García González de Arauzo
