= Samora Correia =

City and parish in Portugal

- Civil parish
- Aerial view of Samora Correia in 2025

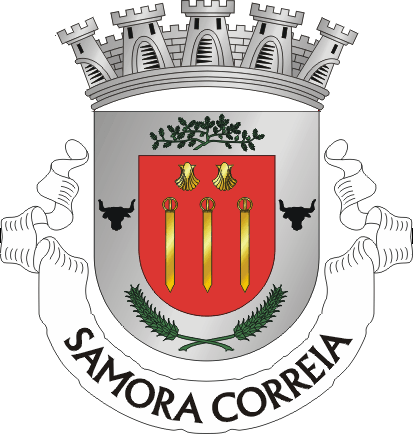
- Coat of arms

- Location in Portugal
- Coordinates: 38°55′34″N 8°52′15″W
- Country: Portugal
- Region: Centro
- Intermunic. comm.: Lezíria do Tejo
- District: Santarém
- Municipality: Benavente
- Established: 13th century

Area
  - Total: 321.39 km^{2} (124.09 sq mi)

Population (2021)
  - Total: 17,698
  - Density: 55.067/km^{2} (142.62/sq mi)
- Time zone: UTC+00:00 (WET)
  - Summer (DST): UTC+01:00 (WEST)
- Website: www.freguesiadesamoracorreia.pt

Samora Correia is a Portuguese city and seat of the Freguesia of Samora Correia, in the municipality of Benavente, inside the Santarém District. The freguesia (parish) has an area of 321,39 km^{2} and 17,698 inhabitants (2021 census), giving it a population density of 55.1 hab./km^{2}.

The slogan of the city is "Puro Ribatejo", or Pure Ribatejo.

In addition to the town itself, the parish comprises several urban and rural settlements, including Porto Alto, Arados and others. It borders the parishes of Benavente, Canha and Santo Estêvão to its north and east, the parish of Vila Franca de Xira to its west and the parishes of Alcochete and Poceirão e Marateca to its south. The natural boundary to the west of the region is the Almansor River.

It was a municipality between 1510 and 1836, when it was merged into Benavente following that year's administrative reform. It consisted of only one parish and it had, in 1801, 1173 inhabitants.

The parish's seat, Samora Correia, was given the status of city on 12 June 2009.

== Cronology ==
- 1186 – King Sancho I defines the boundaries of the Military Order of Aviz and Sant'Iago in the Samora Correia region, establishing the territory of the area.
- 1207 –The Belmonte fort is built, belonging to the Sant'Iago Order, establishing the first settlements in the region, still without major development.
- 1245-1252 – Documents indicate that there was already a settlement in the area known as Chacoteca or Charneca, which would later give rise to the city of Samora Correia.
- 1270 – The name Çamora is used for the first time, referring to an autonomous territory and an emerging settlement linked to the Sant'Iago Order.
- 1300 – The suffix Correya is added to Çamora, probably a homage to the city's founder, Paio Peres Correia.
- 1510 – Samora Correia receives it's foral, given to it by King Manuel I, officially becoming an established town.
- 1836 – The municipality of Samora Correia is extinct and annexed to the Benavente municipality, to whom it belongs to this day, following the 1836 Portuguese administrative reform, adopted after the conclusion of the Portuguese Civil War.
- 2009 – Samora Correia is given city status by the Government on 12 June, following a lengthy process of development and modernisation.

== Name Origin ==
The origin of the name Samora Correia does not hae a certain origin. The name Samora evolved from Çamora and it was the one of two names that raised the most questions and gave rise to the greatest number of theories. One of these suggests that it was named after a Moorish woman called Ça-a-moura (Ça the moorish woman), who lived in Samora Correia. Another theory points to another woman named Çamora, a relative of Paio Peres Correia, the town's founder. There are also those who believe that the name was a nickname given to the nobleman Pedro Afonso de Çamora. The most likely theory attributes the origin of the name Çamora to Paio Peres Correia, who is thought to have brought this name from Zamora, in Spain. The suffix Correia was very likely added to honour its founder, and the town then came to be officially known as Çamora Correya in the early 14th century. In 1830, the final change took place, as the letter Ç was replaced by an S, and the name became definitively Samora Correia.

== Culture and Sport ==
- Sociedade Filarmónica União Samorense (SFUS)
- Grupo Desportivo Samora Correia (GDSC)
- Núcleo de Andebol de Samora Correia (NASC)
- Associação Recreativa e Cultural Amigos de Samora (ARCAS)
- Iris FM - Radio
- Associação Jovens Samora Correia (AJSC)
- Centro Cultural de Samora Correia
- Associação Recreativa do Porto Alto (AREPA)

== Population ==
The population registered in the census was:

Population of the parish of Samora Correia
| Year | Pop. | ±% |
|---|---|---|
| 1864 | 1,880 | — |
| 1878 | 1,769 | −5.9% |
| 1890 | 1,786 | +1.0% |
| 1900 | 2,030 | +13.7% |
| 1911 | 2,541 | +25.2% |
| 1920 | 2,184 | −14.0% |
| 1930 | 3,490 | +59.8% |
| 1940 | 3,449 | −1.2% |
| 1950 | 4,466 | +29.5% |
| 1960 | 3,703 | −17.1% |
| 1970 | 5,298 | +43.1% |
| 1981 | 7,769 | +46.6% |
| 1991 | 9,470 | +21.9% |
| 2001 | 12,826 | +35.4% |
| 2011 | 17,123 | +33.5% |
| 2021 | 17,698 | +3.4% |

Distribution by Age Groups
| Age group | 0–14 | 15–24 | 25–64 | > 65 |
| 2001 | 2235 | 1754 | 7178 | 1659 |
| 2011 | 3158 | 1862 | 9684 | 2419 |
| 2021 | 2786 | 2073 | 9544 | 3295 |

== Settlements ==
Church of Arados seen in 2004

Besides the city of Samora Correia, the parish includes a few other settlements:

- Porto Alto
- Arados
- Murteira
- Catapereiro
- Pancas
- Belmonte
- Baracha
- Braço de Prata
- Adema

== Notable People ==
- Baron of Samora Correia
- Professor João Fernandes Pratas
- Camora (footballer)

== See also ==
- List of cities in Portugal
