= Alfonso, Prince of Asturias =

Alfonso, Prince of Asturias may refer to:

- Alfonso, Prince of Asturias (1453–1468), son of John II of Castile and Isabella of Portugal
- Alfonso XII of Spain (1857–1885), son of Isabella II of Spain and Francis, Duke of Cádiz
- Alfonso, Prince of Asturias (1907–1938), son of Alfonso XIII of Spain and Victoria Eugenie of Battenberg
