= Gómez Manrique =

Spanish poet, soldier, politician and dramatist

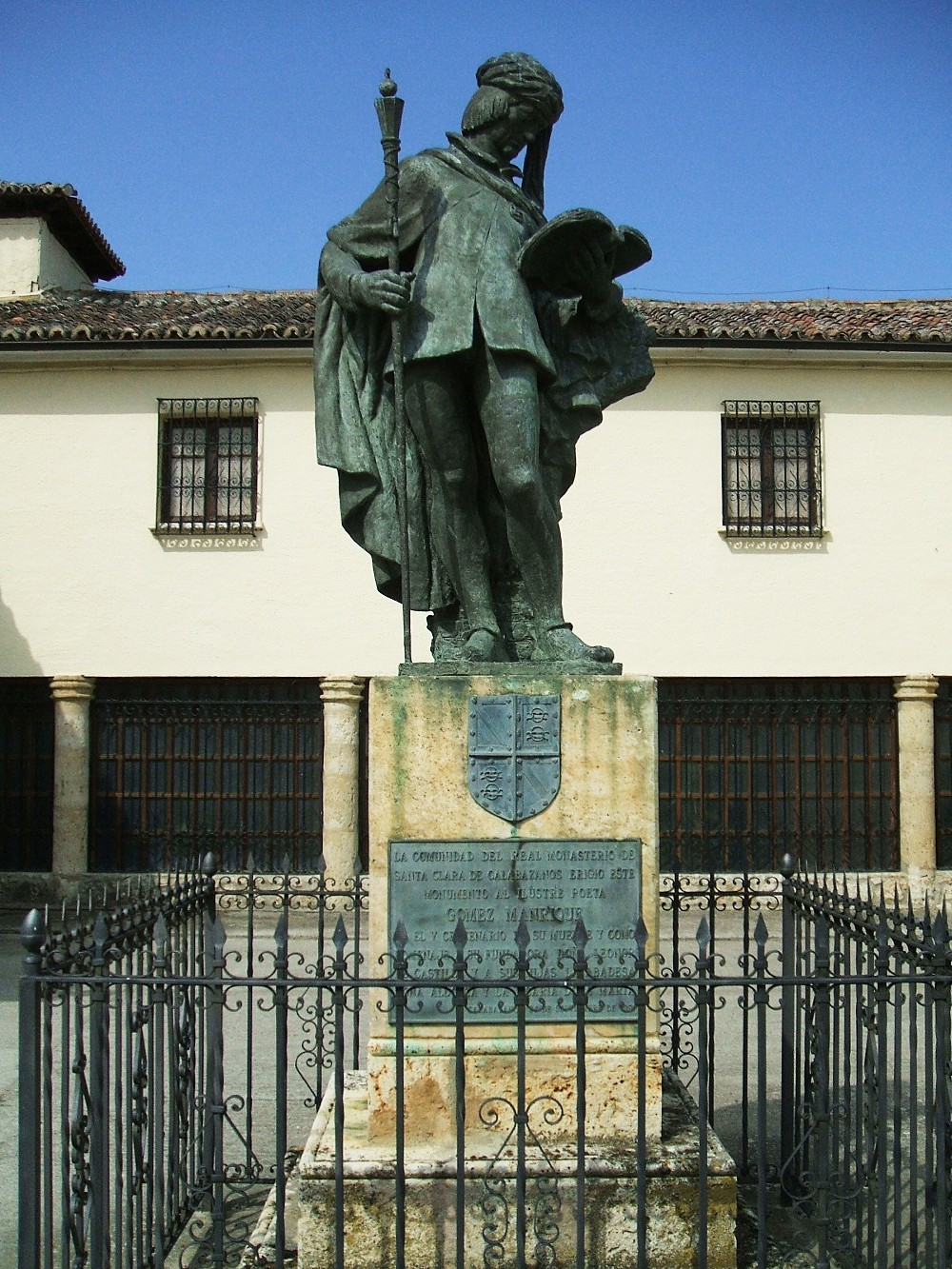
Statue of Diego Gómez Manrique, Castilla y León, Spain

Gómez Manrique y de Castilla (c. 1412 – c. 1490) was a Spanish poet, soldier, politician and dramatist.

== Biography ==
Gómez Manrique was born in Amusco. The fifth son of Pedro Manrique de Lara y Mendoza, (1382–1440), adelantado mayor of Leon. Gómez Manrique was introduced into public life at an early age, took a prominent part against the constable Alvaro de Luna during the reign of John II, went into opposition against Miguel Lucas de Iranzo in the reign of Henry IV, and declared in favor of the then infanta Isabel, soon to be Queen Isabel I of Castile, whose marriage with Ferdinand of Aragon, King Ferdinand II of Aragon, he promoted.

Besides being a distinguished soldier, Manrique acted as a moderating political influence and, when appointed corregidor of Toledo, was active in protecting the converted Jews from popular resentment. His will was signed on 31 May 1490, and he is known to have died before 16 February 1491.

Manrique inherited the literary taste of his uncle Iñigo López de Mendoza y de la Vega, Marquis of Santillana, and was greatly esteemed in his own age; but his reputation was afterwards eclipsed by that of his nephew Jorge Manrique (died 1479), the son of his eldest brother Rodrigo Manrique de Lara, (died 1476), and whose Coplas por la muerte de su padre were continually reproduced.

Manrique's poems were not printed until 1885, when, they were edited by Antonio Paz y Melia. They at once revealed him to be a poet of eminent merit, and it seems certain that his Consejos, addressed to Diego Arias de Avila, inspired the more famous Coplas of his nephew. His didactic verses are modelled upon those of his uncle the Marquis of Santillana, Don Iñigo. He wrote the Representación del nascimiento de Nuestro Senor, a play on the Passion, and two momos, or interludes, played at court, and a large number of poems.
