= Paio Peres Correia =

13th-century Portuguese warrior

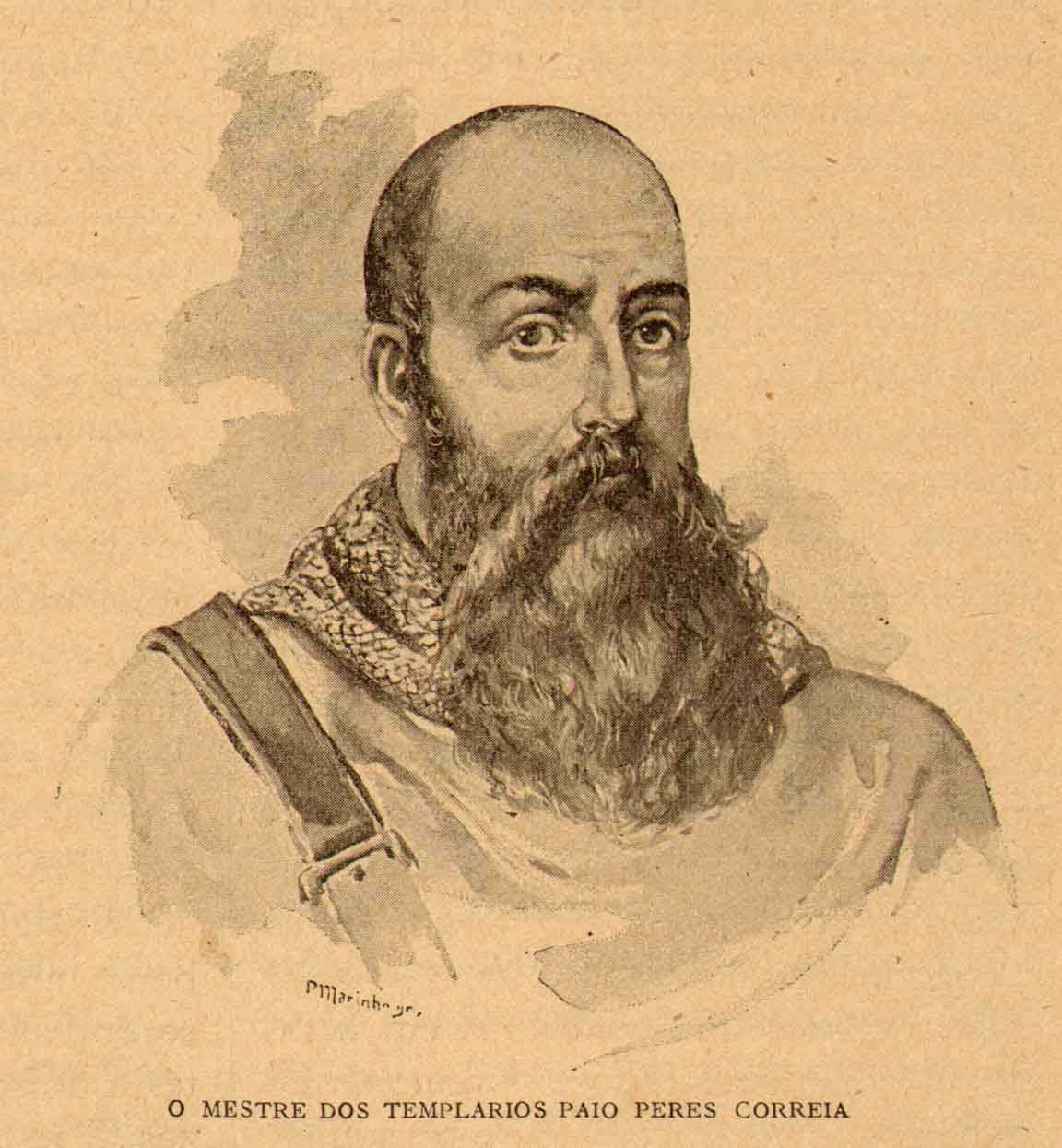
- 19th-century depiction of Paio Peres Correia
- Born: c. 1205; Monte de Fralães, Barcelos, Kingdom of Portugal
- Died: 8 February 1275 (aged 69–70); Uclés, Crown of Castile
- Other name: Pelay Perez Correa

D. Paio Peres Correia (or Pelayo Pérez Correa) (1205 – January 1275), was a Portuguese warrior who played an important role in the thirteenth-century Reconquista.

== Biography ==
He was born c. 1205, in Monte de Fralães, a civil parish in the municipality of Barcelos. While still quite young, he travelled to Uclés, the headquarters of the Order of Santiago in the Kingdom of Castile.

By 1232 he was back in Portugal, as comendador of Alcácer, i.e. the leader of the Portuguese knight-friars of Santiago. Working closely with king Sancho II, the knight-friars conducted several campaigns against the Moors in Alentejo. The initial target was apparently the castle of Aljustrel, albeit this is undocumented; regardless, this had been conquered by March 1235. Advancing from there, he fortified a hill in Padrões, and manned it with 40 knights. This meant he could threaten the defences of Mértola, strategically important for its control over the mouth of the Guadiana. Eventually, Mértola fell to the knight-friars under the command of his cousin Martim Eanes do Vinhal. Paio Peres Correia went southwards to the Algarve, wresting Cacela and Tavira from Moorish control.

In 1242, in Mérida he was made Grand-Master of the military Order of Santiago for life. In that role he assisted the reconquering efforts of Ferdinand III of Castile. Ferdinand’s son, the prince of Castile and the future Alfonso X, was guided by Paio Peres Correia in the conquest of Murcia.

The Crónica da Conquista do Algarve suggests he returned to Algarve during the reign of king Alfonso III. He took part in the capture of Faro in 1249, thus completing the Portuguese conquest of the last of the Algarve still in Moorish hands.

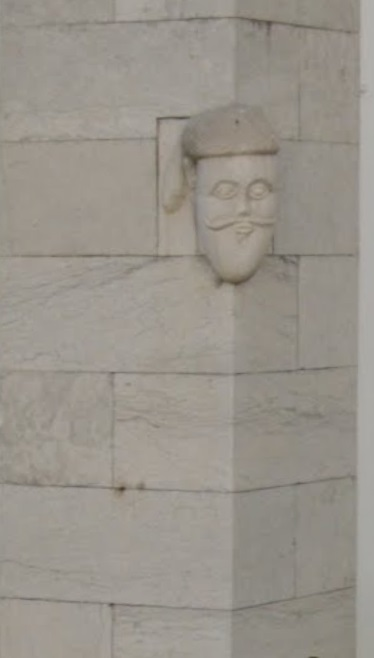
Supposed depiction of D. Paio face in the corner of Tavira City Hall.

== Legacy ==
D. Paio Peres Correia is honoured in the names of places and streets of many Portuguese cities, such as Lisbon, Setúbal, Silves, and Tavira, and also in Spain in the Triana quarter of Seville.

In Portugal, the parish of Aldeia de Paio Pires, in Seixal, and the town of Samora Correia in Benavente claim to be named after him, though this seems to be undocumented.

== See also ==
- Portuguese Conquest of Algarve

Preceded by Rodrigo Íñiguez	Grand Master of the Order of Santiago; 1242–1275	Succeeded by Gonzalo Ruiz Girón
