= Garci Álvarez de Toledo =

Cross of the Order of Santiago.

Garci Álvarez de Toledo y Meneses was a Spanish noble of the House of Oropesa. He was the Grand Master of the Order of Santiago from 1359 to 1366.

== Family origins ==
Garci was from the prestigious House of Oropesa. He was the son of Garci Álvarez de Toledo, the head Alcalde of Toledo, and Mencía Téllez de Meneses y Gómez. He was the brother of Gutierre Álvarez de Toledo, bishop of Palencia and cardinal and chancellor of the Queen Juana Manuel. He was also the brother of Fernán Álvarez de Toledo y Meneses, Marshall of Castile.

== Marriage and descendants ==
Garci married Estefanía de Monroy, but had no children with her. He did however, have an illegitimate son with Catalina de Loaysa, Fernán Álvarez de Toledo y Loaysa. Some historians suggest the possibility that Garci eventually married in secret with Catalina.

== Biography ==
Garci served the king Peter of Castile, being named head Mayordomo of his son Alonso. In 1359 he was named Grand Master of the Order of Santiago after the assassination of Fadrique Alfonso de Castilla.

In 1366, Garci was involved in the war between Henry II of Castile and of Peter of Castile. King Peter went to Sevilla, leaving the defense of Toledo to Garci.

Most of the nobility in Toledo pledged loyalty to Henry II. Garci, unable to defend the city properly, was made to surrender the Grand Mastership to Gonzalo Mexía (who already exercised that title in the court of Henry II), in exchange for the title of Conde of Oropesa and Valdecorneja.

== Death ==
Garci died in 1370 during the Castilian siege of Ciudad Rodrigo which was defended by the Portuguese forces of Ferdinand I of Portugal during the Ferdinand Wars. His estate at Oropesa was inherited by his son Fernán Álvarez de Toledo y Loaysa. His estate and title at Valdecorneja went to his brother Fernán Álvarez de Toledo y Meneses, beginning the bloodline of the Dukes of Alba.

Preceded by Fadrique Alfonso de Castilla	Grand Master of the Order of Santiago; 1359–1366	Succeeded by Gonzalo Mejía de Virués
