= Alonso de Cárdenas =

15th-century Spanish nobleman

Cross of the Order of Santiago.

Alonso de Cárdenas was a Spanish noble who was the 44th and 47th (and last) Grand Master of the Order of Santiago before the title passed to the Catholic Monarchs as the need for a powerful military order outside the direct control of the king ceased to exist with the end of the Reconquista. He is famous for building the castle at Puebla del Maestre in 1483. He was the father of García López de Cárdenas.

== Family ==
Alonso was a member of the House of Cárdenas, a relatively new family that became increasingly powerful in Spain's colonial possessions in the New World. He was the father of García López de Cárdenas who discovered the Gran Cañón del Colorado, today known simply as the "Grand Canyon".

== Biography ==
Alonso de Cárdenas served the Catholic Monarchs during the War of the Castilian Succession. One of the captains under his command was Gonzalo Fernández de Córdoba, also known simply as the "Gran Capitan" for his considerable military exploits throughout Spain's European empire. After the Battle of Albuera, Alonso singled out the Gran Capitan for praise stating that he had always seen the captain leading his troops from the front, a fact he was sure of due to the splendor of his armor.

Throughout his life, he had to engage in continuous power struggles to obtain and maintain power. With the finalization of the Spanish Reconquista, there were fewer and fewer possibilities to contribute militarily to the crown. For this reason, the struggles for power in contemporary Spain left the battlefield and were concentrated more on the political front.

He was Grand Master of the Order of Santiago during two separate terms: the first from 1474 to 1476 and the second from 1477 to 1493, the last year that the order existed in a form semi-independent from the Spanish crown.

Alonso de Cárdenas obtained his first term as Grand Master after his predecessor, Juan Pacheco, the Marquis of Villena, renounced his title in favor of his son, Diego López de Pacheco y Portocarrero. This type of succession for the Grand Mastership of Santiago was incorrect as the title was traditionally obtained by election and not by inheritance. This started a power struggle among the nobles of the order and led to a confrontation between Rodrigo Manrique de Lara and Don Alonso de Cárdenas himself. The result was a period of time in which the order had two different Grand Masters, one for Castile and one for Leon. King Ferdinand II of Aragon stepped into the argument and mediated this division which ended with the death of Pedro Manrique two years later in 1476.

For his contribution in the war against Portugal, Alonso was eventually granted the title of Grand Master in 1474. Throughout his tenure as Grand Master, Alonso held his chapter meetings at Azuaga in the Chapel of San Sebastián which later became known as the Convento de la Merced.

Another instance of political conflict arose between members of the order and the Condado de Feria, located in Zafra. This dispute resulted in a confrontation between Alonso and the "Señor de Feria" after which an agreement was made that the order would demolish its castle at Los Santos de Maimona which had been rebuilt only a few years previously in 1469 by the previous Grand Master, Juan Pacheco.

Disputes also arose with Enrique de Guzmán, the Duke of Medina Sidonia, who in pursuit of the title of Grand Mastership, actively made war against Alonso and other members of the order. In 1475, Alonso de Cárdenas was forced to take refuge in the Castillo de Jerez de los Caballeros to defend himself against the Duke. Shortly thereafter, in 1478, Alonso ambushed and defeated the Duke's forces at Guadalcanal after which the Duke renounced his claim by order of the king.

He finished his career as Grand Master in the Conquest of Granada.

== Death and legacy ==
Alonso de Cárdenas died in 1493 and was buried in a sepulcher at the church of Santiago de Llerena in Llerena.

After his death, the Order of Santiago, by papal mandate, passed into the ownership of the Spanish crown. With the finalization of the Reconquista, there was not any new Spanish territory to conquer on the Iberian Peninsula and nothing left to fight for.

== See also ==
- Order of Santiago
- List of grand masters of the Order of Santiago

Preceded by Juan Pacheco	Grand Master of the Order of Santiago; 1474–1476	Succeeded by Rodrigo Manrique de Lara
Preceded by Ferdinand II of Aragon	Grand Master of the Order of Santiago; 1477–1493	Succeeded by Reyes Católicos
