= Taibilla =

River in Spain

Taibilla is a river of the Province of Albacete, Spain. It runs 47.6 km.

== Taibilla Canal ==
In 1927, the Mancomunidad de los Canales del Taibilla (Taibilla Canal Association) was established with the aim of bringing water from the river to the Cartagena Naval Base and the cities of Cartagena, Murcia and Orihuela. The first phase of the nearly 200 km canal was completed in 1945 and was a milestone in the growth and development of south-eastern Spain.

Since the 1950s, this canal has regularly been diverting much of the flow of the Taibilla, completely drying up a 6 km stretch between the Toma Dam and the village of Vizcable. This reduction has resulted in environmental degradation.
