= List of grand masters of the Order of Santiago =

This page is a list of the grand masters of the Order of Santiago.

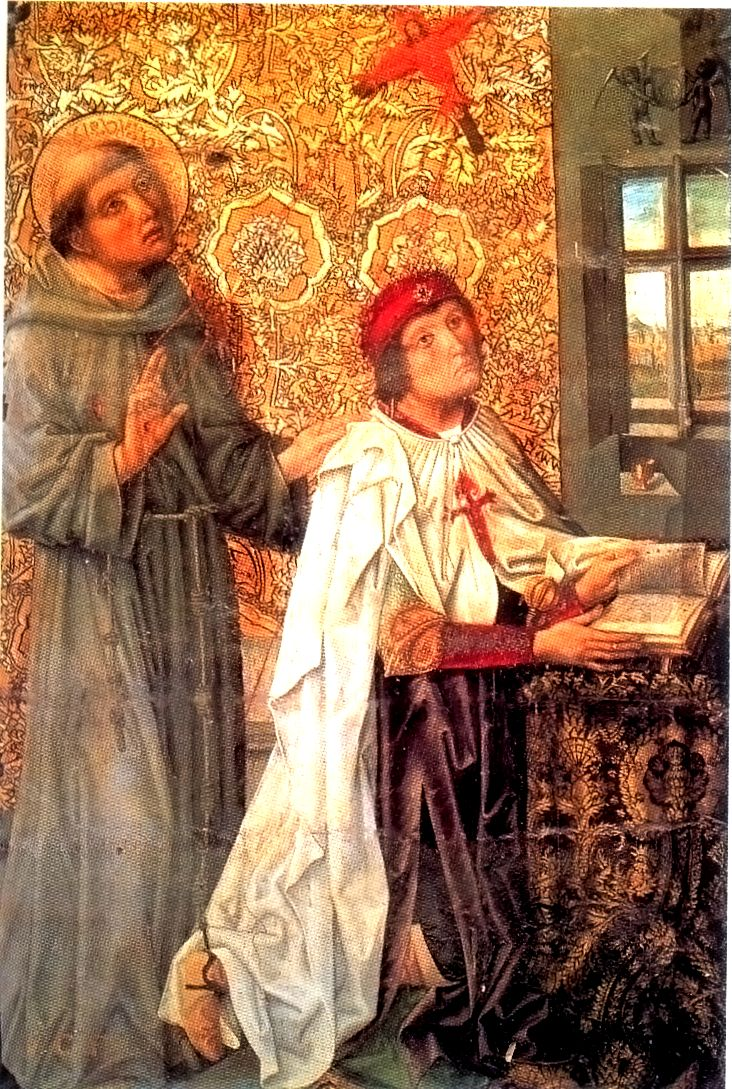
Don Álvaro de Luna with the cloak of the order

== List ==
1. Pedro Fernández de Castro (1170–1184)
2. Fernando Díaz (1184–1186)
3. Sancho Fernández de Lemos (1186–1195). Killed in the battle of Alarcos.
4. Gonzalo Rodríguez (1195–1204) (Note: It is sometimes claimed that a rival master, Gonzalo Ordóñez, was elected by the order in León during the war between León and Castile in 1196–1197, but there is no sound basis for this claim. In the order's bullarium, the fourth grand master appears as Gonsalvus Rodriguez Kodorniz alias Hordoniz.)
5. Suero Rodríguez (1204–1206) (Note: The idea that Suero was replaced by a certain Sancho Rodríguez in 1205 is based on a misreading.)
6. Fernando González de Marañón (1206–1210)
7. Pedro Arias (1210–1212). Died of his wounds, following the Battle of Las Navas de Tolosa.
8. García González de Arauzo (1212–1217)
9. Martín Peláez Barragán (1217–1221)
10. García González de Candamio (1221–1224)
11. Fernán Pérez Chacín (1224–1225)
12. Pedro Alfonso de León (1225–1226). Supposed to be the illegitimate son of Alfonso IX of León.
13. Pedro González Mengo (1226–1237)
14. Rodrigo Íñiguez (o Yáñez) (1237–1242)
15. Paio Peres Correia (1242–1275)
16. Gonzalo Ruiz Girón (1275–1280). Died of wounds received at the disastrous Battle of Moclín.
17. Pedro Núñez (1280–1286)
18. Gonzalo Martel (1286)
19. Pedro Fernández Mata (1286–1293)
20. Juan Osórez (1293–1311)
21. Diego Muñiz (1311–1318)
22. García Fernández (1318–1327)
23. Vasco Rodríguez de Coronado (1327–1338)
24. Vasco López (1338)
25. Alonso Meléndez de Guzmán (1338–1342)
26. Fadrique Alfonso of Castile (1342–1358)
27. Garci Álvarez de Toledo (1359–1366)
28. Gonzalo Mejía de Virués (1366–1371)
29. Fernando Osórez (1371–1383)
30. Pedro Fernández Cabeza de Vaca (1383–1384). Killed in the Siege of Lisbon.
31. Rodrigo González Mejía (1384). Killed in the Siege of Lisbon. (Note: Fernando Alfonso de Valencia was elected as Master on the death of his predecessor, although he died shortly after in the Siege of Lisbon.)
32. Pedro Muñiz de Godoy y Sandoval (1384–1385). Killed in the Battle of Valverde.
33. García Fernández de Villagarcía (1385–1387)
34. Lorenzo I Suárez de Figueroa (Grand Master of Santiago) (1387–1409)
35. Enrique de Aragón (1409–1445)
36. Álvaro de Luna (1445–1453)
37. John II of Castile (1453) Administrator
38. Henry IV of Castile (1453–1462) Administrator
39. Beltrán de la Cueva (1462–1463)
40. Alfonso de Castilla (1463–1467)
41. Juan Pacheco (1467–1474)
42. Alonso de Cárdenas (1474–1476 in Kingdom of León) (first time)
43. Rodrigo Manrique de Lara (1474–1476 in kingdom of Castile)
44. Ferdinand the Catholic (1476–1477) Administrator
45. Alonso de Cárdenas (1477–1493) (second time)
46. Catholic Monarchs of Spain (1493–...) Administrators. Final incorporation into the Crown of Spain under the reign of Charles I of Spain

== Sources ==
- Baquero Moreno, Humberto (1990). Mirandela eo seu foral na Idade Média portuguesa (in Portuguese). Universidade Portucalense. ISSN 0871-2352.
- Menéndez Pidal de Navascués, Faustino (1982). Heráldica medieval española: la Casa Real de León y Castilla (in Spanish). Vol. 1. Instituto Luis de Salazar y Castro. ISBN 8400051505.
