= Pedro Fernández de Castro (Grand Master of the Order of Santiago) =

Spanish nobleman (c. 1115–1184)

Grand Master of the Order of Santiago
- In office 1170–1184
- Monarchs: Ferdinand II of León; Alfonso VIII of Castile
- Succeeded by: Fernando Díaz

Pedro Fernández de Castro, also known as Pedro Fernández de Fuentecalada (c. 1115 – 1184), was the first Grand Master of the Order of Santiago and the founder of the Monastery of Santa Cruz de Valcárcel. He was a Spanish nobleman and a member of the House of Castro.

== Family origins ==
Pedro was the son of Fernando García de Hita, founder of the powerful Castro family, by his wife Estefanía Ermengol, daughter of Ermengol V, Count of Urgell. (Note: Contemporary records call Fernando García a cousin of Queen Urraca of León and Castile, which with his patronymic has led historians to view him as illegitimate son of King García II of Galicia, and this continues to be followed by some modern scholars (e.g. Torres Sevilla-Quiñones de León). Salazar y Acha suggests an alternative filiation, that Fernando was son of count García Ordóñez by Urraca Garcés the daughter of the Navarese King García Sánchez III of Navarre, who was Urraca's great-uncle.)

== Biography ==
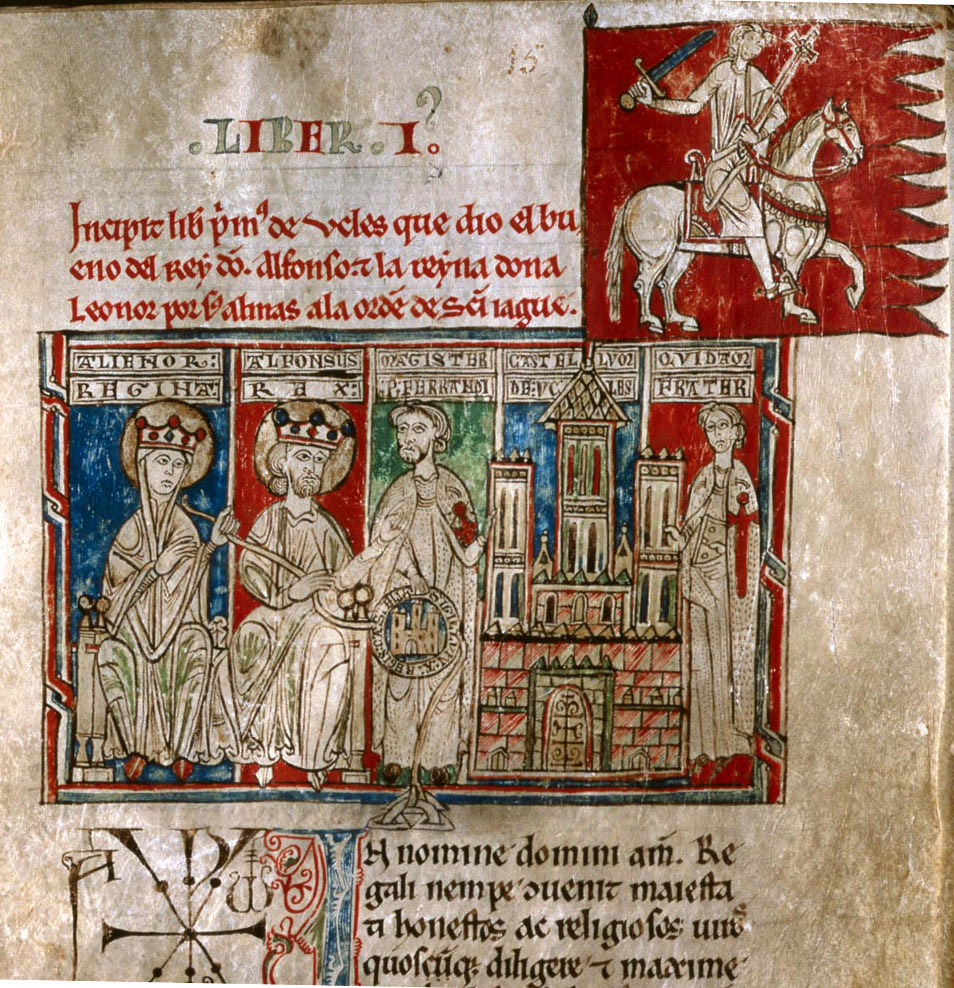
King Alfonso VIII of Castile and Queen Eleonor Plantagenet delivering the city and the village of Uclés to the master of the Order of Santiago Pedro Fernandez de Castro v. Tumbo menor de Castilla, f. 1. (ancient codex from 13th century)

Pedro fought in the army of Alfonso VII of León and Castile in the conquest of Aurelia and Alharilla in the present day area of Santa Cruz de la Zarza. Later in 1146, he participated in further military campaigns, assisting in the occupation of Baeza and the landings in Almería. These actions were an important part of the overall military campaign because they devastated the Moorish navy and largely removed them from the war at large.

Later, while crusading in the Holy Land, he decided to create a new military order dedicated to protecting the sepulcher of James the Apostle and to protecting the Way of St. James.

On 4 August 1165, Pedro, together with his wife, his sister Urraca, and his children, donated a house to abbot Miguel in Santa Cruz de Valcárcel for the purpose of founding a monastery dedicated to the principles of the order. The donation was confirmed by his wife's brothers, Nuño and Álvaro Pérez de Lara, in addition to Gómez González de Manzanedo, the husband of Pedro's sister-in-law, Milia Pérez de Lara, as well as his brothers and other members of the Castro family. Later that year, at the age of 50, Pedro Fernández officially founded the Order of Santiago in the city of Cáceres. The spirit of the order was born in the times of the Almohad invasion and is influenced by the Knights Templar, to which Pedro had become acquainted with in the Holy Land. His wife and daughter would later become nuns at the Monastery of Santa Cruz de Valcárcel.

Francisco de Rades y Andrada, in his chronicles of military orders, records Pedro's death in 1184, being buried in the main chapel of the Convent of San Marcos, León.

== Marriage and descendants ==
Pedro Fernández married María Pérez de Lara, daughter of count Pedro González de Lara, with whom he had the following children: (Note: His marriage and descendants are amply documented, especially in the documents kept at the Monastery of Santa Cruz de Valcárcel, the Monastery of Santa María la Real in Aguilar de Campoo, and the Monastery of San Román de Entrepeñas) (Note: In 1206, María Pérez and her children, Fernando Pérez "la Podestá", Gómez Pérez, Eylo, María de Aragón, and Milia, on one part, and the prior of the Monastery of San Román de Entrepeñas, on the other, exchange a mill in Castellos for another property.)

- Fernando Pérez de Castro: known as "Potestad". Married Teresa Bermúdez, with children.
- Gómez Pérez de Castro, tenente of the territory of Santullán.
- Elo Pérez de Castro, first abbess at the Monastery of Santa Cruz de Valcárcel. (Note: On 17 February 1219, in the documentation from the Monastery of Santa Cruz de Valcarcel, King Fernando III grants his protection to the monastery and confirms the possession of the property donated to Elo, its abbess. ...quod vos donna Elo nunc de novo construiis sub regula Sanctii Benedicti, vobisque eiusdem monasterii instante abbatisse.)
- María Pérez de Castro, also known as María de Aragón.
- Milia Pérez de Castro

Grand Master of the Order of Santiago; 1170 – 1184	Succeeded by Fernando Díaz

== Biography ==
- Canal Sánchez-Pagín, José María (1984). "Don Pedro Fernández, primer maestre de la Orden Militar de Santiago: Su familia, su vida". Anuario de Estudios Medievales. 14. Madrid: Consejo Superior de Investigaciones Científicas, CSIC: Institución Milá y Fontanals. Departamento de Estudios Medievales: 33–72. ISSN 0066-5061.
- Salazar y Acha, Jaime de (1991). "El linaje castellano de Castro en el siglo XII: Consideraciones e hipótesis sobre su origen". Anales de la Real Academia Matritense de Heráldica (1): 33–68. ISSN 1133-1240.
- Torres Sevilla-Quiñones de León, Margarita (1999). Linajes nobiliarios en León y Castilla siglos IX-XIII. Consejería de Educación y Cultura de Castilla y León. ISBN 84-7846-781-5.
- Ubieto Arteta, Antonio (1976). Cartulario de San Millán de la Cogolla (759-1076). Anubar Ediciones. ISBN 84-7013-082-X.
