= Treaty of the Bulls of Guisando =

1468 treaty between Henry IV of Castile and Isabella of Castile

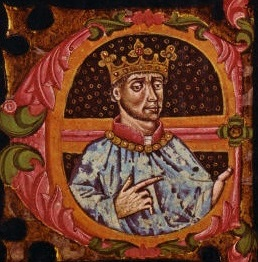
Henry IV of Castile

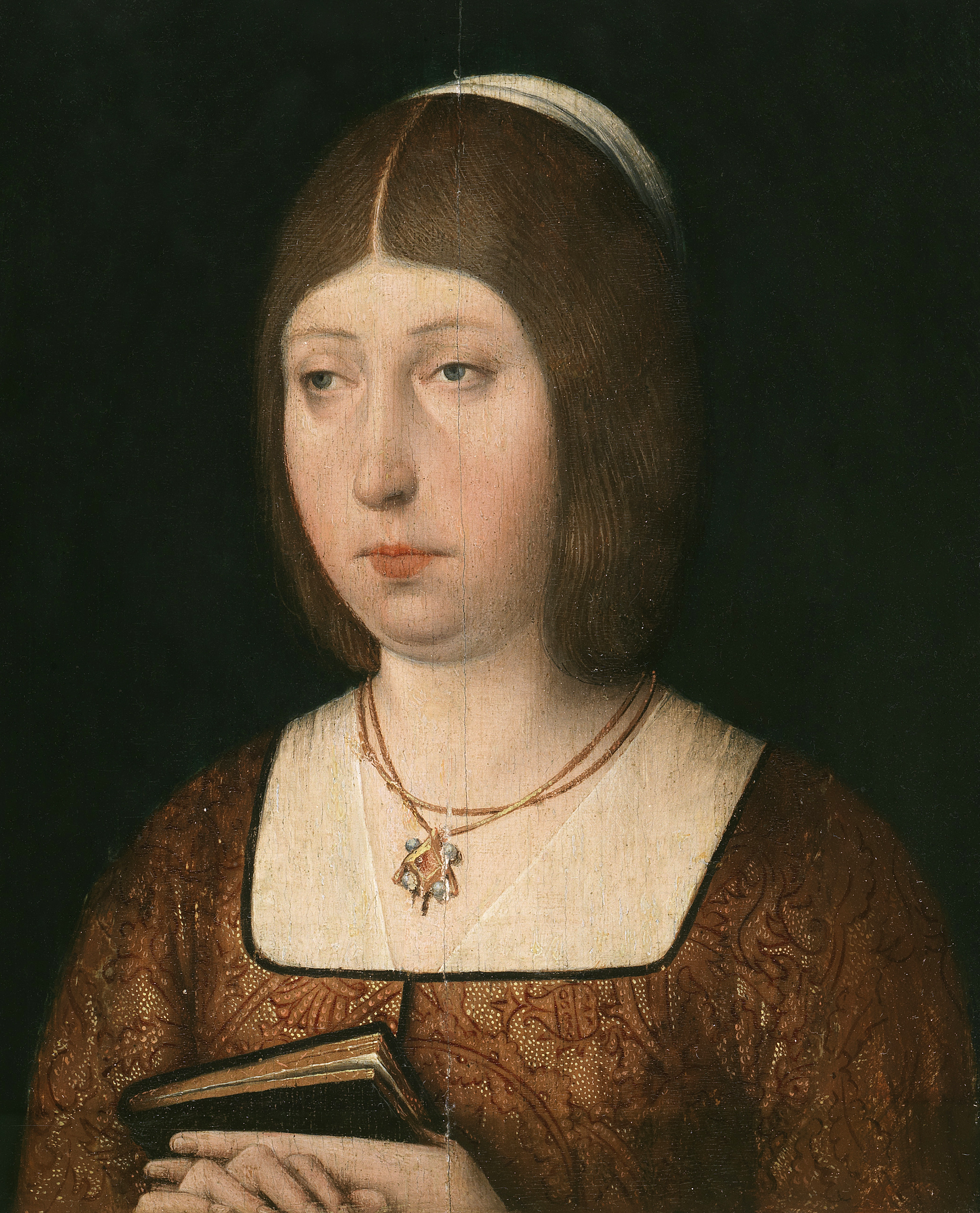
Isabella I of Castile

The Treaty of the Bulls of Guisando (Spanish: Tratado de los Toros de Guisando) is the name of a treaty agreed on top of the hill of Guisando near the Bulls of Guisando (located in Ávila, Spain) on 19 September 1468, between Henry IV of Castile and his half-sister Isabella of Castile. The treaty granted Isabella the title of Princess of Asturias and so she became heiress presumptive to the Crown of Castile.

A civil war began in Castile in 1464 when a group of noblemen rebelled in an attempt to force the abdication of Henry IV. By 1465 they had symbolically dethroned the King and replace him with his half-brother Alfonso. With the death of Alfonso, in 1468, Isabella the half-sister of Henry IV, became the new candidate of the rebels. Rather than continuing the civil war, Isabella preferred to negotiate with Henry IV sending Giacopo Antonio Venier as mediator.

After several meetings in Castronuevo a preliminary agreement was reached that would put an end to the civil war. The agreement was formalized in the Treaty of the Bulls of Guisando on 18 September 1468. With the treaty, the allegiance of the whole Kingdom of Castile was to return to the King and Isabella was to become his heiress presumptive, receive the title of Princess of Asturias as well as a large endowment. Isabella was to marry only with the consent of the King. Finally, Joanna, the King's daughter, was removed from the line of succession to the throne through the annulment of Henry's marriage to his wife.

Later, the unapproved wedding of Isabella with Ferdinand of Aragon caused Henry IV to shun the treaty. As a consequence the King recognized once more the rights of his daughter Joanna in a ceremony that took place in Val de Lozoya on 25 November 1470. This was one of the events that eventually led to the War of the Castilian Succession a few years later.
