= Santa María del Campo Rus =

Santa María del Campo Rus, Spain
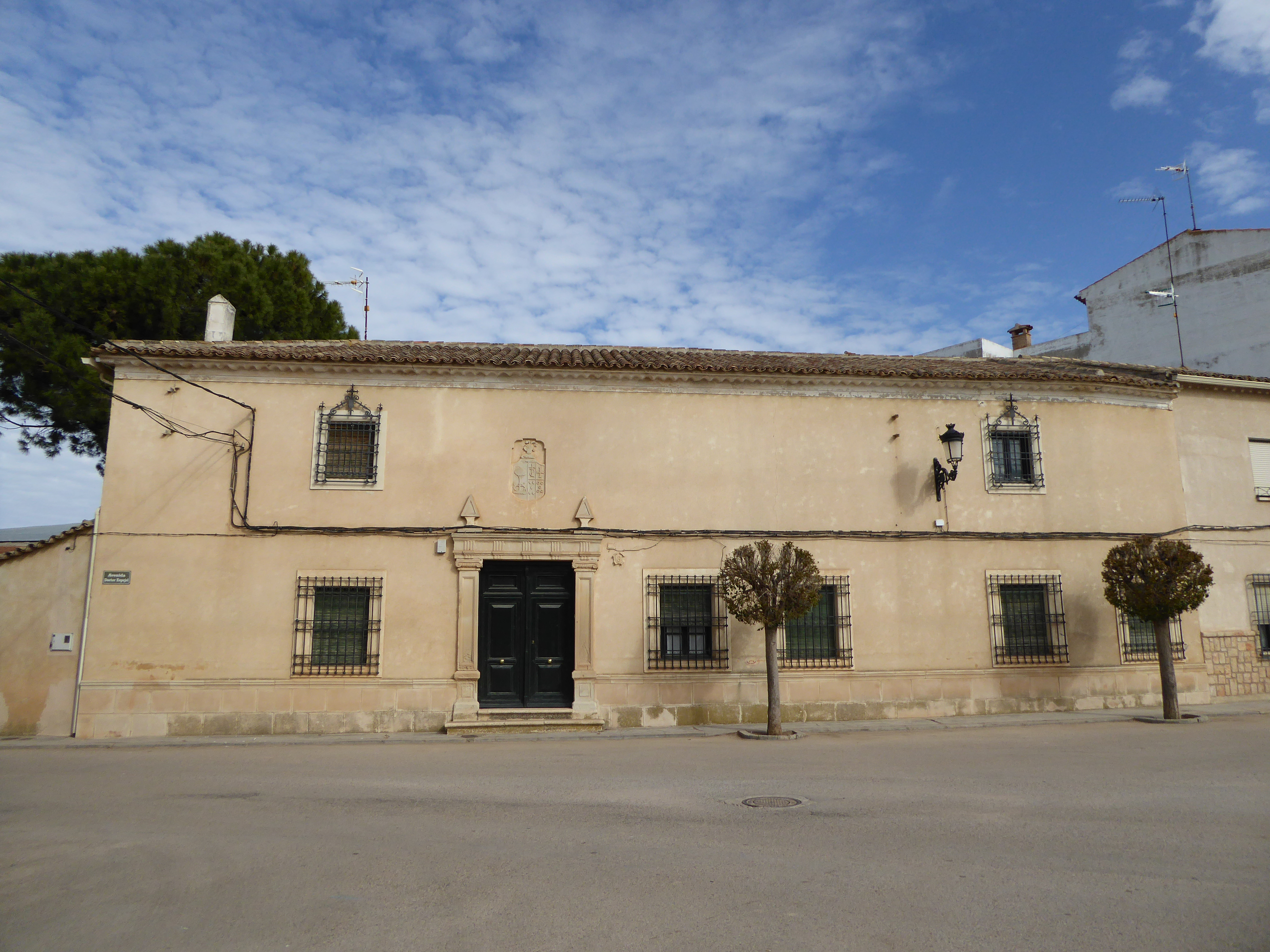

- Coat of arms

- Location within Spain Location within Castilla-La Mancha
- Coordinates: 39°34′N 2°26′W
- Country: Spain
- Autonomous community: Castile-La Mancha
- Province: Cuenca
- Municipality: Santa María del Campo Rus

Area
  - Total: 93 km^{2} (36 sq mi)

Population (2025-01-01)
  - Total: 527
  - Density: 5.7/km^{2} (15/sq mi)
- Time zone: UTC+1 (CET)
  - Summer (DST): UTC+2 (CEST)

Santa María del Campo Rus is a municipality located in the province of Cuenca, Castile-La Mancha, Spain. According to the 2004 census (INE), the municipality has a population of 762 inhabitants.
