= Toma Dam =

Dam in Hokkaido Prefecture, Japan

- Location within Japan
- Location: Hokkaido Prefecture, Japan
- Coordinates: 43°52′20″N 142°34′56″E
- Opening date: 1967

Dam and spillways
- Height: 21.3 m (70 ft)
- Length: 218 m (715 ft)

Reservoir
- Total capacity: 3,039,000 m^{3} (107,300,000 cu ft)
- Catchment area: 19.8 km^{2} (7.6 sq mi)
- Surface area: 47 hectares (120 acres)

Toma Dam (Japanese: 当麻ダム) is an earthfill dam located in Hokkaido Prefecture in Japan. The dam is used for irrigation. The catchment area of the dam is 19.8 km^{2}. The dam impounds about 47 ha of land when full and can store 3039 thousand cubic meters of water. The construction of the dam was completed in 1967.
