= Second Battle of Olmedo =

Part of the War of the Castilian Succession (1467)

The Second Battle of Olmedo was fought on 20 August 1467 near Olmedo in Castile (now in the province of Valladolid, Spain) as part of the War of the Castilian Succession between Henry IV of Castile and his half-brother Alfonso, Prince of Asturias.

Alfonso's troops advanced eastwards along the valley of the Duero towards central Castile, while the troops loyal to Henry moved north from Cuéllar towards Medina del Campo to try to cut them off: the two armies met near Olmedo.

Henry's troops comprised:

- at the vanguard, Pedro de Velasco, his brothers Luis and Sancho and his cousin Juan;
- in the second line, the Marquess of Santillana with his brothers Hurtado and Pedro (who was bishop of Calahorra), along with the royal guard under the command of Juan Fernández Galindo;
- the rearguard under the command of Beltrán de la Cueva.

A notable absence among Henry's troops was Juan Pacheco, who was occupied with securing the leadership of the Order of Santiago.

With Prince Alfonso fought the troops of the Archbishop of Toledo, the Archbishop of Seville, of the Counts of Luna, Plasencia and Ribadeo, as well as of the Order of Calatrava. Fernando de Fonseca, fighting for Alfonso, was killed in this battle by Beltrán de la Cueva.

The battle was considered a stand-off and thus was considered a victory for Henry. However, after the battle, Henry lost the support of Pedro Arias de Ávila and of the Count of Alba, the latter won over by favours from the Marquess of Villena and from the Archbishop of Toledo.

== See also ==
- First Battle of Olmedo
