= Castronuevo =

Coordinates: 41°43′N 5°32′W

Castronuevo, Spain
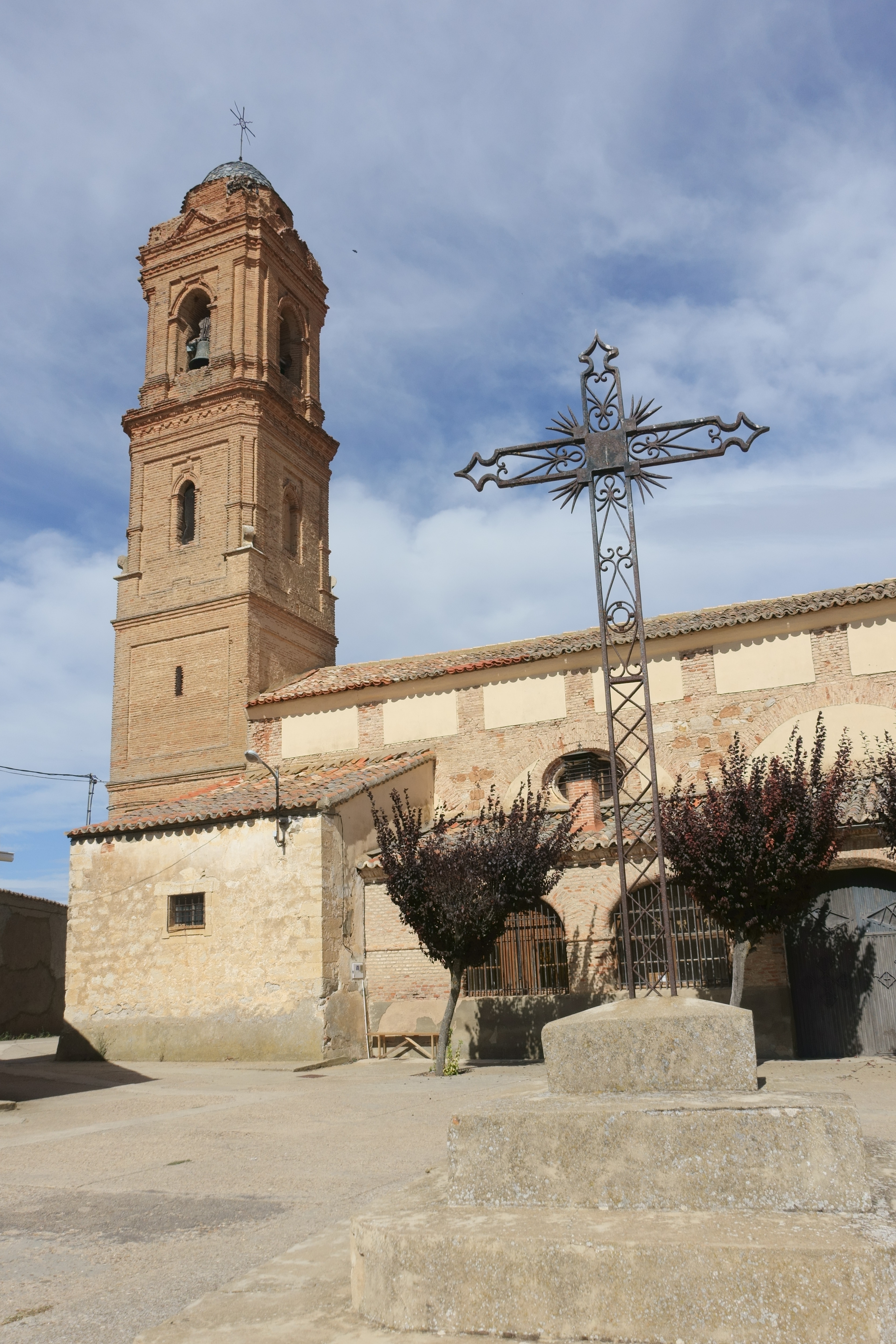

- Flag Coat of arms
- Interactive map of Castronuevo, Spain
- Country: Spain
- Autonomous community: Castile and León
- Province: Zamora
- Municipality: Castronuevo

Area
  - Total: 47 km^{2} (18 sq mi)

Population (2025-01-01)
  - Total: 216
  - Density: 4.6/km^{2} (12/sq mi)
- Time zone: UTC+1 (CET)
  - Summer (DST): UTC+2 (CEST)

Castronuevo is a municipality in the province of Zamora, Castile and León, Spain. According to the 2009 census (INE), the municipality has a population of 312 inhabitants.
