= Alfonso, Prince of Asturias (1453–1468) =

Alfonso
- Prince of Asturias
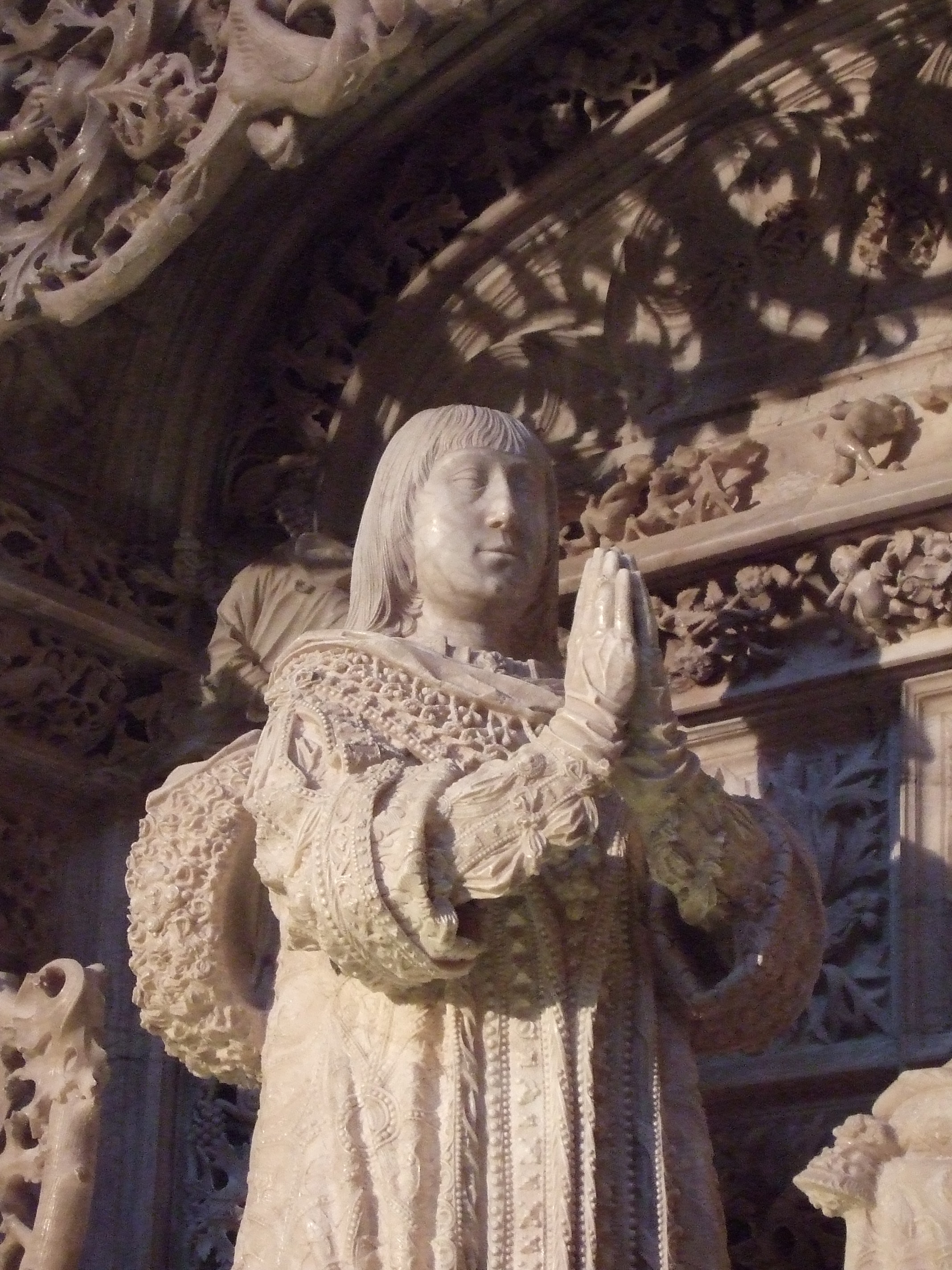
- Sculpture of Alfonso from his tomb in Burgos
- Born: 17 November 1453; Tordesillas, Valladolid, Castile
- Died: 5 July 1468 (aged 14); Cardeñosa, Ávila, Castile
- Burial: Miraflores Charterhouse
- House: Trastámara
- Father: John II of Castile
- Mother: Isabella of Portugal

Alfonso, Prince of Asturias (17 November 1453 – 5 July 1468), called Alfonso the Innocent, was the figurehead of rebelling Castilian magnates against his half-brother Henry IV, who had recognized him as heir presumptive.

== Childhood ==
Alfonso was the only surviving son of John II by his second wife, Isabella of Portugal. Alfonso's older sister, the future Isabella I of Castile, was also the product of this second marriage.

After the death of his father, John II, Alfonso, his mother and sister were virtually exiled, his mother to Arevalo and the children to Segovia. When Alfonso was around seven years of age the two children were moved to Henry's court at Madrid and were placed in Queen Joan's household. During this period it is rumored that Queen Joan tried to poison Alfonso on at least one occasion, to secure the succession for her only daughter.

== Heir to the Throne ==
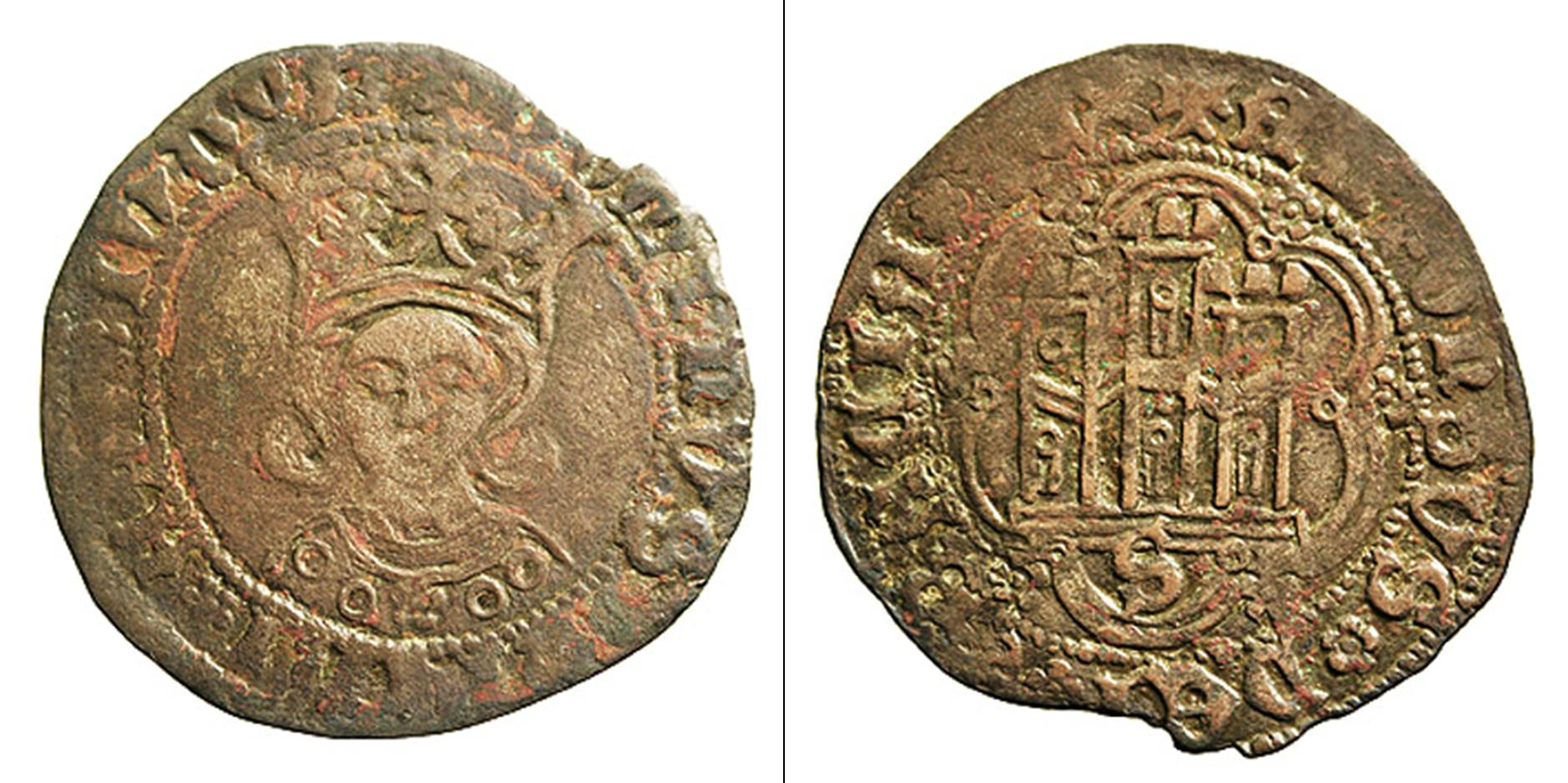
Coin minted by Alfonso's supporters in Seville.

In early 1460s, Castilian nobles became dissatisfied with the rule of King Henry IV and believed that Queen Joan's child (Joanna, Princess of Asturias) had not been sired by Henry. Propaganda and rumour, encouraged by the league of rebellious nobles, argued that her father was Beltrán de la Cueva, a royal favorite of low background whom Henry had elevated to enormous power and who, as suggested by Alfonso de Palencia and others, may have been Joan's lover. This resulted in the name "Juana la Beltraneja", which has stuck with the girl throughout history. If Joanna was illegitimate, the next in line was Alfonso. If she was legitimate, then Alfonso and, ultimately, his famous sister Isabella were both usurpers. Considering Isabella's impact on world history, this question has fascinated historians for centuries.

== "Alfonso XII" ==
The league of nobles controlling Alfonso forced Henry with the 1464 Representation of Burgos to repudiate Joanna and recognize Alfonso as his official heir. Alfonso then became Prince of Asturias, a title previously held by Joanna. Henry agreed to the compromise with the stipulation that Alfonso someday marry Joanna, to ensure that they both would one day receive the crown.

Not long after this, Henry reneged on his promise and began to support his daughter's claim once more. On 5 June 1465, the nobles in league against him conducted a ceremonial deposition-in-effigy of Henry outside the city of Avila and crowned Alfonso as a rival king. This event is known as the Farce of Ávila. Shortly thereafter, Alfonso began handing out land and titles as if he were already uncontested ruler. A civil war began. The most notable clash was at the Second Battle of Olmedo in 1467, which concluded as a draw.

== Death and burial ==
However, in 1468 at the age of only 14, Alfonso suddenly died. The cause of death is not known, but it likely to have been an illness such as consumption or plague (although it is rumored that he had been deliberately poisoned by his enemies).

He was interred near his father, (where they were later joined by Isabella of Portugal) at the Miraflores Charterhouse, in tombs commissioned by Isabella. In 2006, during the restoration of the charterhouse, the General Directorate of Cultural Heritage and Assets of the Junta de Castilla y León decided to carry out an anthropological study on the tombs. His remains, deposited in a walnut coffin were found to be poorly preserved. His height was estimated to have been 165 centimeters.

In 2013 a further study based on these results was published by the University of Leon, theorising that Alfonso was poisoned, as his symptoms did not align with those of Bubonic plague, and his remains show no trace of the bacteria Yersinia pestis.

His will left his crown to his sister, Isabella, who was asked to take her brother's place as the champion of the rebels. Shortly thereafter, she declined, and after a negotiation at Toros de Guisando, in which she and her allies received most of what they desired, Henry was convinced to exclude Joanna la Beltraneja from the succession, and to recognize Isabella as his official heir. Though Henry continued to resist this decision when possible, his actions were ineffective, and he remained at peace with Isabella for the rest of his reign. Isabella became Castile's next monarch when he died in 1474.

== Sources ==
- Silleras-Fernandez, Nuria (2024). The Politics of Emotion: Love, Grief, and Madness in Medieval and Early Modern Iberia. Cornell University Press. ISBN 9781501773884.

Alfonso, Prince of Asturias House of Trastámara Born: 17 November 1453 Died: 5 July 1468
Honorary titles
Preceded by John II of Castile as Administrator	Grand Master of the Order of Santiago; 1453–1462; With: Henry IV as Administrator	Succeeded by Beltrán de la Cueva
Preceded by Beltrán de la Cueva	Grand Master of the Order of Santiago; 1463–1467	Succeeded by Juan Pacheco
Spanish royalty
Preceded by Joanna la Beltraneja	Prince of Asturias; 1464–1468	Succeeded by Isabella
Titles in pretence
Preceded by Henry IV	King of Castile and León; 1464–1468	Succeeded by Henry IV
