= Amusco =

Coordinates: 42°10′N 4°28′W

- municipality
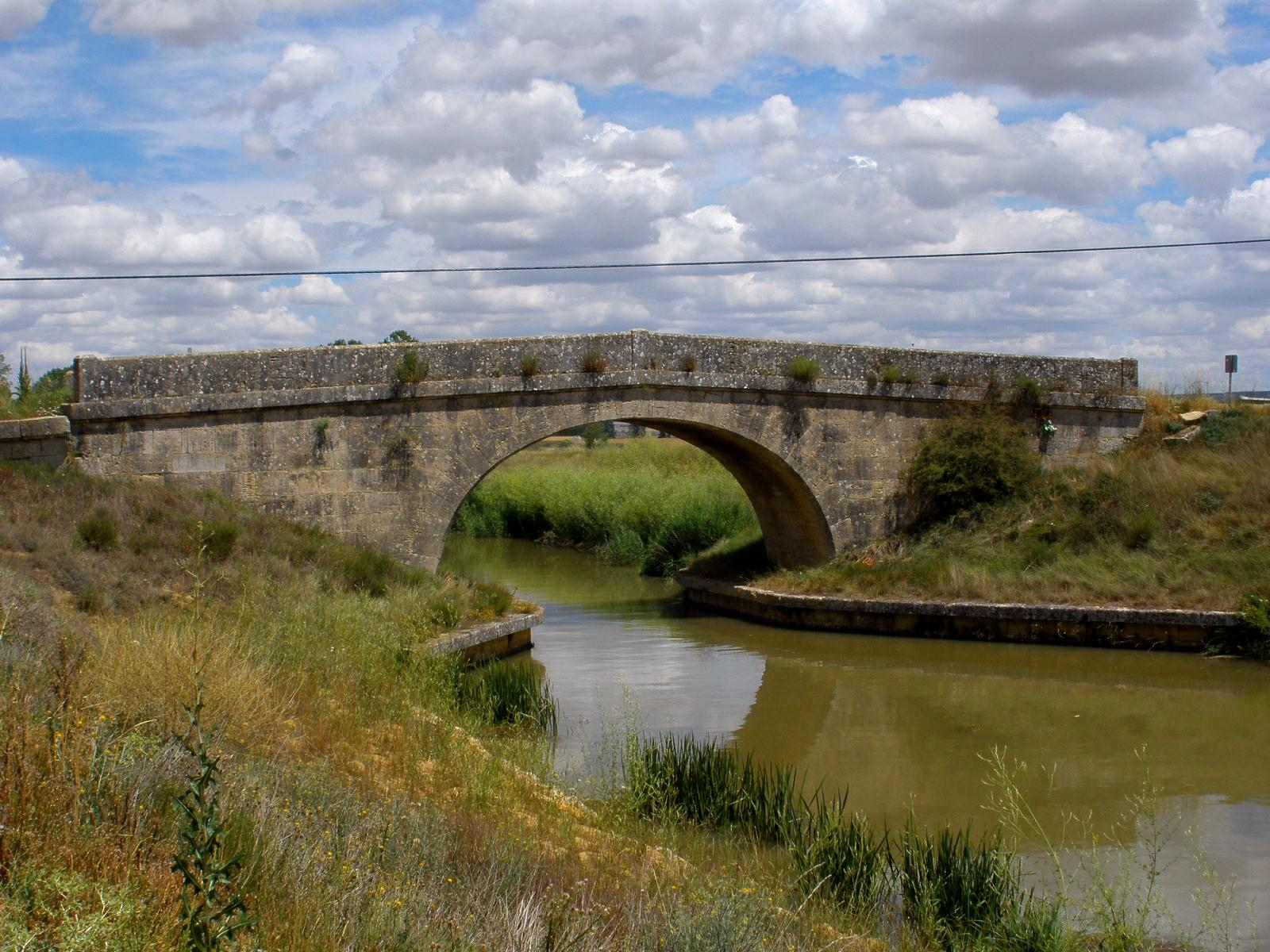

- Coat of arms
- Interactive map of Amusco
- Country: Spain
- Autonomous community: Castile and León
- Province: Palencia
- Municipality: Amusco

Area
  - Total: 78 km^{2} (30 sq mi)

Population (2004)
  - Total: 507
  - Density: 6.5/km^{2} (17/sq mi)
- Time zone: UTC+1 (CET)
  - Summer (DST): UTC+2 (CEST)
- Website: Official website

Amusco is a municipality located in the province of Palencia, Castile and León, Spain.

According to the 2004 census (INE), the municipality had a population of 507 inhabitants.
