= Diego López de Pacheco, 2nd Duke of Escalona =

Spanish noble

Arms of Diego López Pacheco

Diego López de Pacheco (Villena, 1456 – Escalona, November 26, 1529) was a Spanish noble, 2nd Duke of Escalona and 2nd Marquis of Villena and Mayordomo mayor of the King between 1472 and 1480.

== Biography ==
Diego López Pacheco was son of Juan Pacheco, one of the most influential politicians of his time, and María Portocarrero. In 1468, he received from his father the title of 2nd Marquis of Villena. At the age of 12, Diego was married to Juana de Luna, also 12 and granddaughter of Álvaro de Luna, as part of a plan by his family to get a hold of the inheritance of Álvaro de Luna. Juana Pimentel, grandmother of Juana de Luna, had tried to prevent the marriage, but had failed because of the intervention of King Henry IV of Castile.

In the War of the Castilian Succession, Diego and his father supported Juana la Beltráneja, who lost the battle for the throne. Diego, who had become 2nd Duke of Escalona after the death of his father in October 1474, submitted to Isabella I of Castile after, in 1476, he failed to be elected as Grand Master of the Order of Santiago. He accepted a pardon, but a year later was forced to surrender after his town of Escalona, which was fortified, was captured.

His wife Juana de Luna died in 1480. Diego remarried in 1484 with Juana Enríquez y Velasco, sister of Fadrique Enríquez, Admiral of Castile. Diego López Pacheco fought as general against the Moors, and was present in the final Siege of Granada in 1492, which ended the Moorish presence in Spain. In 1504, after the death of Isabel, Pacheco supported her eldest surviving daughter, Queen Juana, and her king consort Felipe, over King Ferdinand of Aragon's faction. In 1519, he was made a Knight in the Order of the Golden Fleece.

== Humanist ==
Diego was an admirer of Desiderius Erasmus. In his castle, he entertained alumbrados like Isabel de la Cruz and Pedro Ruíz de Alcaraz, both conversos. Diego was also an important patron of culture and the arts. Francisco de Osuna dedicated in 1527 his book El tercer abecedario espiritual (The Third Spiritual Alphabet) to him, as did Juan de Valdés 2 years later with his book Diálogo de la doctrina cristiana.

Juana Enríquez and Diego López Pacheco are buried in the El Parral monastery in Segovia.

== Children ==
With Juana de Luna:

- Juan Pacheco de Luna (died 1490)

With Juana Enríquez:

- Diego López Pacheco (1506–1556), third Duke of Escalona
- Isabel Pacheco
- Magdalena Pacheco
