= First Battle of Olmedo =

1445 battle between the kingdom of Castile and the allied kingdoms of Navarre and Aragon

The First Battle of Olmedo, between Castilian forces and those of Navarre and Aragon, took place on 19 May 1445 outside Olmedo in Castile (now in the province of Valladolid, Spain).

The war was in part prompted by the decrees of John II of Castile and his aide Álvaro de Luna that rents, that is taxes, from the town of Medina del Campo would be paid to his administration, rather than that of John II of Aragon, also of Navarre. The latter king invaded Castile, aided by his brother Alfonso V of Aragón. The Castilian king departed from Medina del Campo, and met the invasion at Olmedo, where he was successful. The infante (prince) Henry of Aragon, the younger brother of Alfonso and John, died of his wounds a few days later in Calatayud.

== See also ==
- Second Battle of Olmedo
- Castilian Civil War of 1437–1445

== Sources ==
- Marino, Nancy F. (2006). Don Juan Pacheco: wealth and power in late medieval Spain. Tempe, Ariz: Arizona Center for Medieval and Renaissance Studies. ISBN 0-86698-356-2.
- Martin, José Luis (2003). Enrique IV. Hondarribia: Nerea. ISBN 84-89569-82-7.
- Valdeón Baruque, Julio (2001). Los Trastámaras. Madrid: Temas de Hoy. ISBN 84-8460-129-3.
