= Order of Santiago =

Spanish religious and military order founded in the 12th century

Order of Santiago Orden de Santiago
- The Cross of Saint James as used by the Order
- Type: Religious Order of Honour and Military Order
- Established: 1170
- Country: Spain
- Royal house: House of Bourbon - Spain
- Religious affiliation: Roman Catholic
- Sovereign: King Felipe VI

Precedence
- Equivalent: Order of Calatrava; Order of Alcántara; Order of Montesa
- Related: Order of Saint James of the Sword

The Order of Santiago (/ˌsɒntiˈɑːɡoʊ/; Spanish: Orden de Santiago [sanˈtjaɣo]) is a religious and military order founded in the 12th century. It owes its name to the patron saint of Spain, Santiago (St. James the Greater). Its initial objective was to protect the pilgrims on the Way of St. James, to defend Christendom and to remove the Muslim Moors from the Iberian Peninsula with the Reconquista. Entrance was not restricted to nobility of Spain exclusively, and some members have been Catholic Europeans from other parts of Europe. The Order's insignia is particularly recognisable and abundant in Western art.

With the culmination of the Reconquista and the death of the Grand Master Alonso de Cárdenas, the Catholic Monarchs incorporated the Order into the Spanish Crown, and the Pope Adrian VI forever united the office of Grand Master of Santiago to the Crown in 1523.

The First Republic suppressed the Order in 1873, but it was re-established in the Restoration as a nobiliary institute of honorable character. The Order was again suppressed after the proclamation of the Second Republic in 1931. With the fall of the Republic and the re-establishment of the Monarchy, the Order of Santiago was definitely restored with the kingship of Juan Carlos I with the character of a nobiliary, honorable, and religious order; and remains as such.

The Order of Santiago is one of the four Spanish military orders, together with those of Calatrava, Alcántara, and Montesa.

== Insignia ==
The Order's insignia is said to originate from the Battle of Clavijo, and is a red cross resembling a sword, with the shape of a fleur-de-lis on the hilt and the arms. The knights wore the cross stamped on the royal standard and white cape. The cross of the royal standard had a Mediterranean scallop in the center and another one at the end of each arm.

The three fleurs-de-lis represent the "honor without stain", which is in reference to the moral features of the Apostle's character.

The sword represents the chivalrous character of the apostle St. James and his martyr ways, since he was decapitated with a sword. It can also symbolize taking the sword in the name of Christ, in a certain sense.

It is said that its shape originated in the era of the Crusades, when the knights took with them small crosses with sharpened bottoms to stick them in the ground and carry out their daily devotions.

== History ==
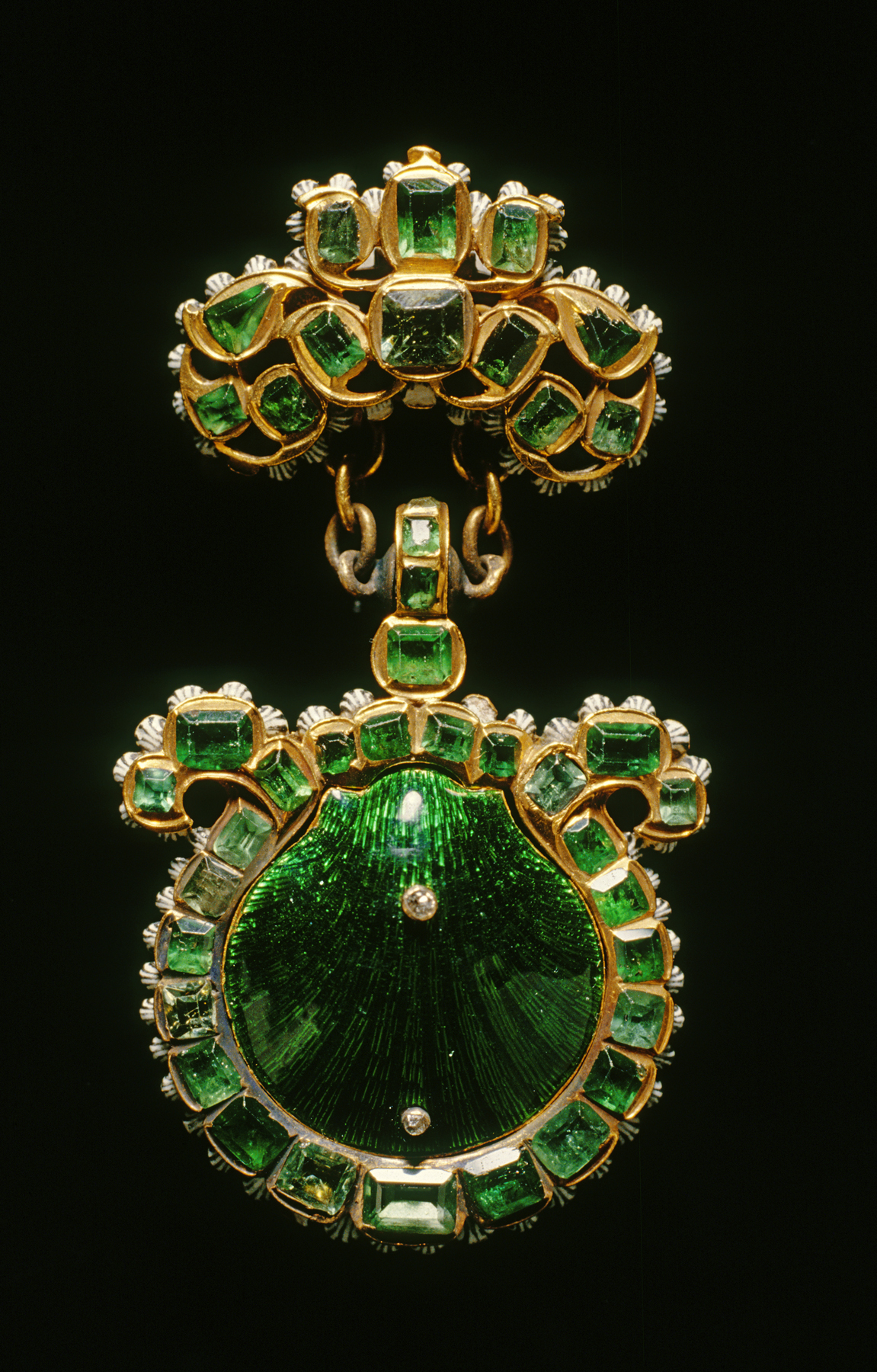
Badge of order at the Walters Museum, 17th century

=== Middle Ages ===
Santiago de Compostela, in Galicia, the centre of devotion to this Apostle, is neither the cradle nor the principal seat of the order. Two cities contend for the honour of having given it birth, León in the kingdom of that name, and Uclés in Castile. At that time (1157–1230) the royal dynasty was divided into two branches, the rivalry of which tended to obscure the beginnings of the order. The Knights of Santiago had possessions in each of the kingdoms, but Ferdinand II of León and Alfonso VIII of Castile, in bestowing them, set the condition that the seat of the order should be in their respective states. Hence arose long disputes which only ended in 1230 when Ferdinand III, the Saint, united both crowns. Thereafter, Uclés, in Cuenca Province, was regarded as the headquarters of the order; there the grand master habitually resided, aspirants passed their year of probation, and the rich archives of the order were preserved until united in 1869 with the "Archivo Histórico Nacional" of Madrid. The order received its first rule in 1171 from Cardinal Jacinto (later Pope Celestine III), then legate in Iberia of Pope Alexander III. This first Grand Master was Pedro Fernández de Castro, also known as Pedro Fernández de Fuentecalada, a soldier of King Ferdinand II and a former crusader.

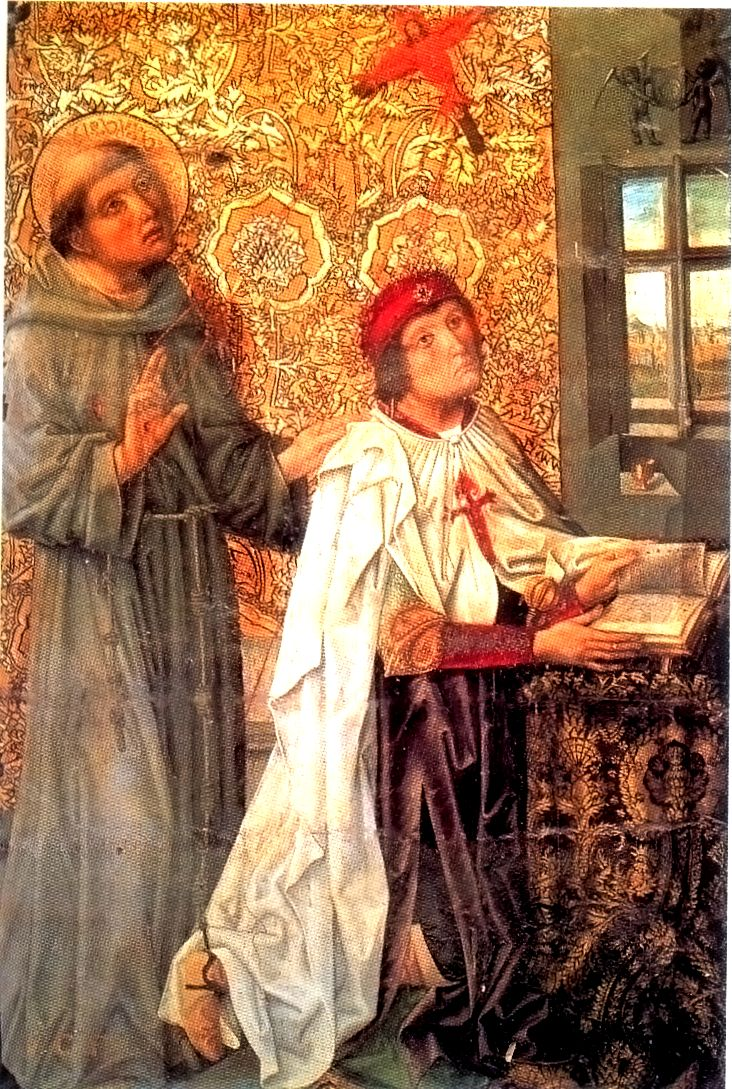
Álvaro de Luna (between 1388 and 1390; June 2, 1453), Constable of Castile, Grand Master of the military order of Santiago, and favorite of King John II of Castile

Unlike the contemporary orders of Calatrava and Alcántara, which followed the severe rule of the Benedictines of Cîteaux, Santiago adopted the milder rule of the Canons of St. Augustine. At León, they offered their services to the Canons Regular of Saint Eligius in that town for the protection of pilgrims to the shrine of St. James and the hospices on the roads leading to Compostela. This explains the mixed character of their order—hospitaller and military—like that of St. John of Jerusalem. They were recognized as religious by Pope Alexander III, whose Bull of 5 July 1175, was subsequently confirmed by more than twenty of his successors. These pontifical acts, collected in the Bullarium of the order, secured them all the privileges and exemptions of other monastic orders. The order comprised several affiliated classes: canons, charged with the administration of the sacraments; canonesses, occupied with the service of pilgrims; religious knights living in community, and married knights. The right to marry, which other military orders only obtained at the end of the Middle Ages, was accorded them from the beginning under certain conditions, such as the authorization of the king, the obligation of observing continence during Advent, Lent, and on certain festivals of the year, which they spent at their monasteries in retreat.

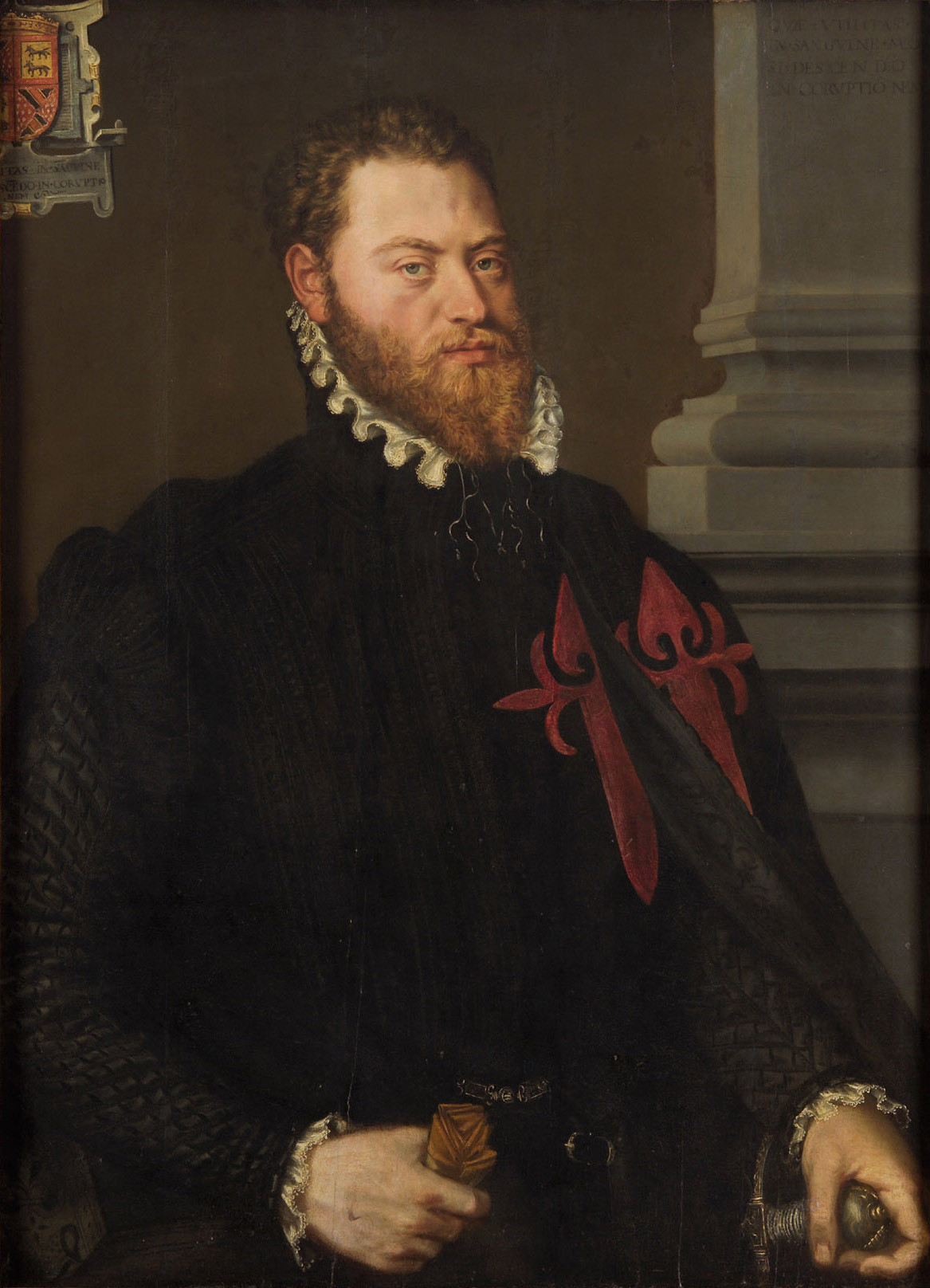
Portrait of Íñigo López de Mendoza with the embroidered cross of the order, by Frans Pourbus the Elder

The mildness of this rule furthered the rapid spread of the order, which eclipsed the older orders of Calatrava and Alcántara, and whose power was reputed abroad even before 1200. The first Bull of confirmation, that of Pope Alexander III, already enumerated a large number of endowments. At its height Santiago alone had more possessions than Calatrava and Alcántara together. In Spain, these possessions included 83 commanderies (of which 3 were reserved to the grand commanders), 2 cities, 178 boroughs and villages, 200 parishes, 5 hospitals, 5 convents, and 1 college at Salamanca. The number of knights was then 400 and they could muster more than 1000 lances. They had possessions in Portugal, France, Italy, Hungary, and even Palestine. Abrantes, their first commandery in Portugal, dates from the reign of Afonso I in 1172, and soon became a distinct order which Pope Nicholas IV released from the jurisdiction of Uclés in 1290.

Their military history is linked with that of the Iberian states. They assisted in the eviction of the Muslims and doing battle with them, sometimes separately, sometimes with the royal armies, a notable example being the conquest of Algarve, in modern-day Portugal. They also had a share in the fatal dissensions which disturbed the Christians of Iberia and brought about more than one schism in the order. Finally they took part in the maritime expeditions against the Muslims. Thus arose the obligation imposed upon aspirants to serve six months in the galleys, which still existed in the eighteenth century, but from which exemption was easily purchased. Authority was exercised by a grand master assisted by a Council of Thirteen, which elected the grand master and had the right to depose him for due cause; they had supreme jurisdiction in all disputes between members of the order. The first grand master, Pedro Fernández de Castro, died in 1184. He had had 39 successors, among them several Spanish Infantes, when, in 1499, Ferdinand the Catholic induced the pope to assign to him the administration of the order.

==== Council of Orders ====
Under Charles V, Pope Adrian VI annexed to the crown of Spain the three great military orders (Alcántara, Calatrava, and Santiago) with hereditary transmission even in the female line (1522). Thenceforth the three orders were united under one government, though their titles and possessions remained separate. To discharge the detail of this administration, Charles V instituted a special ministry, the Council of Orders, composed of a president named by the king, whom he represented, and six knights, two delegates from each order. To this council belonged the presentation of knights to vacant commanderies and jurisdiction in all matters, civil or ecclesiastical, save the purely spiritual cases reserved for ecclesiastical dignitaries. Thus ended the autonomy of the orders, but not their prestige.

=== Modernity ===
The Order of Santiago still exists under the protection of the Spanish Crown. As of 2014, there were 35 knights and 30 novices in the order. Admission to the Order was restricted to applicants of noble blood. Until 1653, nobility was checked by looking at only the paternal grandparents' family history. Changes were made so that maternal grandparents are included in verifying noble ancestry. The applicant must be a practicing Roman Catholic, be of legitimate birth through both parents and grandparents, not be descended from non-Christians, and prove at least 200 years of confirmed nobility of birth (not of privilege) from each of their four grandparents by legitimate marriage. Duties added in 1655 included defence of the belief in the Immaculate Conception of Mary.

Their symbol is a cross of Saint James, a red cross terminating in a sword (cross fleury fitchy in heraldry), which recalls their title De la Espada.

== Internal organization ==
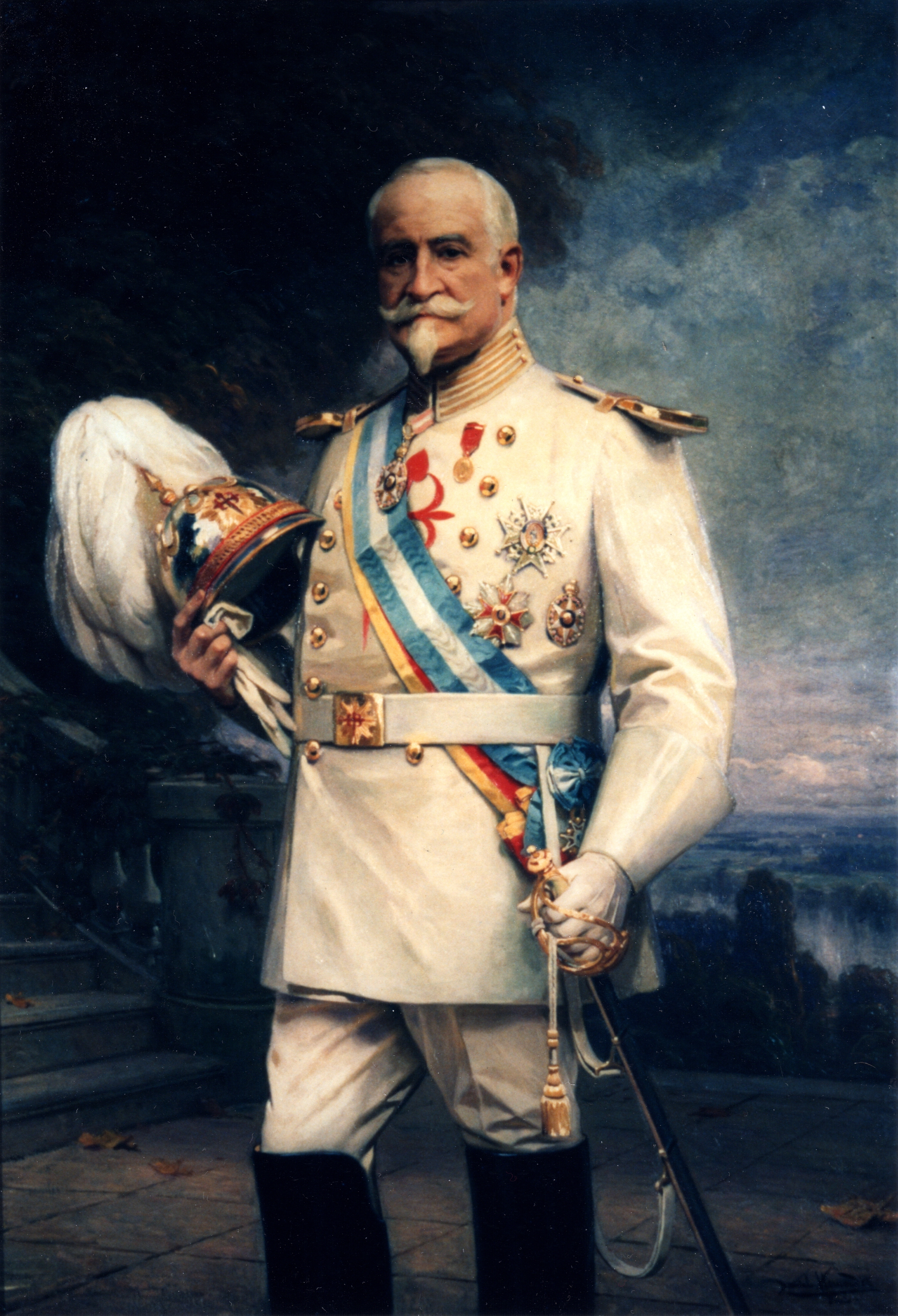
The 3rd Count of Guaqui in the uniform of the order, c. 1910

=== Prerequisites for entrance into the Order ===
In its beginnings, entrance into the Order was not difficult, but after mid-thirteenth century it became more complicated.

Once the Reconquest was finalized, a candidate who wished to join the Order of Santiago must have proved in his first four last names that he, his parents, and his grandparents were of noble descent by blood and not by privilege, and had never worked in manual or industrial labor.

Many classes of people were permanently disqualified from membership of the order due to their origins or circumstances. They included the following categories and their descendants: Jews, Muslims, heretics, converts to Christianity, or a mixture of these, no matter how far removed. Also included were people who had been punished for acts against the Catholic faith; had been an attorney, moneylender, notary public, retail merchant, or had worked where they lived or would have lived from their trade; had been dishonoured, had neglected the laws of honor and executed any act not proper for a perfect gentleman, or who lacked means of support. The prospective member then had to live three months in the galleys and reside for a month in the monastery to learn the Rule.

Later the King and the Council of the Orders abolished many of these prerequisites.

=== The convents ===
The Order of Santiago operated convents, both male and female. Aside from the convents for friars of Uclés and San Marcos (León), the Order had other convents in Vilar de Donas (a church in Palas de Rei, Lugo), Palmela (Portugal), Montánchez (Cáceres), Montalbán (Teruel) and Segura de la Sierra (Jaén).

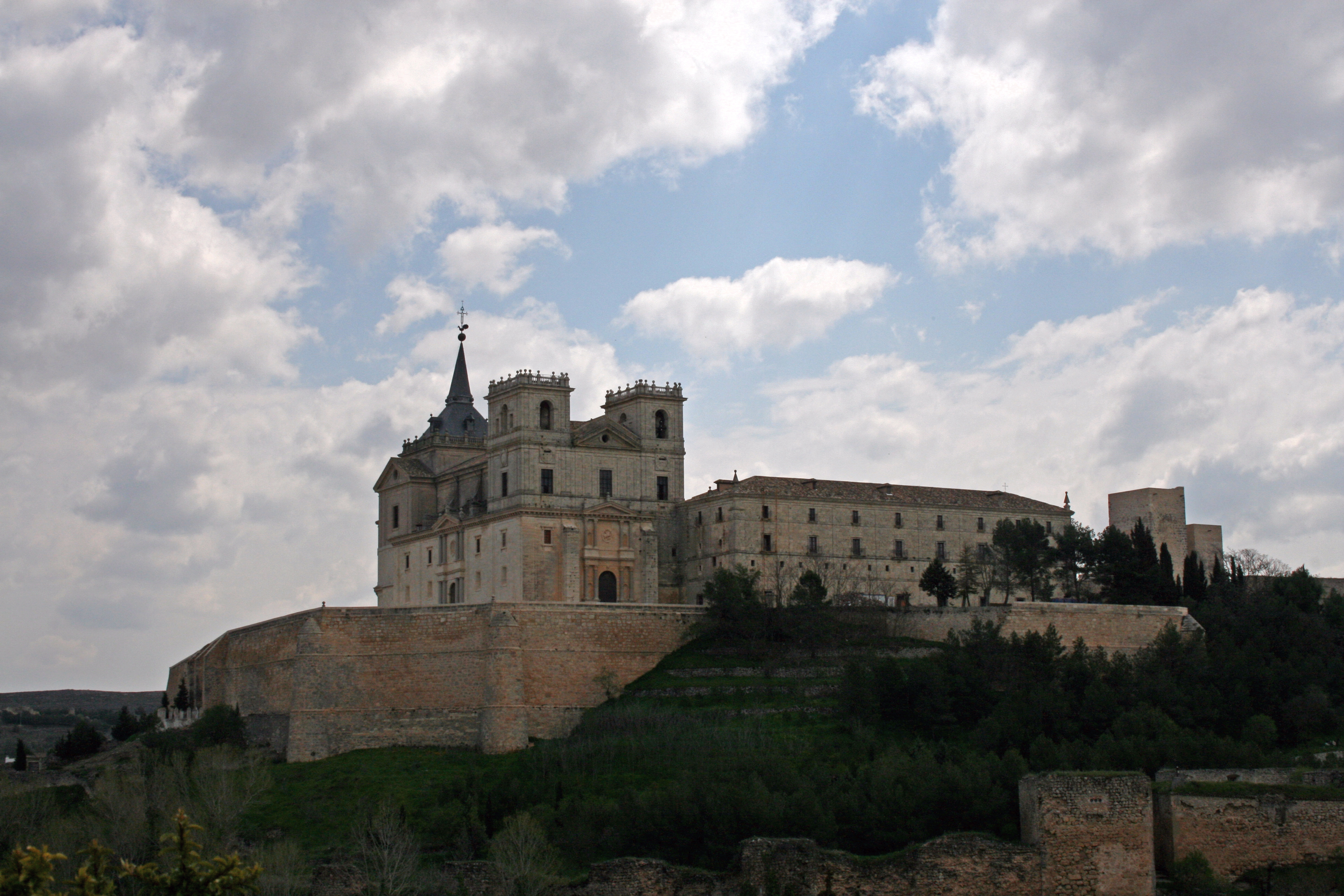
Monastery of Uclés, parent headquarters of the order, Cuenca Province, Spain

In 1275, the Order also had six convents for nuns, who called themselves the Mothers Superior. The wives and family of the friars could stay there when they went to war or died. The friars only professed conjugal chastity, but not everlasting, and because of this they could leave the convent and marry. The convents that are mentioned are: Santa Eufemia de Cozuelos (Palencia), founded in 1502; Convento de Sancti Spiritus of Salamanca, given to the Order in 1233; San Vicente de Junqueras (Barcelona), founded in 1212; San Pedro de la Piedra (1260), in Lérida; Santos-o-Velho (1194), in Lisbon and Destriana (León). The convents of Membrilla (Ciudad Real) and the Mothers Superior of Madrid (1650) came after these dates.

=== Territorial division ===
The Order was divided into several provinces, the most important ones being Castille and León because of their number of properties and vassals. At the head of each province there was a military commander with headquarters in Segura de la Sierra, Castilla and Segura de León, León. The province of León was divided into two parts, Mérida and Llerena; in each of them there were various encomiendas.

The most important internal subdivision of the military orders were called "encomiendas", which were local units directed by a knight commander of military order. The "encomienda" could place the headquarters or residence of the knight commander in a castle or fortress or in a small town and was the administrative or economic center in which the rents of the estate and properties relevant to that "encomienda" were paid and received; it was the habitual residence of the knight commander and some other knight.

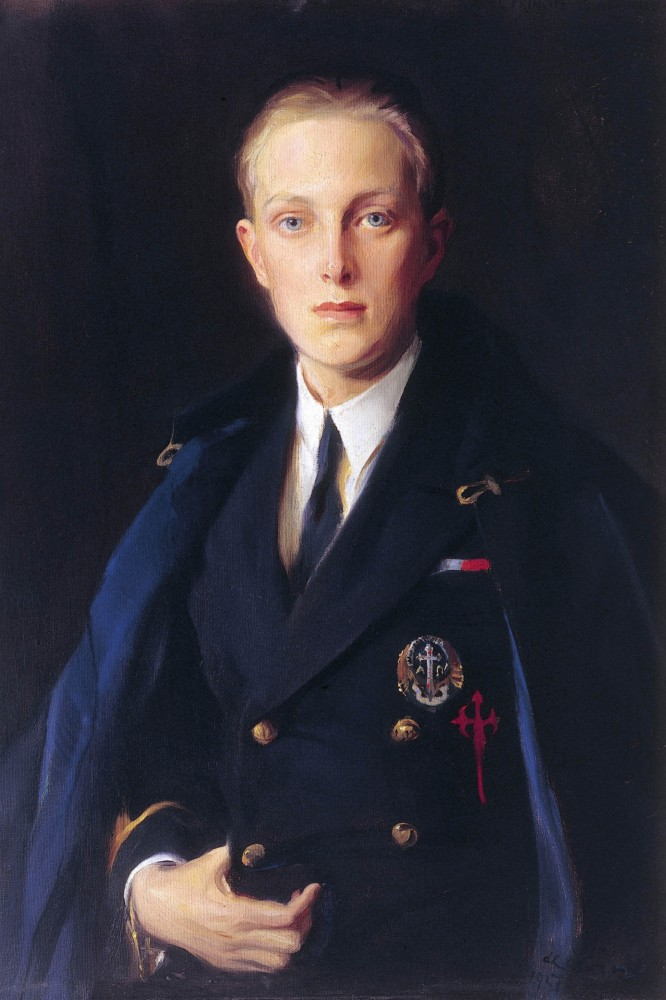
Infante Alfonso portrayed by László with the embroidered cross of the Order

Each "encomienda" had to support the knight commander and the other knights living there, and to pay and arm a certain number of spearmen, who had to be properly equipped and take part in military actions they were called to by their master. All of them formed the armed retinue or army of the Order, which answered to the orders of its master. The revenue of the Order came from land, pastures, industries, toll and right of way, taxes, and tithe. The revenue was allocated between the respective "encomiendas" and the board that financed the Master of the Order.

By 1185, the order possessed lands as far afield as France, England and Carinthia.

=== Female members ===
Women were admitted into the order from the beginning, since its members could marry. The work of the ladies of the order, who were required to be of noble status and to prove the purity of their blood (limpieza de sangre) with corresponding records, was limited to the task of educating the children of the knights. However, some were given authority over certain tasks.

== In popular culture ==
In the grand strategy game series Crusader Kings II and Crusader Kings III made by Paradox Interactive, the Order of Santiago can be created, as a militarized order akin to the Knights Templar.

Knights of Santiago are a unique crusading military units that can be raised by the Spanish faction in the game Medieval II: Total War, made by Creative Assembly.

== See also ==
- Order of Calatrava
- Balthazar Bourke, an Irish soldier and Knight of Santiago, fl. 1607

== Bibliography ==
- Cardinale, Hyginus Eugene (1985). Orders of Knighthood, Awards and the Holy See. Buckinghamshire: Colin Smythe. ISBN 9780905715261.
- Gallego Blanco, Enrique (1971). The Rule of the Spanish Military Order of St. James – 1170–1493. Brill.
- Linehan, Peter (2011). Spain:A Partible Inheritance, 1157–1300. Blackwell Publishing Ltd. ISBN 978-1444339758.
- O'Callaghan, Joseph F. (2003). Reconquest and Crusade in Medieval Spain. University of Pennsylvania Press. ISBN 9780812218893.
