= Pedro de Zuñiga y Manrique de Lara =

Castilian noble (1430–1484)

- 2nd Count of Ayamonte (1476 - 1484) 2ndCount of Bañares (1480 - 1484)
- Coat of arms of the Duchy of Béjar
- Reign: Kingdom of Castile
- Predecessor: Francisco de Zúñiga y Pérez de Guzmán Antonio de Zúñiga y Guzmán Bernardo de Zúñiga y Guzmán Leonor de Zúñiga y Guzmán Juana de Zúñiga y Guzmán Elvira de Zúñiga y Guzmán Isabel de Zúñiga y Guzmán
- Born: 1430
- Died: 1484 (aged 53–54)
- Spouse: Teresa de Guzmán (1454)

Pedro de Zúñiga y Manrique de Lara (1430 – 1484) was a Castilian noble of the House of Zúñiga, the 2nd Count of Bañares, the 1st Count of Ayamonte, a captain on the border with the Kingdom of Portugal, and the Chief Justice of Castile. As the eldest son of Álvaro de Zúñiga y Guzmán, 1st Duke of Béjar, 1st Duke of Plasencia, and 1st Count of Bañares, Pedro predeceased his father by four years and thus did not succeed him in his ducal titles.

== Lineage ==
Pedro was the son of Álvaro de Zúñiga y Guzmán, 2nd Count of Plasencia, initially 1st Duke of Arévalo (a title later reverted to the Crown), then 1st Duke of Plasencia and 1st Duke of Béjar, 1st Count of Bañares, Chief Justice of Castile, and High Constable of Castile, as well as the First Knight of the Realm. His mother was Álvaro’s first wife, Leonor Manrique de Lara y Castilla, daughter of Pedro Manrique de Lara y Mendoza, 8th Lord of Amusco , High Adelantado of León, and his wife Leonor de Castilla.

In 1454, Pedro married Teresa de Guzmán in Seville. She was the daughter of Juan Alonso Pérez de Guzmán, 3rd Count of Niebla and 1st Duke of Medina Sidonia, and his first cousin Elvira de Guzmán, daughter of Alonso Pérez de Guzmán, 3rd Lord of Ayamonte. The marriage contract and dowry were formalized on February 27, 1454. As part of the dowry, Pedro received the lordship of Ayamonte, including the towns of Lepe and La Redondela. From this marriage, they had four sons and four daughters:

- Álvaro de Zúñiga y Pérez de Guzmán, the eldest son and heir to his grandfather, who became the 2nd Duke of Béjar and 2nd Duke of Plasencia.
- Francisco de Zúñiga y Pérez de Guzmán, 2nd Count of Ayamonte, elevated to 1st Marquis of Ayamonte in 1525.
- Antonio de Zúñiga y Guzmán, Prior of Castile in the Order of Saint John of Jerusalem and Viceroy of Catalonia from 1523 to 1525.
- Bernardo de Zúñiga y Guzmán, Commander in the Order of Alcántara.
- Leonor de Zúñiga y Guzmán, married to Juan Alonso Pérez de Guzmán y de Ribera, 5th Count of Niebla and 3rd Duke of Medina Sidonia.
- Juana de Zúñiga y Guzmán, married to Carlos Ramírez de Arellano, 2nd Count of Aguilar de Inestrillas.
- Elvira de Zúñiga y Guzmán, married to Esteban de Ávila y Toledo, 2nd Count of Risco.
- Isabel de Zúñiga y Guzmán, married to Gonzalo Mariño de Ribera, governor of Bugía.

== Castilian Civil War (1465–1474) ==
Following his father’s political stance, Pedro sought in 1465 to rally Seville in support of Prince Alfonso. He occupied the Triana Castle, where Gonzalo de Saavedra, a commander, served as governor. However, his father-in-law, Juan Alonso de Guzmán, 1st Duke of Medina Sidonia, opposed this move and forced him to abandon the castle. At the urging of his father, Álvaro de Zúñiga y Guzmán, 2nd Count of Plasencia, who persuaded Juan Alonso de Guzmán, Juan Ponce de León, 2nd Count of Arcos, and Pedro Girón, Master of the Order of Calatrava, Seville eventually rose in favor of Prince Alfonso.

Between July 21 and 25, 1470, riots broke out in Seville due to the rivalry between Enrique de Guzmán, 2nd Duke of Medina Sidonia (supported by Pedro de Zúñiga), and Juan Ponce de León, 2nd Count of Arcos. The intervention of Christian mediators eventually pacified the factions.

In 1473, an agreement was reached to march from Seville to recapture the Alanís Castle, held since 1472 by Juan Ponce de León, now 1st Marquess of Cádiz. Strategically located, the castle controlled the roads from Seville to Carmona and from Seville to Extremadura. The assault was launched from three fronts: the Seville banner led by the Duke of Medina Sidonia, another by Pedro de Zúñiga, and a third by Fernando de Ribadeneyra, a Seville official. With assistance from Pedro Enríquez, Adelantado of Andalusia, the castle was taken. The Marquess of Cádiz retreated to Jerez, and the Duke of Medina Sidonia returned to Seville, though their armed forces continued skirmishing. When fighting reached Seville’s gates, Pedro de Zúñiga and the duke’s brothers, Pedro and Alonso de Guzmán, fought fiercely. The duke’s brothers were mortally wounded, and while Pedro de Zúñiga’s horse was killed, he escaped capture.

On December 4, 1475, King Ferdinand V "the Catholic" left Valladolid for Burgos, accompanied by the Duke of Alba, the Count of Benavente, Gutierre de Cárdenas, and Pedro de Zúñiga. Pedro sought control of the Burgos fortress, held by his uncle Iñigo López de Zúñiga y Avellaneda, offering to pledge homage to the Catholic Monarchs and cover the siege’s costs. After a siege lasting over four months, Iñigo surrendered the fortress to the Catholic Monarchs on January 28, 1476.

== Captain of the Portuguese Border ==
The Catholic Monarchs appointed Pedro de Zúñiga and Alonso de Cárdenas to oversee the defense of the Portuguese border, a role they assumed in early 1476. On February 23, 1476, Queen Isabella I "the Catholic" issued a royal order allowing Pedro to freely export wheat from Andalusia to supply his garrisons along the border. By a royal decree dated November 23, 1478, Isabella ordered all cities, towns, and villages in Andalusia to assist Pedro when requested, as he was tasked with preventing the Portuguese from fortifying Lepe or Gibraleón, which they appeared intent on doing. On September 14, 1479, Pedro, as 1st Count of Ayamonte and border captain, requested an inquiry into the bread needed for his coastal towns along the Portuguese frontier.

== Legacy ==
Pedro’s tutor and mentor was Mosén Diego de Valera, who later became a chronicler for the Catholic Monarchs. His father, Álvaro de Zúñiga y Guzmán, remarried in 1458 to his niece Leonor Pimentel de Zúñiga, daughter of Juan Alonso Pimentel, Count of Mayorga. Leonor, much younger and reportedly avaricious, sought to undermine the children from Álvaro’s first marriage. At the urging of Diego de Jerez, Álvaro reconciled with Pedro in Plasencia in 1475. That December, Pedro visited Queen Isabella in Tordesillas, where she warmly received him, valuing his service, loyalty, and steadfastness. She urged him to forgive his father’s missteps, attributing them to old age and the greed of his second wife.

In 1475, the Catholic Monarchs granted Pedro the title of 1st Count of Ayamonte for his services during the civil war. In 1476, they appointed him Chief Justice of Castile by royal decree. On January 12, 1476, a privilege issued in Zamora confirmed Pedro’s possession of the city of Plasencia, Cáceres province, as the son of Álvaro de Zúñiga, 1st Duke of Plasencia. On January 30, 1476, the Catholic Monarchs granted him certain properties inherited from his father.

On July 29, 1477, Pedro petitioned Queen Isabella to nullify any donations of his vassals or fortresses from his entailed estate, and on October 2, 1477, he requested the return of his entailed properties. On January 14, 1478, Isabella confirmed, via a privilege issued in Zamora, an annuity of 600 quintals of oil for him.

On June 9, 1478, Prince John, the eldest son of the Catholic Monarchs, was baptized in Seville Cathedral, with Cardinal Pedro González de Mendoza officiating. Pedro de Zúñiga joined the subsequent procession, assisting a page who carried a heavy silver tray bearing candles, a baptismal cap, and a gold offering. In 1480, he inherited the title of Count of Bañares from his father.

Pedro de Zúñiga, 2nd Count of Bañares and 1st Count of Ayamonte, executed his will on July 21, 1480. On May 28, 1482, he consented to his father’s donation of the lordships and towns of Burguillos and Capilla, Badajoz province, to his stepmother Leonor Pimentel, swearing not to contest it.

== Bibliography ==
- Atienza, Julio de (1959). Nobiliario Español [Spanish Nobiliary] (in Spanish). Madrid: Aguilar SA Ediciones.
- López de Haro, Alonso (1622). Nobiliario Genealógico de los Reyes y Títulos de España [Genealogical Nobiliary of the Kings and Titles of Spain] (in Spanish). Madrid: Impr. Luis Sánchez.
- Menéndez y Pidal, Ramón (1983). Historia de España, Volume XVII, Volume 1, La España de los Reyes Católicos [History of Spain, Volume XVII, Volume 1, The Spain of the Catholic Monarchs] (in Spanish). Madrid: Editorial Espasa-Calpe. ISBN 84-239-4819-6.
- Menéndez y Pidal, Ramón (1983). Historia de España, Volume XVII, Volume 2, La España de los Reyes Católicos [History of Spain, Volume XVII, Volume 2, The Spain of the Catholic Monarchs] (in Spanish). Madrid: Editorial Espasa-Calpe SA. ISBN 84-239-4820-X.
- Ortiz de Zúñiga, Diego (1677). Annales Eclesiásticos y Seculares de la muy Noble y muy Leal Ciudad de Sevilla, Metrópoli de Andalucía,... desde el año de 1246 ... hasta el de 1671 ... [Ecclesiastical and Secular Annals of the Very Noble and Very Loyal City of Seville, Metropolis of Andalusia,.... from the year 1246 ... to the year 1671 ...] (in Spanish). Madrid: Imprenta Real.
- Sánchez Loro, Domingo (1959). El Parecer de un Deán (Don Diego de Jerez, Consejero de los Reyes Católicos, Servidor de los Duques de Plasencia, Deán y Protonotario de su Iglesia Catedral) [El Parecer de un Deán (Don Diego de Jerez, Advisor to the Catholic Monarchs, Servant of the Dukes of Plasencia, Dean and Prothonotary of his Cathedral Church).] (in Spanish) (Biblioteca Extremeña, Publicaciones del Movimiento ed.). Cáceres: Tipografía, El Noticiero.

Preceded by Álvaro de Zúñiga y Guzmán	County of Bañares; 1480–1488	Succeeded by Álvaro de Zúñiga y Pérez de Guzmán
Preceded by Newly created title	County of Ayamonte; 1475 - 1484	Succeeded by Francisco de Zúñiga y Pérez de Guzmán
