= Corbatón =

Coordinates: 40°46′40″N 1°05′16″W

- Town
- Interactive map of Corbatón
- Country: Spain
- Autonomous Community: Aragon
- Province: Teruel
- Comarca: Jiloca
- Municipality: Cosa
- Elevation: 1,218 m (3,996 ft)

Population
  - Total: 11
- Postal code: 44721

Corbatón is a town in Cosa, Jiloca, Teruel, Spain.
