= Liga Nobiliaria =

14th-15th-century Spanish Nobility League

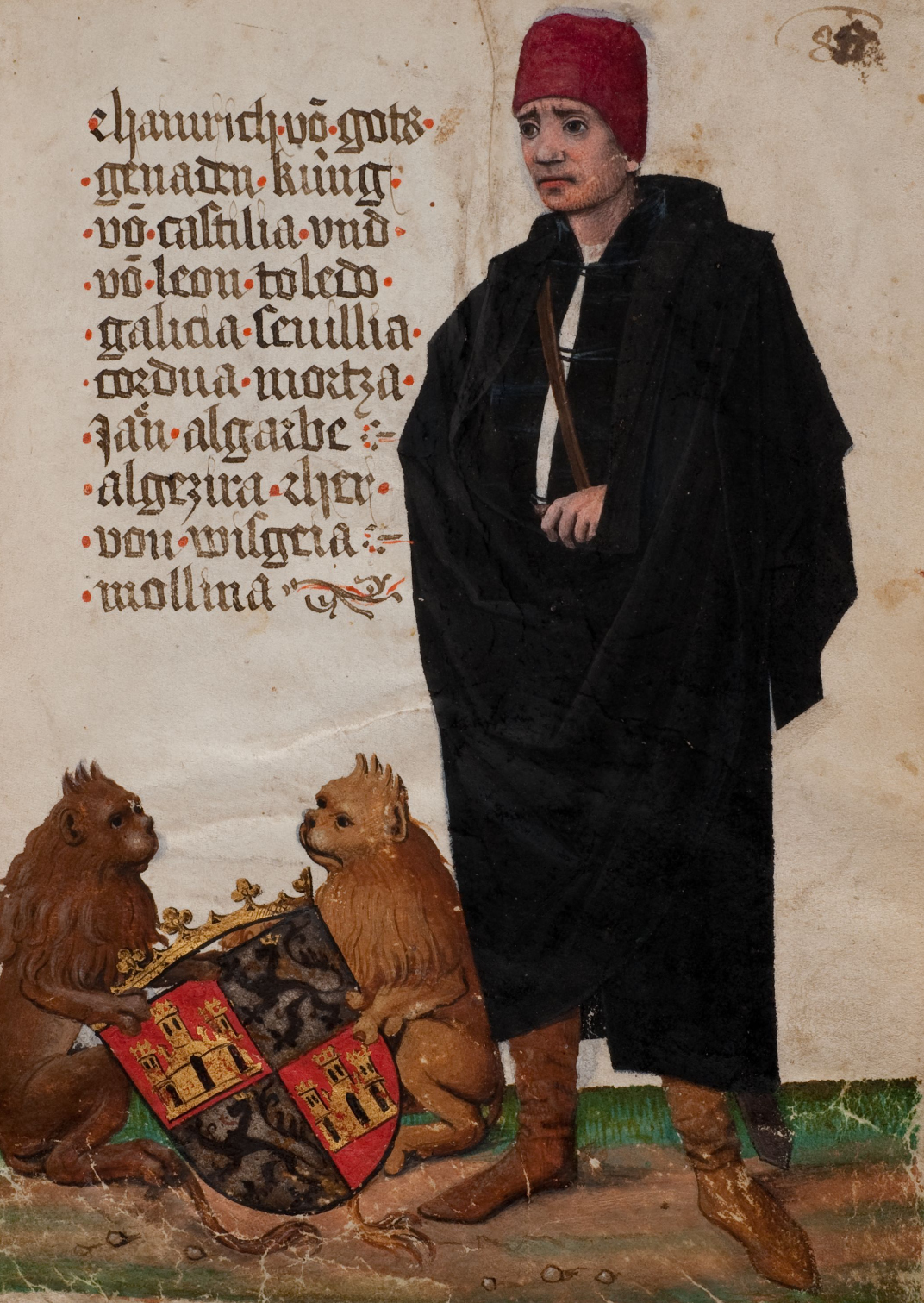
King Henry IV.

The term Liga Nobiliaria (in Castilian: Liga Nobiliaria or Gran Liga Nobiliaria, in English: Noble League) is generally used to designate political movements of nobles of the Kingdom of Castile that arose in the 14th and 15th centuries. They are equivalent to today's parties, and were motivated mainly by attempts of monarchs to diminish the opposition's powers and privileges.

In a broad sense, the term "Noble League" or "League of Nobility" appears associated with the more or less volatile associations formed by the Castilian nobles of the Middle Ages to oppose the tendencies toward centralization and concentration of power on the part of the kings and the forces closest to them.

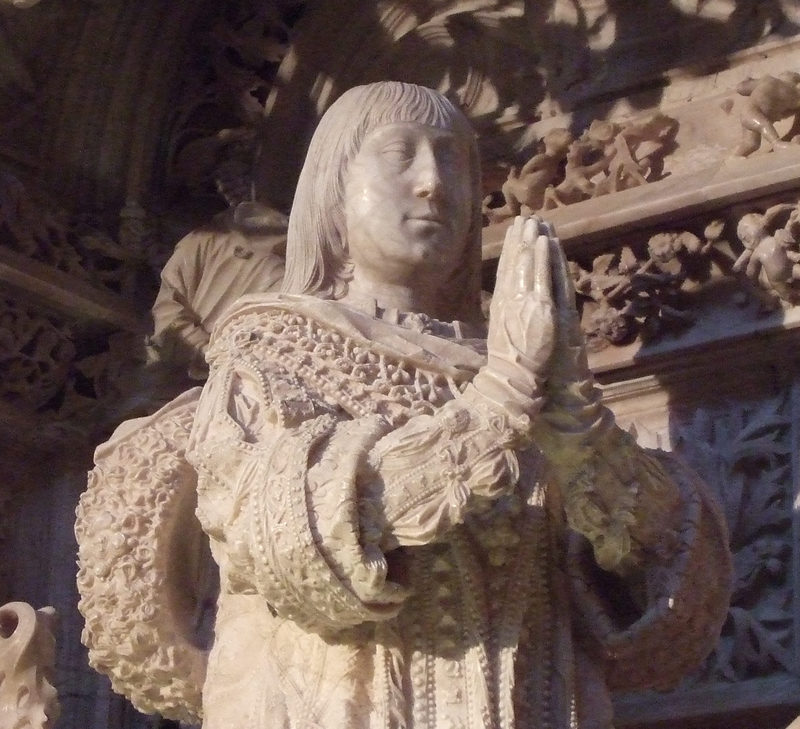
Prince Alfonso of Castile.

It is common for the term to apply specifically to the group of nobles formed in the mid-15th century who participated in the Farce of Ávila, in this city on June 5, 1465. It consisted in a staged deposition of Henry IV and the proclamation of his brother Alfonso as king.

== Overview ==
The league was officially founded on May 16, 1464, to defend the rights of the infante Alfonso to the throne and to prevent the infanta Isabella from marrying without the league's consent. They had previously formed a "league for the 'Good of the Kingdom' and 'recognition of Prince Alfonso'" in 1460, which John II of Aragon and Navarre joined on April 1, 1460.

The group played a pivotal role in the political-military conflicts that marked the second half of the 15th century in Castile and in the War of the Castilian Succession, during which the league supported Joanna la Beltraneja and her husband Afonso V of Portugal against the Catholic Monarchs.

Although most of the nobles in the noble leagues supported Joanna's succession to the throne of Castile after the death of her father Henry, sometimes the term "noble league" is also used to refer to the nobles who supported Isabella, led by the Mendoza, whose head was then Pedro González de Mendoza.

== History ==
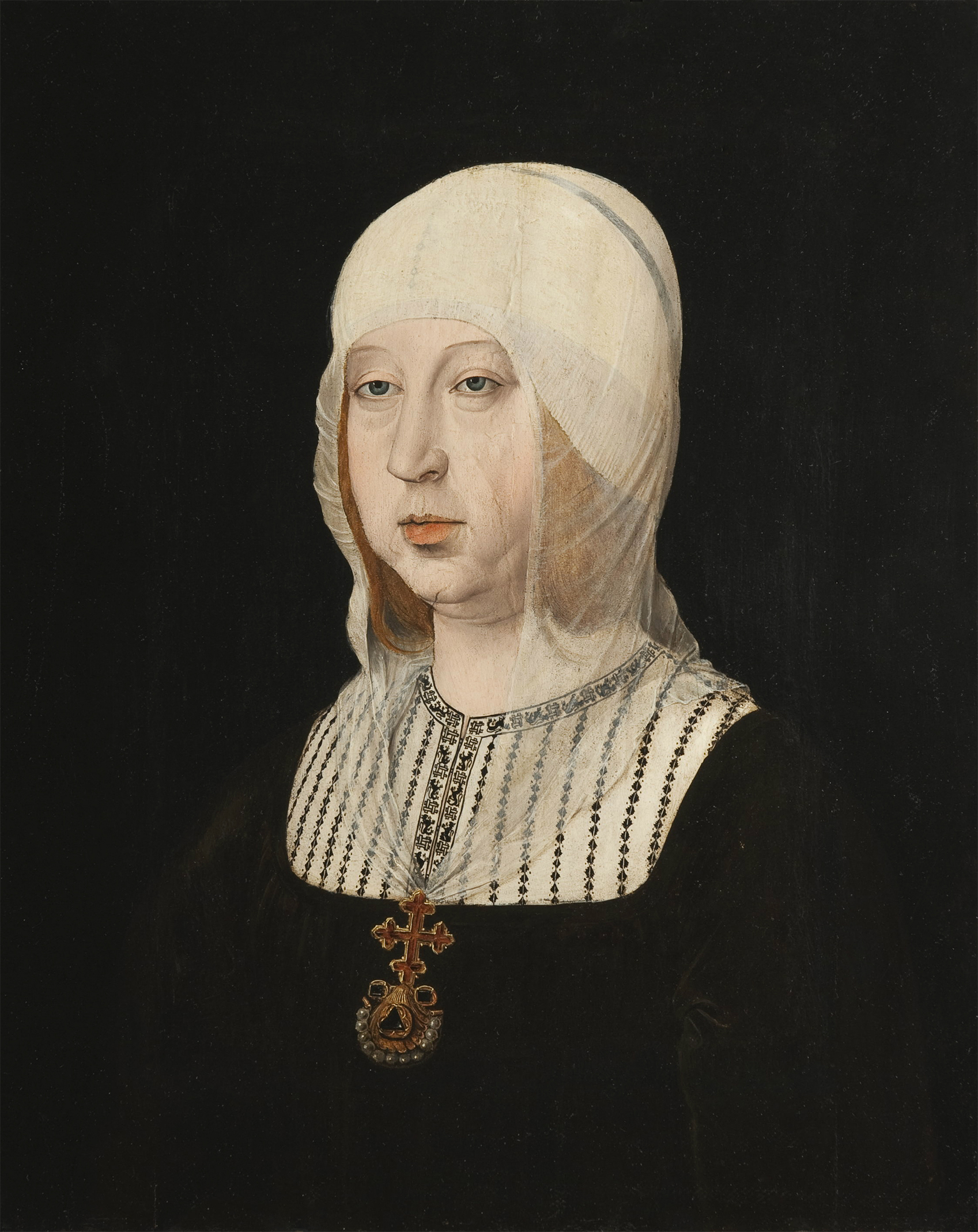
Isabella I of Castile, "the Catholic".

The 14th and 15th centuries in Castile were marked by a power struggle between supporters of a stronger royal power and the large feudal lords. The Castilian Civil War (1366-1369) was won by Henry II with the support of the nobles, but the nobles lost some of their influence during the reign of Henry III, regaining it again in the reign of John II, especially when the then-called Gran Liga Nobiliaria managed to eliminate Álvaro de Luna, constable and favourite of John II.

The reign of John II's successor, Henry IV was marked by successive conflicts between the king and the most powerful nobles, who tried to control the appointment of the royal heir/heiress and diminish the influence of Beltrán de La Cueva, the king's constable and favourite, and, according to rumours, the lover of Queen Joan.

The marriage agreement between Isabella and Alfonso V of Portugal, and Henry IV in April 1464 led the nobles to formalize a league on May 16, 1464, to defend the rights of succession of Prince Alfonso and to prevent Isabella from marrying without the consent of the nobles. Joanna was then only two years old and rumors were circulating that she was the daughter, not of the king, but of Beltrán de La Cueva, which is the origin of her nickname "la Beltraneja."

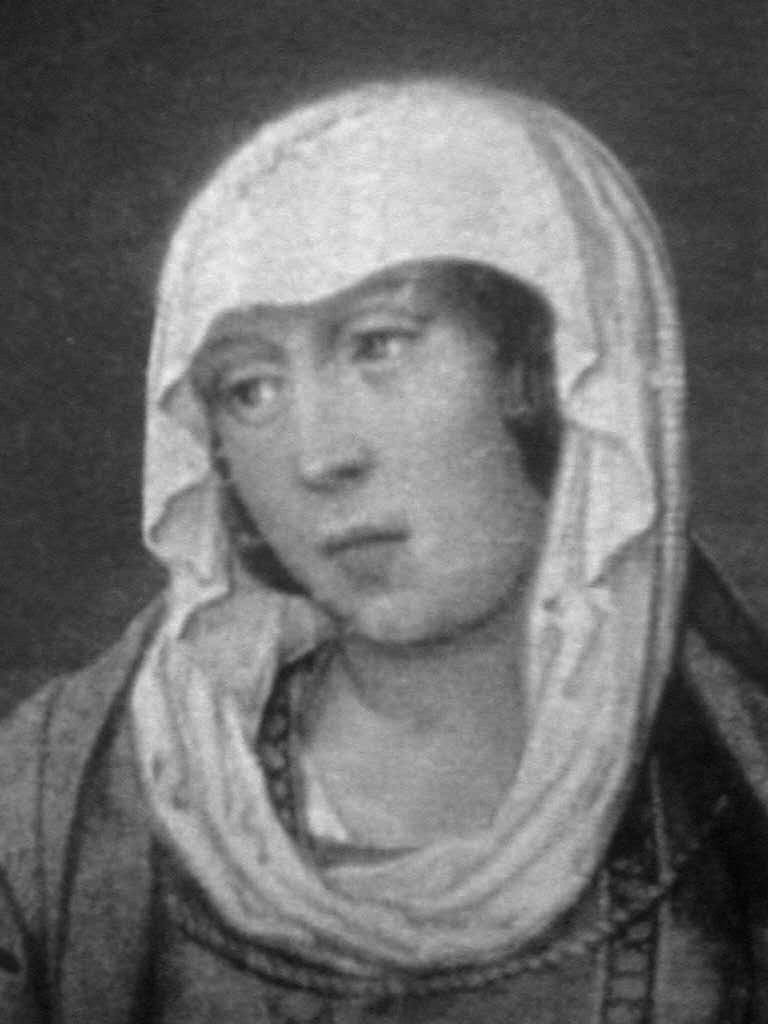
Joanna la Beltraneja.

On June 5, 1465, the league organized what became known as the Farce of Ávila, where they acclaimed Alfonso as king. Before his death, on June 5, 1468, there were already schisms in the league: One of its most prominent leaders, Álvaro de Zúñiga y Guzmán, Count of Plasencia and head of the influential House of Zúñiga, reconciled with Henry IV in 1467. The marriage without royal consent of Isabella to Ferdinand II, king of Sicily and successor to the throne of Aragon, contributed to the Liga Nobiliaria's shift in support of the king, who rehabilitated his daughter Joanna as his legitimate successor on July 26, 1470.

After Henry's death on December 12, 1474, Isabella was proclaimed queen the next day in Segovia. In March 1475, Álvaro de Zúñiga took Joanna to Trujillo, where she was acclaimed Henry's legitimate successor. The Portuguese king Afonso V decided to marry Joanna, then 13 years old, and claimed the crown of Castile for himself. In early May 1475, Afonso V entered Castile with his army and was received in Plasencia by Zúñiga and other members of the league who support the claims of the Portuguese king. Alfonso and Joanna were proclaimed rulers of Castile and León on May 25, 1475.

The Portuguese king abandoned the war after being defeated at the Battle of Toro (March 1, 1476). The Zúñiga, who were among the main supporters of Afonso V and Joanna - although some of their members fought alongside Isabella's forces - had already adopted a strictly neutral position in January, unhappy with the little help provided by the king of Portugal, who let the castle of Burgos fall, a Zúñiga possession, without risking a short-distance march.

== Bibliography ==
- Franco Silva, Alfonso; Iglesias Rodríguez, Juan José; García Fernández, Manuel (1995). Osuna entre los tiempos medievales y modernos (siglos XIII-XVIII) (in Spanish). Fundación de Cultura Antonio María García Blanco. Universidade de Sevilha. ISBN 9788447202218.
- Leralta, Javier (2008). Apodos reales: historia y leyenda de los motes regios (in Spanish). Madrid: Sílex. ISBN 978-8477372110.
- Menéndez y Pidal, Ramón (1986). "Los Trastámaras de Castilla y Aragón en el siglo XV". Historia de España (in Spanish). Madrid: Editorial Espasa-Calpe.
- Menéndez y Pidal, Ramón (1983). "La España de los Reyes Católicos". Historia de España (in Spanish). Madrid: Editorial Espasa-Calpe SA. ISBN 84-239-4819-6.
- Sánchez Loro, Domingo (1959). El Parecer de un Deán (Don Diego de Jerez, Consejero de los Reyes Católicos, Servidor de los Duques de Plasencia, Deán y Protonotario de su Iglesia Catedral) (in Spanish). Cáceres: Biblioteca Extremeña, Publicaciones del Movimiento edición, Tipografía, El Noticiero.
