= Farce of Ávila =

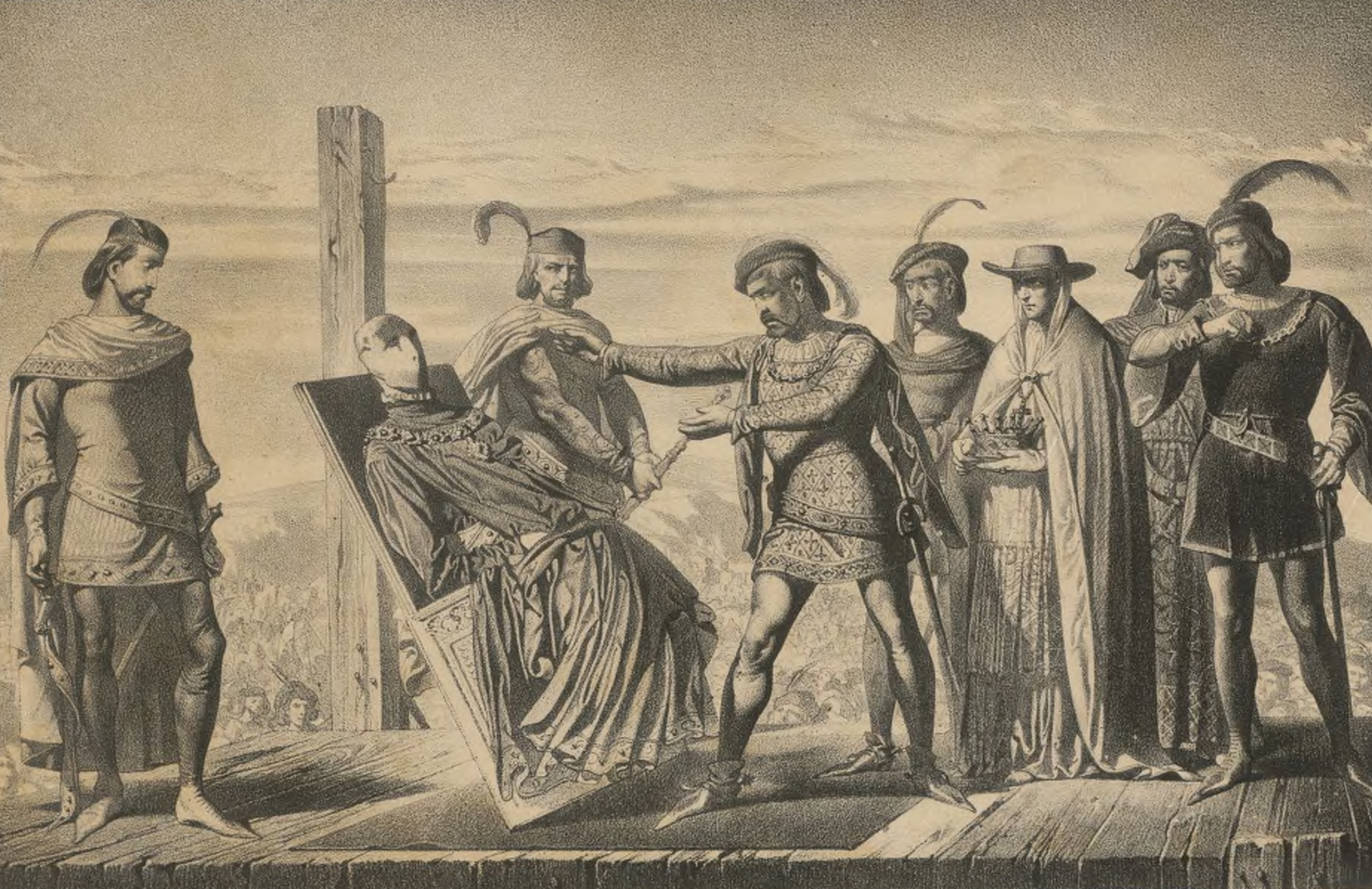
Depiction of the Farce of Ávila in a 19th-century lithograph

On 5 June 1465, in a location around Ávila, a group of Castilian noblemen deposed King Henry IV of Castile in effigy, and instead proclaimed his half-brother Prince Alfonso, better known as "Alfonso the Innocent", as king. This ceremony became known by its detractors as the farce of Ávila (Spanish: Farsa de Ávila).

== Background ==
During the reign of Henry IV, the various factions of the nobility fought among themselves and against the king to gain power. The powerful Marquis of Villena was unhappy with the preferential treatment by the king of his rivals, the House of Mendoza and the favourite Beltrán de la Cueva. The Marquis formed an alliance against the king (the Liga Nobiliaria) with the archbishops of Toledo, Seville, and Santiago, the House of Enríquez, the Count of Plasencia, the Count of Benavente, the Count of Alba, and other minor noblemen and clergymen.

On 11 December 1464, the Liga issued an ultimatum: if the king did not rectify his behavior and get rid of his government, he would be deposed. Henry tried to negotiate, but no agreement was reached, and the king was deposed, first in Plasencia on 27 April 1465, and later in Ávila on 5 June.

== Development of the ceremony ==
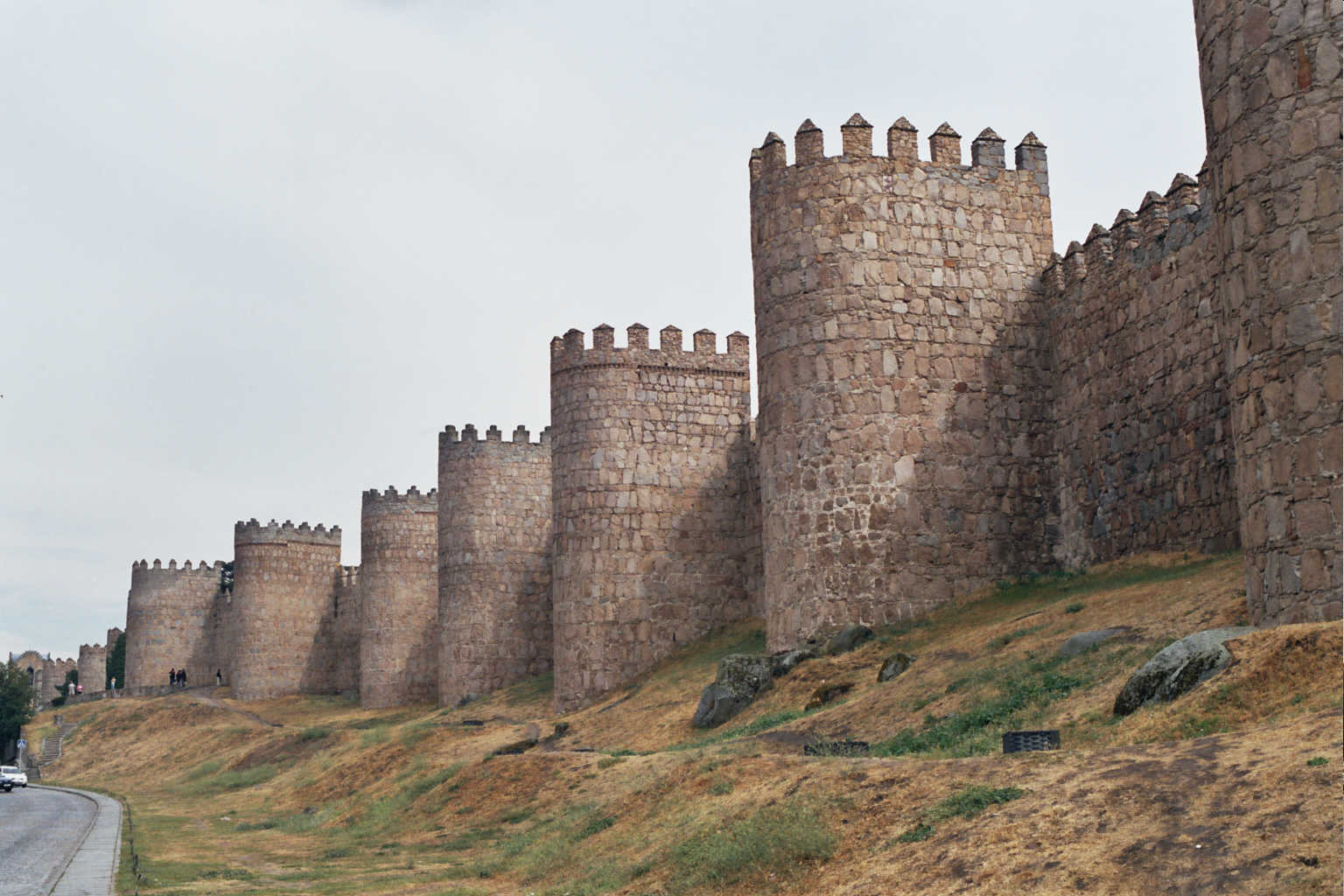
Medieval walls of Ávila.

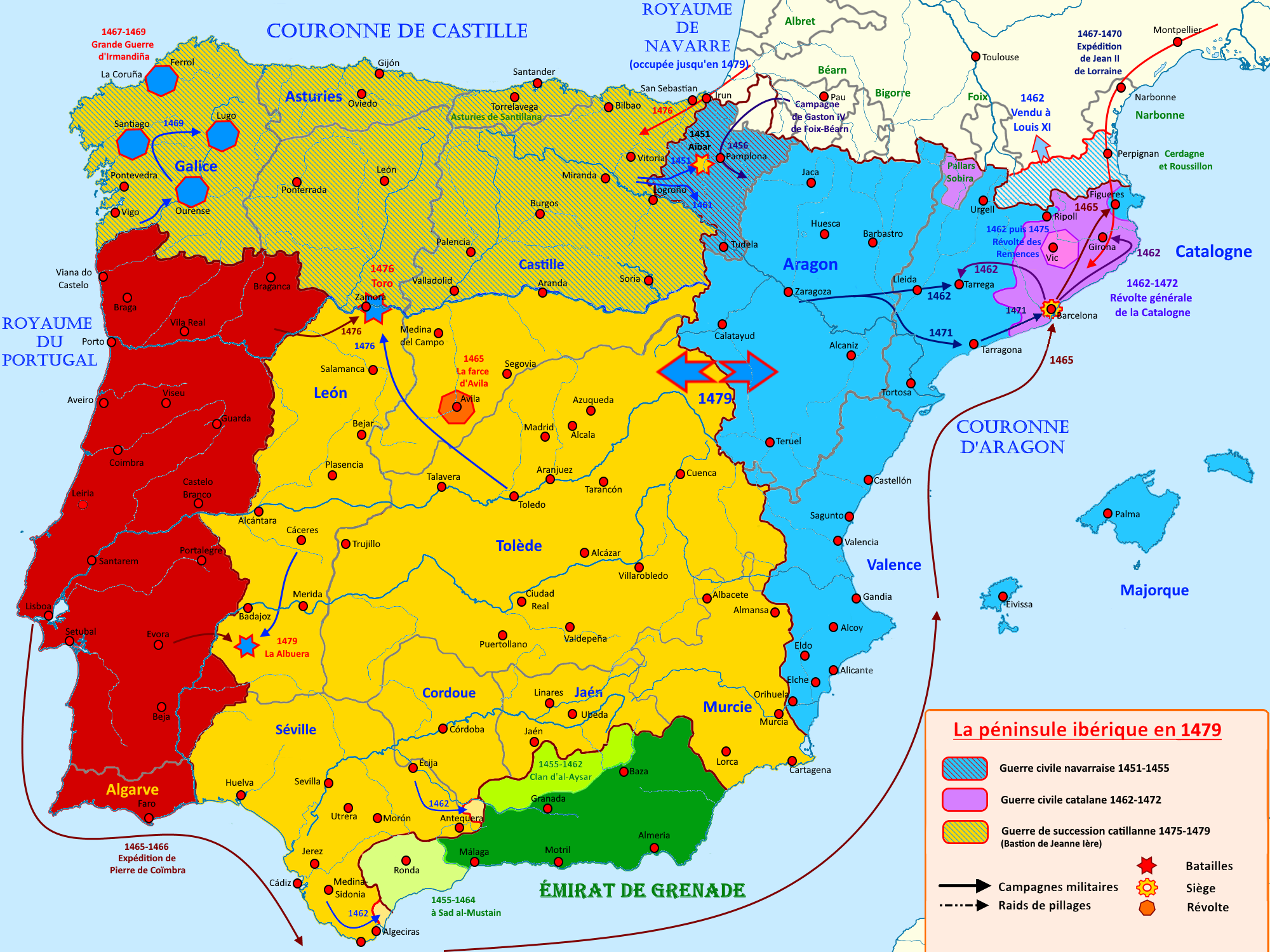
Map of Iberia in 1479, around the time of the Farce of Ávila.

On a large platform visible from a distance, the conspirators erected a wooden statue representing the king, dressed in mourning clothes and with his crown, staff, and sword. Those present at the ceremony were the Archbishop of Toledo, the Marquis of Villena, the Count of Plasencia, the Count of Benavente, and other minor noblemen, as well as the general population of commoners. Also present was Prince Alfonso, who had not yet reached eleven years of age.

Mass was performed, and once finished, the rebels headed to the stage to read a declaration of all the charges against Henry IV. According to them, the king showed sympathy towards Muslims (who still controlled the Emirate of Grenada); he was homosexual; his character was conciliatory and overcautious; and (the most serious charge) he was not the real father of Princess Joanna, which meant that she was ineligible to inherit the throne.

After the speech, the Archbishop of Toledo removed the crown from the effigy, which was the symbol of royal dignity. Then Plasencia took the sword, symbol of administration of justice, and Benavente took the staff, symbol of government. Finally, Diego López de Zúñiga, brother of Plasencia, tore down the statue, saying "To the ground, bitch!" (¡A tierra, puto!).

Then they brought the prince Alfonso to the platform, and proclaimed him king, yelling "Castile, by King Alfonso!" and proceeded with the hand-kissing ceremony.

== Consequences ==
The new king Alfonso XII was considered a puppet in the hands of Villena and was not accepted by the majority of the country, which remained loyal to Henry IV. The situation deteriorated into riots which lasted until the death of Alfonso in 1468 and the submission of his sister Isabel to the authority of Henry IV, But he did in fact rule as Alfonso XII in the three remaining years of his life after the coup, as described by the investigator Óscar Perea. He maintained a court with an active cultural life which included several important noblemen, such as like Diego Gómez Manrique and his nephew Jorge, the jurist Nicolás de Guevara, and the chansonnier poet Juan Álvarez Gato or historian Diego de Valera as his chief steward in 1467. as well as the Marquis of Villena; also Rodrigo Alfonso Pimentel, count of Benavente, and Pedro de Villandrando, count of Ribadeo, and Diego de Ribera, tutor of prince Alfonso and the person in charge of the stables, or Sancho de Rojas, lord of Cavia and Monzón and chief nobleman of Castile; Martín de Távara; the prior of Osma, jurist and royal chaplain to Alfonso XII Francisco Gómez de Miranda and others. His court also included prominent singers Diego Rangel o Cristóbal de Morales. Don Diego Gómez Manrique organized festivities and composed theatrical "momos" teatrales to celebrate the royal birthday in which the court ladies played the role of fairies. Of the brilliant poets in this court was Jorge Manrique and his Verses on the death of his father:

Later, the Marquis de Villena, his relatives and some of its allies broke with Isabel and dying Enrique in 1474, supported the Princess Juana as heiress to the throne, although not a few of the members of the Court of Alfonso XII spent the Elizabethan side and thrived on it. He thus broke the War of the Castilian Succession, which lasted until 1479.
