= Plasencia de Jalón =

Coordinates: 41°41′N 1°14′W

Plasencia de Jalón, Spain
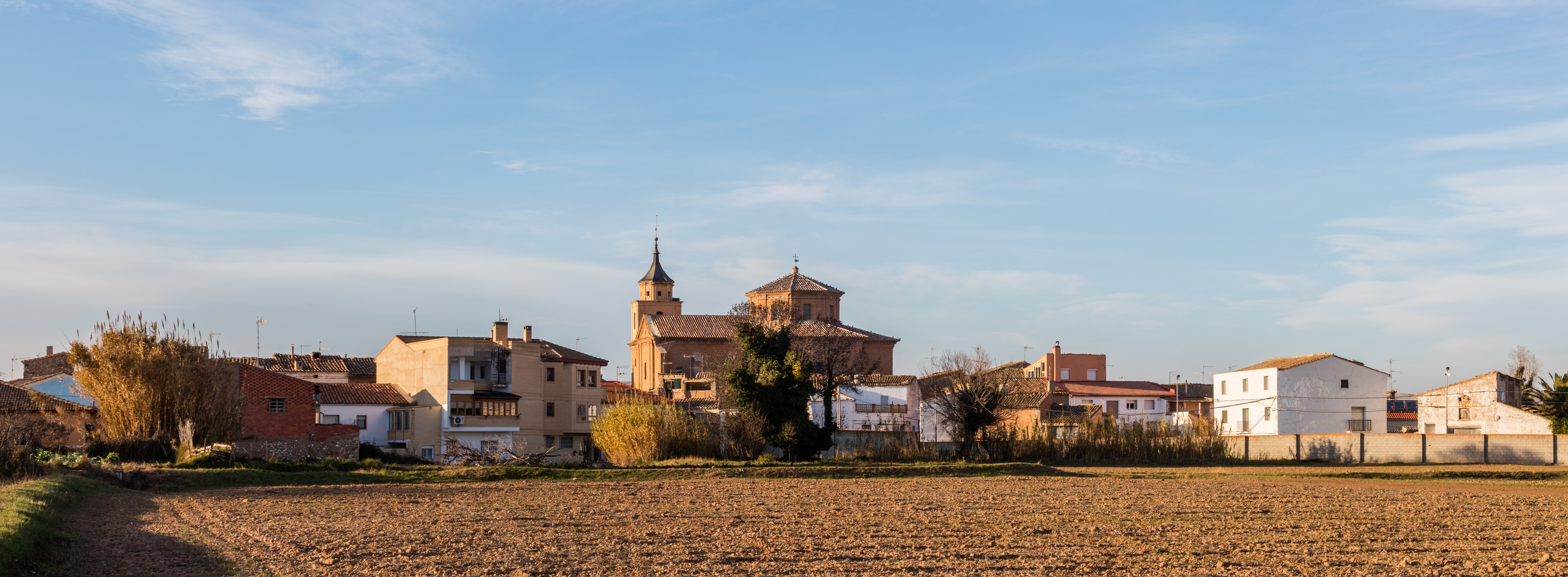

- Flag Coat of arms
- Interactive map of Plasencia de Jalón, Spain
- Country: Spain
- Autonomous community: Aragon
- Province: Zaragoza
- Municipality: Plasencia de Jalón

Area
  - Total: 34 km^{2} (13 sq mi)
- Elevation: 274 m (899 ft)

Population (2025-01-01)
  - Total: 378
  - Density: 11/km^{2} (29/sq mi)
- Time zone: UTC+1 (CET)
  - Summer (DST): UTC+2 (CEST)

Plasencia de Jalón is a municipality located in the province of Zaragoza, Aragon, Spain. According to the 2004 census (INE), the municipality has a population of 368 inhabitants.

== See also ==
- List of municipalities in Zaragoza
