= Mirabel, Spain =

Coordinates: 39°52′N 6°14′W

Mirabel
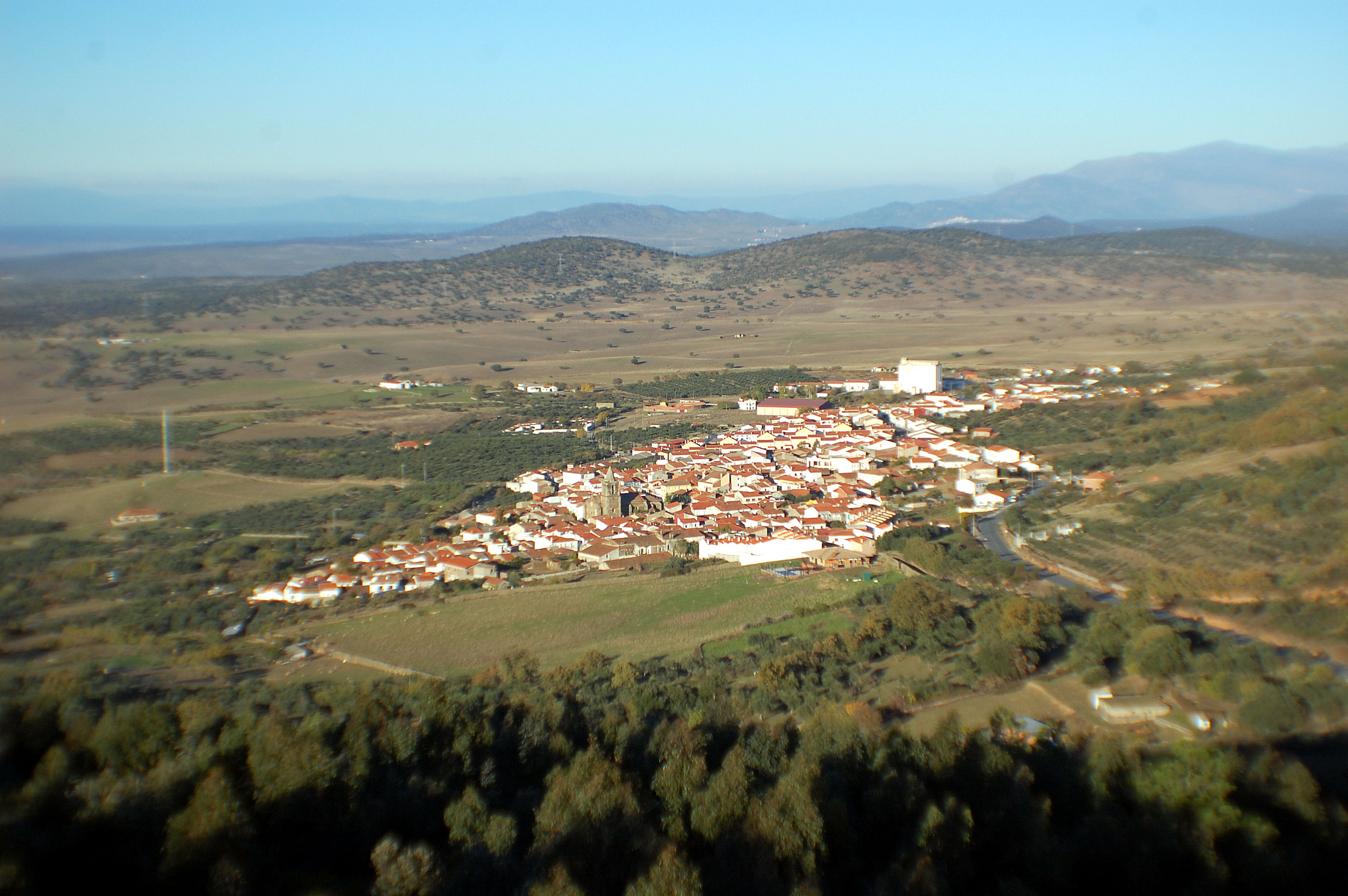
- View of Mirabel

- Flag Coat of arms

- Location in Spain.
- Country: Spain
- Autonomous community: Cáceres

Area
  - Total: 49.3 km^{2} (19.0 sq mi)
- Elevation: 488 m (1,601 ft)

Population (2025-01-01)
  - Total: 620
  - Density: 13/km^{2} (33/sq mi)
- Time zone: UTC+1 (CET)
  - Summer (DST): UTC+2 (CEST)
- Website: www.mirabel.es

Mirabel is a municipality in the province of Cáceres and autonomous community of Extremadura, Spain. The municipality covers an area of 20 square kilometres (7.7 sq mi).

== See also ==
- List of municipalities in Cáceres
