= Count of Plasencia =

Spanish nobility title

First concession of the nobility title
- Creation: 1442
- Created by: John II of Castile
- Peerage: • Zúñiga (Houses of Béjar and Plasencia)
- First holder: Pedro de Zúñiga y Leiva

Second concession of the nobility title
- Creation date: 1611
- Created by: Philip III of Spain
- Peerage: • Lanuza • Perellós • Marimón • Arróspide
- First holder: Pedro Lanuza y Ximénez de Urrea
- Present holder: Cristina de Arróspide y Núñez

The Count of Plasencia is a Spanish nobility title, created in 1611 by King Philip III, in favor of Pedro Lanuza y Ximénez de Urrea.

The title was granted in memory of the ancient dominion that the Lanuza family had exercised in the 16th century on Plasencia de Jalón, until it was dispossessed of it by Philip II, when his brother Juan de Lanuza was beheaded, for having supported Antonio Pérez, his secretary, who had invoked the Fueros of Aragon, to avoid being tried for the murder in El Escorial of Escobedo (secretary of Don Juan de Austria). Granted the Grandee of Spain on August 18, 1707.

Its denomination, of the current title in force, refers to the town of Plasencia de Jalón, in the province of Zaragoza.

== Background ==
The title of Count of Plasencia (in the kingdom of Castile), had been created for the first time in 1442, by John II of Castile, referring to Plasencia (locality of Extremadura) for Pedro de Zúñiga y Leiva, in exchange for the lordship of Trujillo, who transmitted it to his son Álvaro de Zúñiga y Guzmán who was the II and last Count of Plasencia, of this first concession.

The primitive county of Plasencia was extinguished in 1476, when the Catholic Monarchs elevated this county to a duchy with the same denomination, in favor of Álvaro de Zúñiga y Guzmán, in compensation for the loss of the Duchy of Arévalo, which reverted to the Crown.

== Counts of Plasencia ==
	Holder	Time
First concession by John II of Castile
I	Pedro de Zúñiga y Leiva	1442-1453
II	Álvaro de Zúñiga y Guzmán	1453-1476
	Holder	Time
First concession by Philip III of Spain
I	Pedro Lanuza y Ximénez de Urrea	1611-
II	Ferrer de Lanuza y Silva	1643
III	José de Lanuza y de Rocabertí	? -1688
IV	Juan de Lanuza y de Oms	? -1723
V	Francisco de Lanuza y de Gilabert	
VI	Juan Antonio de Lanuza y de Boxadors	? -1770
VII	María Helena de Lanuza y de Boxadors	? -1806
VIII	Josefa Rabasa de Perellós y Lanuza	
IX	María Dolores de Marimón Queri	
X	José María de Arróspide y Marimón	? -1893
XI	José María de Arróspide y Álvarez	1893-1936
XII	Francisco de Arróspide y Arróspide	
XIII	Íñigo de Arróspide y Valera	-1983
XIV	Álvaro de Arróspide y López de Letona	1983-2012
XV	Cristina de Arróspide y Núñez	2012 - at present
