= Buitrago =

- Municipality
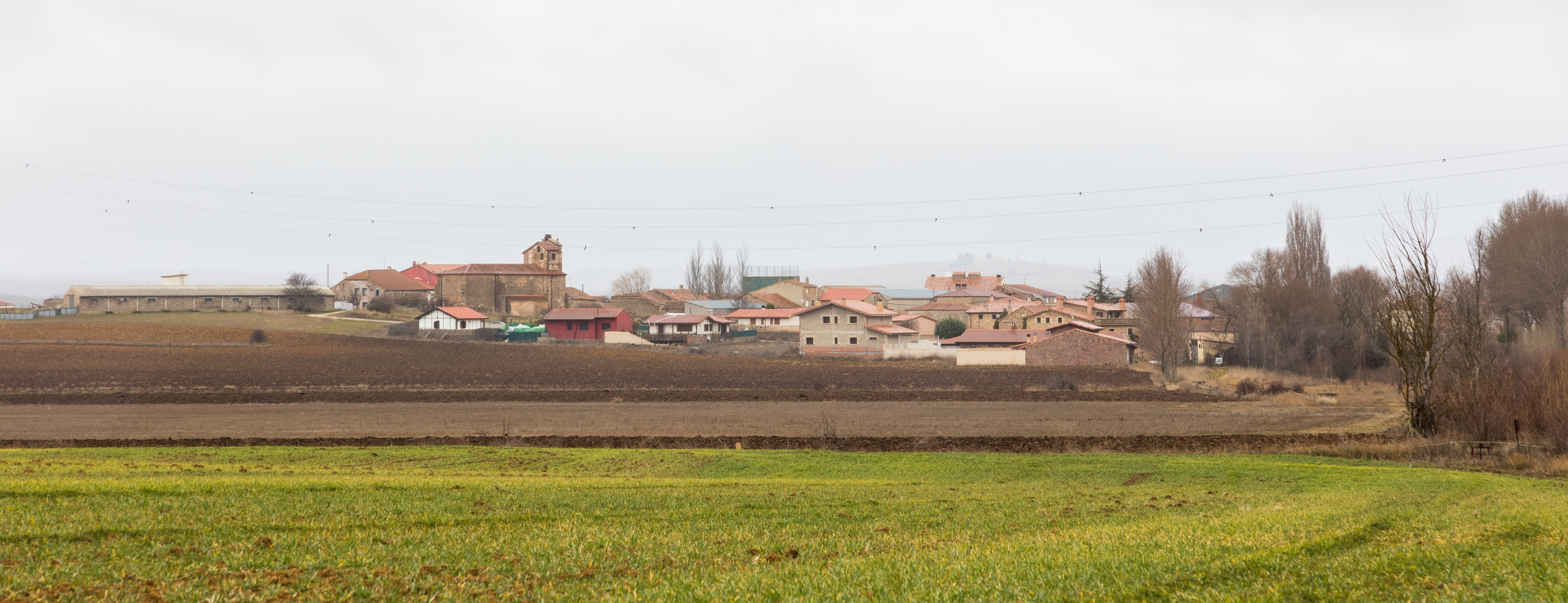
- General view in 2016

- Location in Spain. Buitrago (Spain)
- Country: Spain
- Autonomous community: Castile and León
- Province: Soria
- Municipality: Buitrago

Area
  - Total: 5.15 km^{2} (1.99 sq mi)
- Elevation: 1,032 m (3,386 ft)

Population (2025-01-01)
  - Total: 68
  - Density: 13/km^{2} (34/sq mi)
- Time zone: UTC+1 (CET)
  - Summer (DST): UTC+2 (CEST)
- Website: Official website

Buitrago is a municipality located in the province of Soria, Soria, Spain. According to the 2004 census (INE), the municipality had a population of 55 inhabitants.

Historically, a Jewish community was present in Buitrago. Its first written documentation was in 1290, and in 1492, when the Jews were expelled, most fled to North Africa or Portugal.
