= Cosa, Aragon =

Cosa, Spain
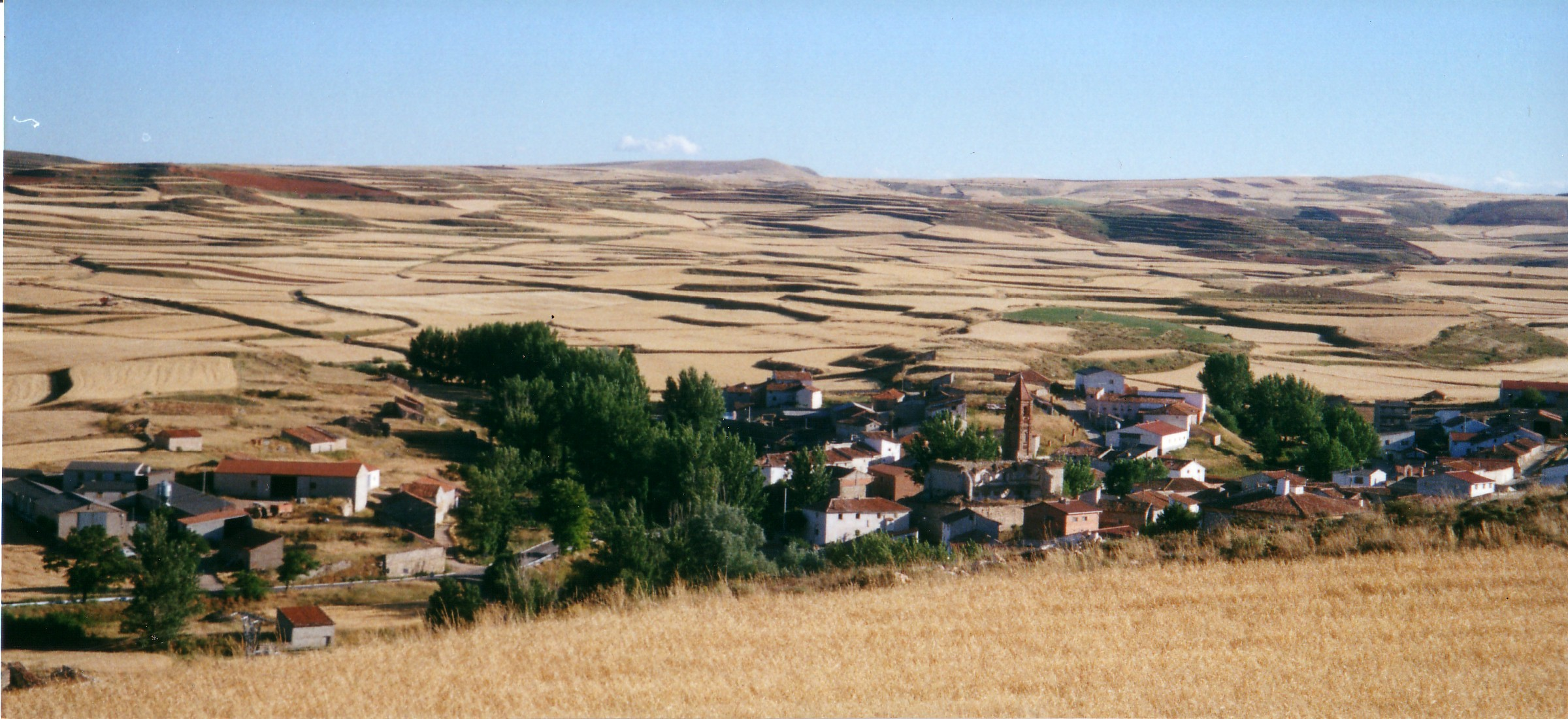

- Location within Spain
- Coordinates: 40°50′N 1°8′W
- Country: Spain
- Autonomous community: Aragon
- Province: Teruel
- Comarca: Jiloca

Area
  - Total: 54.8 km^{2} (21.2 sq mi)
- Elevation: 1,185 m (3,888 ft)

Population (2025-01-01)
  - Total: 63
  - Density: 1.1/km^{2} (3.0/sq mi)
- Time zone: UTC+1 (CET)
  - Summer (DST): UTC+2 (CEST)

Cosa is a municipality located in the province of Teruel, Aragon, Spain. According to the 2006 census (INE), the municipality has a population of 87 inhabitants.

== See also ==
- List of municipalities in Teruel
