= Aldehuela =

Aldehuela may refer to:

== Places in Spain ==
- La Aldehuela, municipality in the province of Ávila Castile and León
- Las Aldehuelas, municipality in the province of Soria, Castile and León
- Aldehuela de Periáñez, municipality in the province of Soria
- Aldehuela del Codonal, municipality in the province of Segovia, Castile and León
- Aldehuela de Jerte, municipality in the province of Cáceres, Extremadura
- Aldehuela de Liestos, municipality in the province of Zaragoza, Aragon
- Aldehuela de Yeltes, municipality in the province of Salamanca, Castile and León
- Aldehuela de la Bóveda, municipality in the province of Salamanca
- Castle of Aldehuela, between Jaén and Torredelcampo, Jaén

== People ==
- Martín de Aldehuela (1729–1802), Spanish architect
