= Álvaro de Zúñiga y Pérez de Guzmán =

Spanish Nobleman (1460-1531)

Álvaro II de Zúñiga y Guzmán
- 2nd Duke of Plasencia; 3rd Count of Bañares; 2nd Duke of Béjar; 1st Marquis of Gibraleón; Grandee; First Knight of the Realm; Knight of the Order of the Golden Fleece; Justicia Mayor of Castile; Alguacil Mayor (bailiwick) of Castile; State Councilor
- Coat of arms of the Duchy of Béjar
- Born: c. 1460; Seville, Kingdom of Castile
- Died: September 28, 1531 (aged 71); Béjar, Spain
- Father: Pedro de Zúñiga y Manrique de Lara
- Mother: Teresa de Guzmán

Álvaro de Zúñiga y Pérez de Guzmán (c. 1460 – September 28, 1531) was a Spanish nobleman, member of the first-born branch of the House of Zúñiga, Grandee of Spain, 2nd Duke of Béjar, 2nd Duke of Plasencia, 3rd Count of Bañares, 1st Marquis of Gibraleón, first knight of the realm, knight of the Order of the Golden Fleece, justicia mayor and alguacil mayor of Castile. In 1488 he succeeded his grandfather Álvaro de Zúñiga y Guzmán, 1st Duke of Béjar and Plasencia in the mayorazgo (majorat).

Among his military achievements is his participation with his banner and host in the Granada War from 1482 until the surrender of the city in 1492, and his role in defeating the Revolt of the Comuneros in 1520. He was the state councilor to the emperor of the Holy Roman Empire Charles V, I of Spain.

== Affiliation ==
Álvaro de Zúñiga y Pérez de Guzmán was the son of Pedro de Zúñiga y Manrique de Lara, 2nd Count of Bañares and 1st Count of Ayamonte, and Teresa de Guzmán (daughter of Juan Alonso Pérez de Guzmán y Suárez de Figueroa, 3rd Count of Niebla, 1st Duke of Medina Sidonia and Elvira de Guzmán).

In 1489 he married María de Zúñiga y Pimentel, half-sister of his father and daughter of Álvaro de Zúñiga y Guzmán and his second wife Leonor de Pimentel y Zúñiga. Pope Innocent VIII granted him the necessary authorization for consanguineous marriage in 1487.
He had no children with his legitimate wife, so the first male line of the dukes of Béjar and Plasencia was interrupted, titles that were to be inherited by his niece Teresa de Zúñiga y Manrique de Castro, daughter of his brother Francisco, 1st Marquis of Ayamonte and his wife Leonor Manrique de Castro.

Zúñiga had two children with Catalina de Orantes, Pedro and Isabel, whom he legitimized. Pedro was granted the lordship of Aldehuela and Isabel married Gonzalo de Guzmán y Quiñones, lord of Torla.

== Justicia mayor and alguacil mayor of Castile ==
The Catholic Monarchs granted Zúñiga one of the three alcaidarias-mor of Seville on December 21, 1486, and on the following December 31, they confirmed his position of justicia mayor and alguacil mayor of Castile, previously held by his father, grandfather, great-grandfather, and great-great-grandfather.

== Loss of Plasencia due to rebellion encouraged by the Catholic Monarchs ==
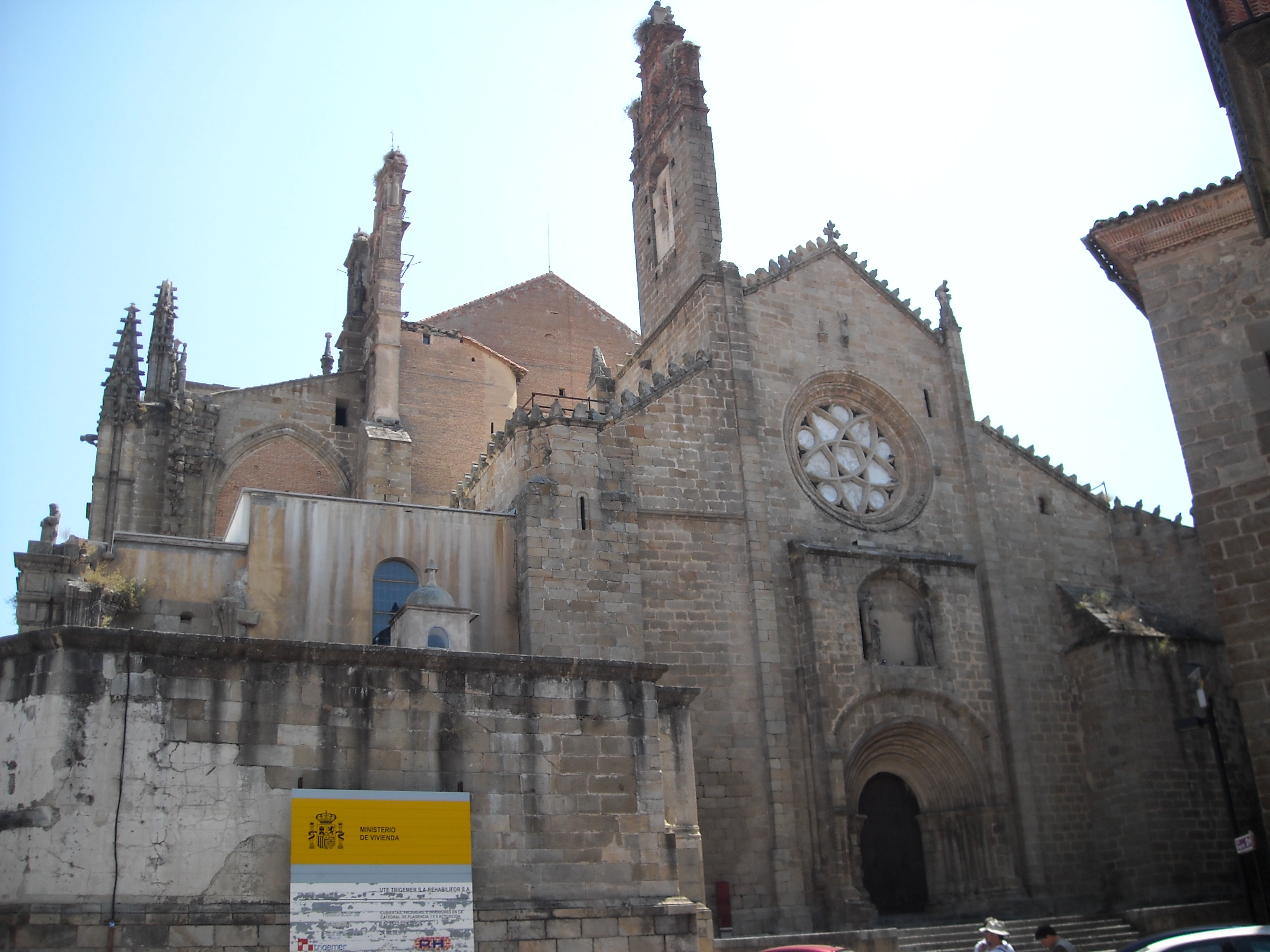
Old Cathedral of Plasencia

With the death of his grandfather, Zúñiga inherited, according to the will of July 21, 1486, five titles, lordships, and properties. His uncle Diego de Zúñiga y Manrique de Lara, prior of San Marcos (of the Order of Santiago in León), Lord of Víllora, second son of Álvaro I de Zúñiga, claimed the inheritance and called himself duke of Béjar. His uncle Francisco de Zúñiga y Manrique de Lara, Lord of Mirabel, also disagreed with the inheritance. Queen Isabella saw this circumstance as an opportunity to diminish the Zúñiga estate, which she considered excessive, and encouraged some important personalities of Plasencia to disassociate themselves from obedience to the new duke of Plasencia, subjugating themselves to the royal crown and giving them license to take up arms against their lord.

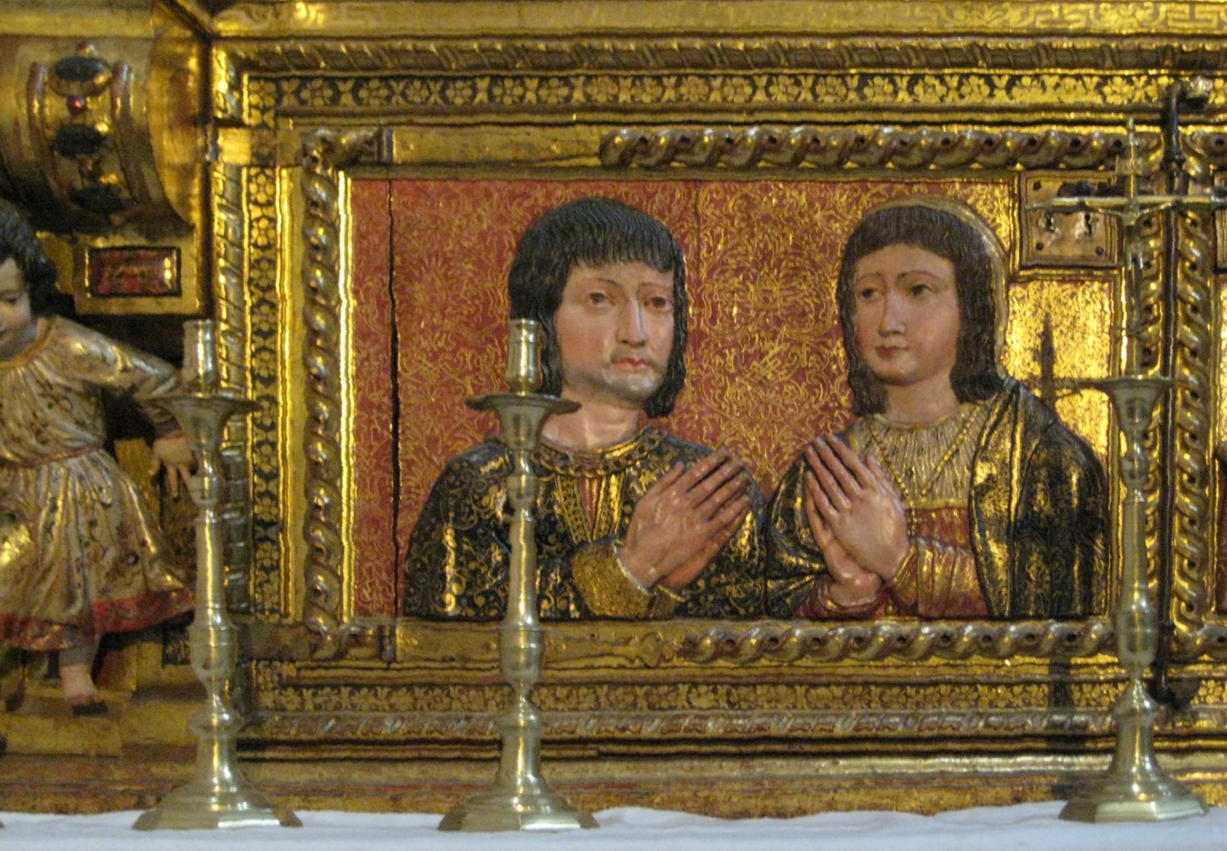
Image of the Catholic Monarchs Ferdinand and Isabella in their tomb in the Granada Cathedral.

Zúñiga went to Valladolide to try to solve the problem of his grandfather's succession with the Carvajals, Francisco de Carvajal, Lord of Torrejón, and his brother Gutierre (who during the past had been responsible for incidents). With the support of allies, they promoted an uprising in Plasencia in mid-1488, claiming the liberation of the municipality, setting up a siege of the castle and calling on King Ferdinand II to hand it over to Zuñiga. The population also revolted and supported the siege. Zúñiga tried unsuccessfully to enlist the help of Queen Isabella and King Ferdinand encouraged the rebels in their fight against the duke and, aided by his army, had Plasencia handed over to the Catholic Monarchs. Ferdinand II entered the city on October 20, 1488, and took the oath in the Old Cathedral of Plasencia, incorporating the city into the crown of Castile and freeing it from the fief of the Zúñiga. As present in Ferdinand II's oath upon taking the city, he promises to defend the municipality and residents of Plasencia in their forals, privileges, mercies, liberties, franchises, ordinances, uses, and customs, as Count Pedro de Zúñiga and his son Álvaro had done. The change of lordship to the Crown was therefore not due to injustices committed by their dukes but to the will of the Catholic Monarchs, who acted in disregard of the pacts established by them with his grandfather, the 1st Duke of Plasencia, in 1476 and 1480. The city and valleys of Plasencia had been granted to the 1st Count of Plasencia, Pedro de Estúñiga, in 1441 by the King of Castile and Leon John II. Years later, on February 23, 1495, the city of Plasencia petitioned the Catholic Monarchs to confirm the franchises, liberties, and exemptions that the townspeople had when they had the dukes of Álvaro and his grandson as their lord.

== Participation with banner and host in the Granada War ==
Zúñiga took part in the Granada War from 1482 until the surrender of the city in 1492, with the banner and host of his grandfather and his father. He was one of the most distinguished knights in the service of the Catholic Monarchs in that war. In June 1482, King Ferdinand II began the conquest of Granada by focusing on the united armies of the great ones of Castile in Córdoba and marching towards Loja.

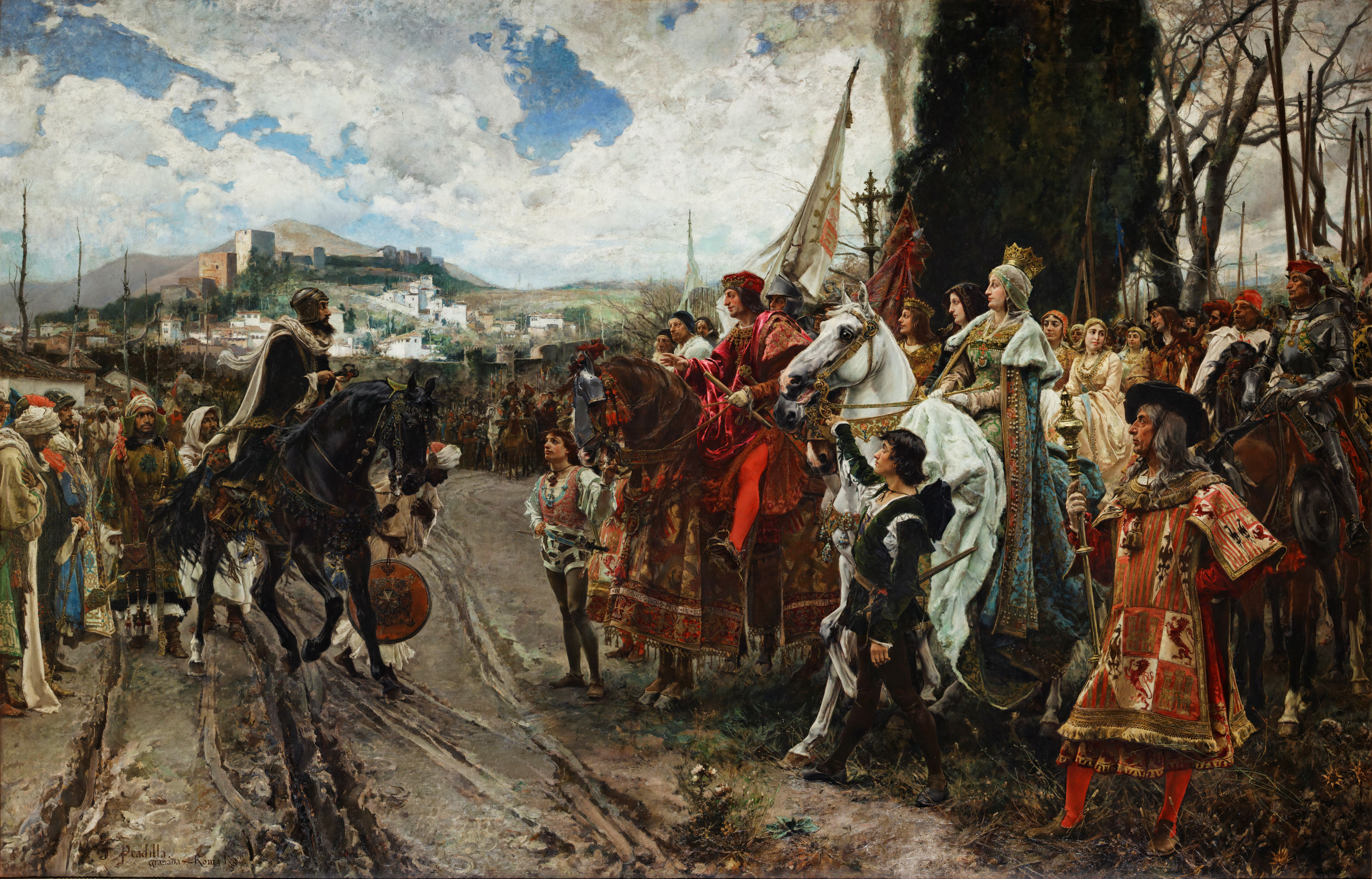
The Surrender of Granada, by Francisco Pradilla, representing the encounter of the Catholic Monarchs with Boabdil, the last Moorish king of Granada

On July 4, 1482, a bloody fight was fought with the Moorish army led by Ali-Atar, the commander of the fortress of Loja. The Marquis of Cádiz, Rodrigo Ponce de León almost lost his life while saving Ferdinand II, who was fighting among the Moors - his horse was wounded just as his lance was piercing the body of a Moor. The constable of Castile, 2nd Count of Haro, Pedro Fernández de Velasco, received three wounds in the face. The 2nd Duke of Medina-Sidonia, Enrique Pérez de Guzmán, fell from his horse. The 2nd Count of Tendilla, Íñigo López de Mendoza, received violent blows of club and almost fell into enemy hands, being saved from such fate by the young Zúñiga.

Zúñiga's uncles Juan de Zúñiga y Pimentel, Master of the Order of Alcántara, and Francisco de Zúñiga y Manrique de Lara also participated in the conquest of Loja in 1484. King Ferdinand II, the dukes of Nájera, Medinaceli, and of Plasencia (the latter represented by his grandson Álvaro), and other nobles concentrated their forces in Córdoba in April 1485 to wage war on the Moors. Zúñiga leads the duke of Plasencia's host, consisting of approximately 220 lances. In the spring of 1485, they entered Ronda, which they conquered on May 10. The united armies then advanced towards Málaga and participated in the siege and taking of Vélez-Málaga, which they capitulated on September 4, 1487. Zúñiga also participated in the conquest of Baza, Guadix, and Almeria, and in the final victory of the War of Granada, which ended with the surrender of the Moorish king Boabdil.

The documents of capitulation and the surrender of Granada (Treaty of Granada) signed on December 30, 1491 were witnessed by Castilian nobles, among whom was Zúñiga, Duke of Béjar. These documents confirm the agreements on the Veiga de Granada, on November 25 of the same year, between the Catholic Monarchs and the Moorish alcaldeans Yusuf ibn Comixa and Abu-Casim al Muley (on behalf of Boabdil, the king of Granada). Zúñiga is also among the witnesses to the ceremony of the handover of the city of Granada, on January 2, 1492.

== Conjuring of the "Grandees of Castile" against Ferdinand II's government ==
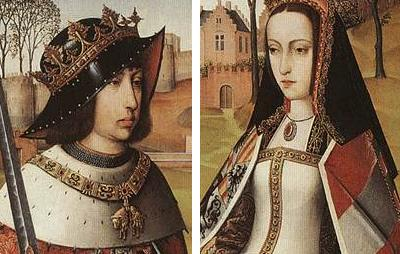
Joana, "The Mad" and her husband Philip I.

After the death of Queen Isabella I, which occurred on November 26, 1504, her widower Ferdinand II convenes the Cortes de Toro on behalf of his absent daughter, the titular queen Joanna "The Mad". 83 laws are agreed upon on March 7, 1505, regulating the succession and recognizing the King of Aragon Ferdinand II as governor of the Kingdom of Castile following the will of Queen Isabella. The grandees of Castile conjured against Ferdinand II, knowing that Isabella's will ordered that only in the event of Joanna's impediment should Ferdinand be governor.

The Conjuring was initiated in 1505 by Juan Manuel, Lord of Belmonte, and was joined by the dukes of Nájera, Béjar, Medina-Sidonia, the count of Benavente, and the marquis of Villena, who did not recognize the agreement of the Cortes de Toro nor Fernando II's rule of the kingdom. They intend to rid themselves of Ferdinand's authoritarian rule and they invited Philip, Count of Burgundy, to rule Castile on behalf of his wife Joanna. Philip develops intense diplomatic activity in Castile, addressing letters to the grandees (most powerful nobles), to high ecclesiastical dignitaries, and to main cities and towns with votes in the courts. Such letter is a letter of thanks sent to the 2nd duke of Béjar on February 15, 1505. However, King Philip died shortly after in Burgos on September 25, 1506. Ferdinand II would not die until January 1516.

== Knight of the Order of the Golden Fleece ==
Zúñiga was part of the chapter of the Order of the Golden Fleece celebrated in the cathedral of Barcelona from March 2 to 4, 1519 (in the cathedral choir the escutcheon of the knights who participated in that chapter are still preserved on the upper part of the seats), where he was elected and invested knight of the order by the Emperor of the Holy Roman Empire Charles V (I of Spain), master and sovereign of the order.

== Grande de España ==
As "Grandee of Castile," Zúñiga was granted the title "Grandee of Spain," created by Emperor Charles V after he went to Spain on his return from the coronation in 1520 in Germany.

== At the service of Charles V ==
Zúñiga presided over the entourage that in January 1524 took the Infanta Catharine of Austria, younger sister of Emperor Charles V and future wife of King John III of Portugal, to the Portuguese border in Badajoz. Also part of this entourage was Friar Diego López Toledo, comendador of Herrera, Juan Alonso de Guzmán y Zúñiga, 8th Count of Niebla, 6th Duke of Medina Sidonia, and his nephew Francisco de Sotomayor, 5th Count of Belalcázar.

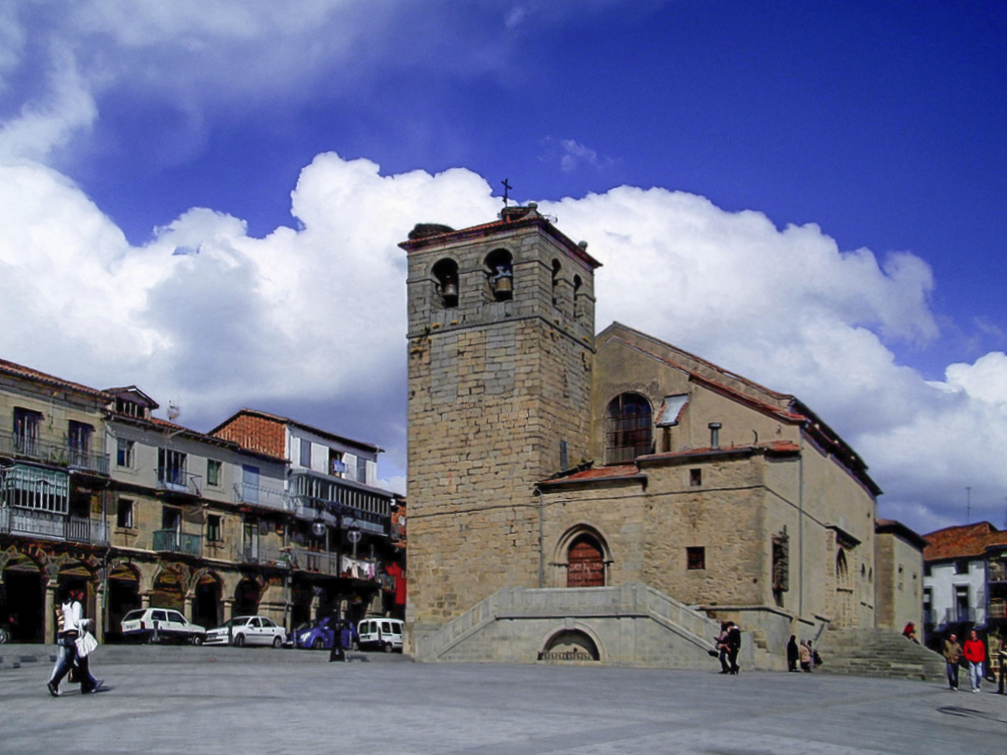
Church of the Savior in Béjar

In 1526, he received the title of marquis of Gibraleón. On February 7, 1526, he participated in the entourage that received Princess Isabella of Portugal, future wife of Charles V, on the border between Elvas and Badajoz. Were also part of this entourage the duke of Calabria, the Archbishop of Toledo, Alonso de Zúñiga y Acevedo, the 3rd count of Monterrey, and the count of Cifuentes.

Zúñiga was appointed member of the first council of state created by the emperor during his stay in Granada in the summer of 1526. In this council were: Mercurio de Gattinara, Henrique de Nassau-Dillenburg, Fadrique Alvarez de Toledo y Enríquez, 2nd Duke of Alba, Alonso III de Fonseca, Archbishop of Toledo, García de Loaysa, Bishop of Osma and confessor to the emperor, and Alonso Merino, Bishop of Jaén.

Charles V and Empress Elisabeth named Zúñiga godfather of Prince Philip II; the godmother was to be the widowed Queen Leonor, sister of Charles V. The baptism took place on June 5, 1527, in St. Paul's Church in Valladolid, by the Archbishop of Toledo, when Philip was three months old. At the time Zúñiga was limping due to a leg wound suffered during the Granada War.

Zúñiga died in Béjar on September 28, 1531.

== Bibliography ==
- "AER - Pares, Portal de Archivos Españoles". Ministry of Culture of Spain.
- Arco y Molinero, Ángel del (1899). Glorias de la Nobleza Española (in Spanish). Madrid.
- Atienza, Julio (1959). Nobiliario Español (in Spanish). Madrid: Editorial Aguilar.
- Carrillo, Alonso (1657). Origen de la Dignidad de Grande de Castilla (in Spanish). Madrid: Imprensa Real.
- Ceballos-Escalera y Gila, Alfonso de Marqués de la Floresta (2000). La Insigne Orden del Toisón de Oro (in Spanish). Madrid: Fundación Carlos III, Palafox & Pezuela. ISBN 84-930310-2-X.
- Fernández, Fray Alonso (2006). Historia y Anales de la Ciudad y Obispado de Plasencia (fac-símile of the original from 1627) (in Spanish). Badajoz: Cicon Ediciones. ISBN 84-95371-20-0.
- Menéndez y Pidal, Ramón (1983). "2". Historia de España (in Spanish). Madrid: Editorial Espasa-Calpe. ISBN 84-239-4819-6.
- Menéndez y Pidal, Ramón (1999). Historia de España. Tomo XX - La España de Carlos V: el hombre, la política española, la política europea (in Spanish). Madrid: Editorial Espasa-Calpe SA. ISBN 978-84-239-4828-4.
- Ortiz de Zúñiga, Diego (1677). Annales Eclesiásticos y Seculares de la muy Noble y muy Leal Ciudad de Sevilla, Metrópoli de Andaluzía,... desde el año de 1246 ... hasta el de 1671 ... (in Spanish). Madrid: Imprenta Real.
- Pfandl, Ludwig (1973). Philipp II: Gemälde eines Lebens und einer Zeit (in German). Callwey. ISBN 9783766700575.
- Prescott, William Hickling; McJoynt, Albert D. (1995). The art of war in Spain: the conquest of Granada, 1481-1492. Greenhill Books. ISBN 9781853671937.
- Sánchez Loro, Domingos (1959). El Parecer de un Deán (Don Diego de Jerez, Consejero de los Reyes Católicos, Servidor de los Duques de Plasencia, Deán y Protonotario de su Iglesia Catedral) (in Spanish). Cáceres: Biblioteca Extremeña, Publicaciones del Movimiento edición, Typography, El Noticiero.
- Vilar y Pascual, Luis (1864). Diccionario Histórico Genealógico y Heráldico de las Familias Ilustres de la Monarquía Española (in Spanish). Madrid.

Preceded by Álvaro de Zúñiga y Guzmán	Dukedom of Béjar; 1488–1531	Succeeded by Teresa de Zúñiga y Manrique de Lara
Preceded by Álvaro de Zúñiga y Guzmán	Dukedom of Plasencia; 1488–1531	Succeeded by Teresa de Zúñiga y Manrique de Lara
Preceded by Pedro de Zúñiga y Manrique de Lara	County of Bañares; 1484–1531	Succeeded by Teresa de Zúñiga y Manrique de Lara
Preceded by Newly created title	Marquessate of Gibraleón; 1426–1531	Succeeded by Teresa de Zúñiga y Manrique de Lara
