= Ordesa Valley =

Valley in Sobrarbe, Spain

Coordinates: 42°38′55″N 0°03′29″W

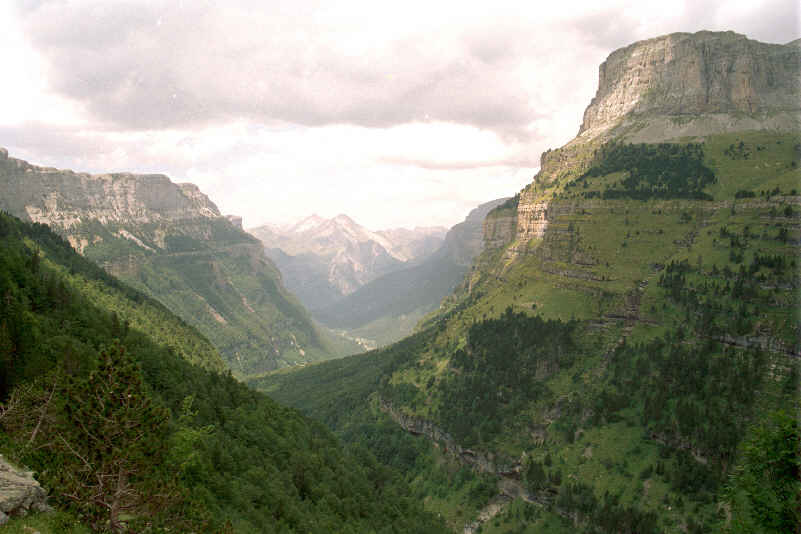
The Ordesa Valley

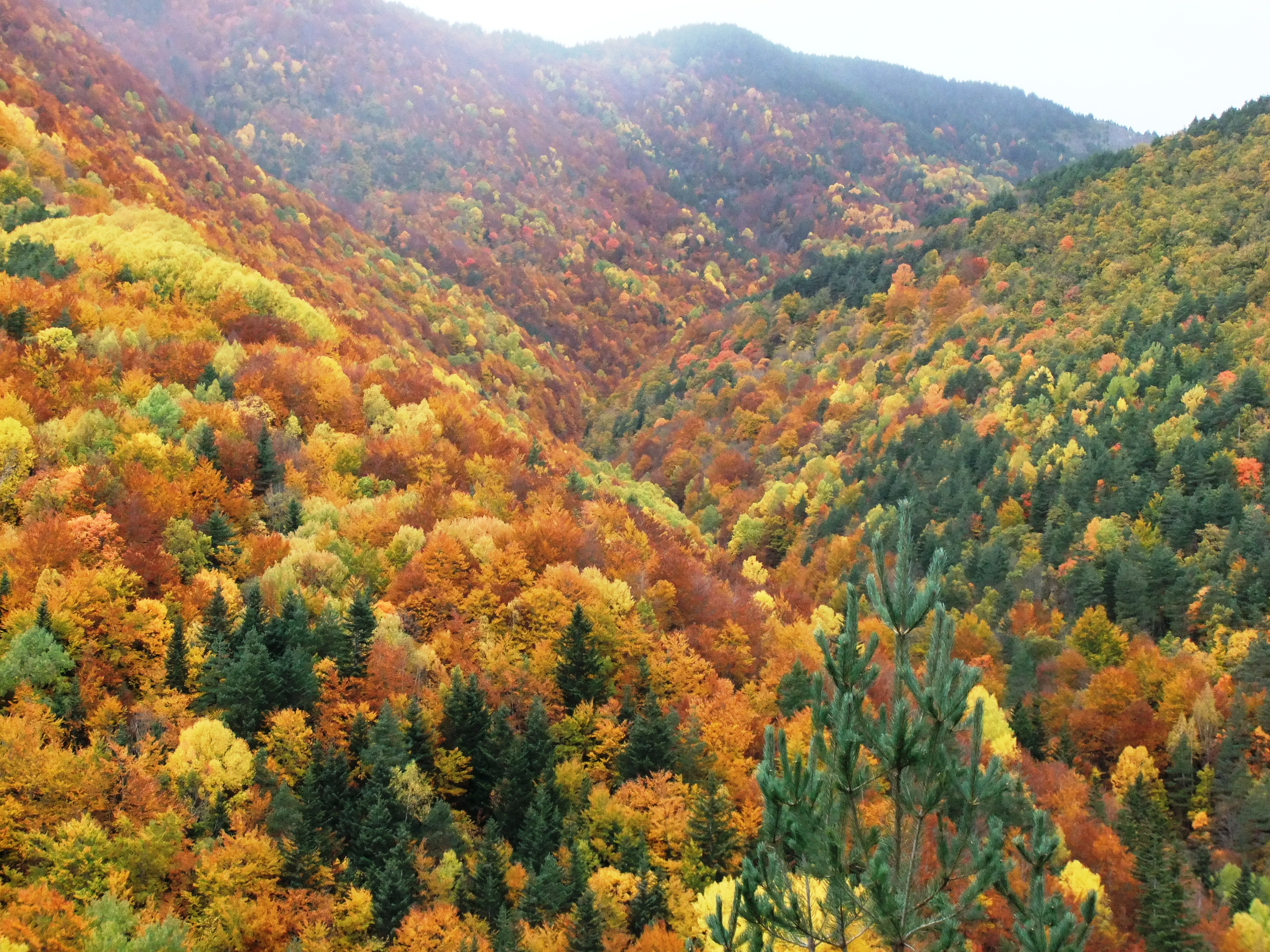
Bosque de La Pardina del Señor, between Fanlo and Sarvisé, in autumn.

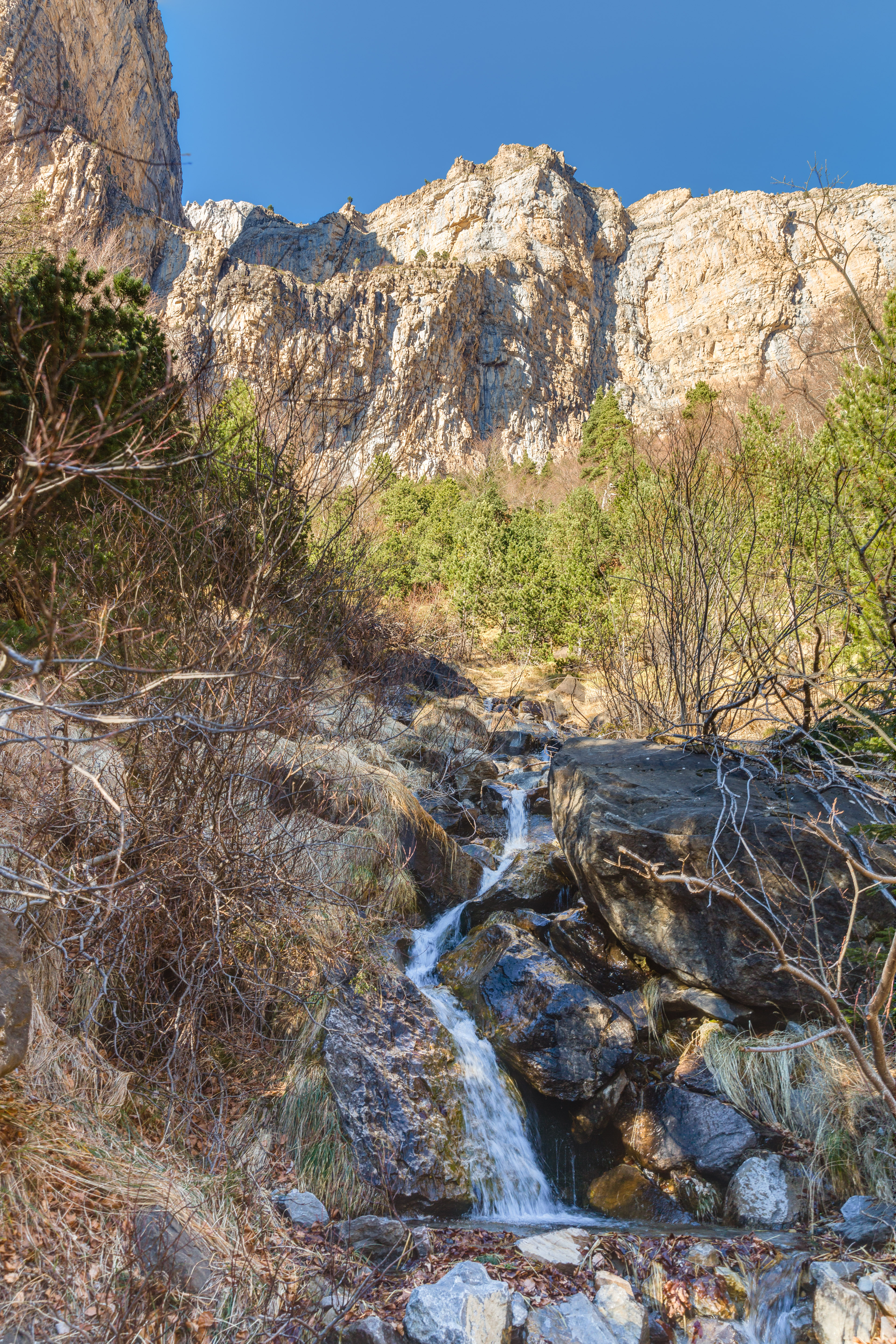
River in Cotatuero

The Ordesa Valley is a glacial valley in Aragon, in the Spanish Pyrenees which forms part of the Ordesa y Monte Perdido National Park. It was first discovered in 1820, but not mapped in detail until approximately the 1920s. The valley is about 11 kilometres (7 mi) long.

The valley's east–west orientation, unusual in the Pyrenees, opens it to influence from the Atlantic Ocean and gives it a moderate climate. It has one of Europe's largest populations of the Pyrenean Chamois and is well known for its waterfalls and wildlife.

Monte Perdido (3,355 m) is the third highest mountain in the Pyrenees and together with Cilindro de Marboré (3,328 m) and Soum de Ramond (3,263 m) can be seen at the north-east end of the valley. The name Monte Perdido (lost mountain) was given because the peak could not be seen from the French side of the range.
