= Soum de Ramond =

Mountain in Northern Spain

Soum de Ramond / Pico de Añisclo
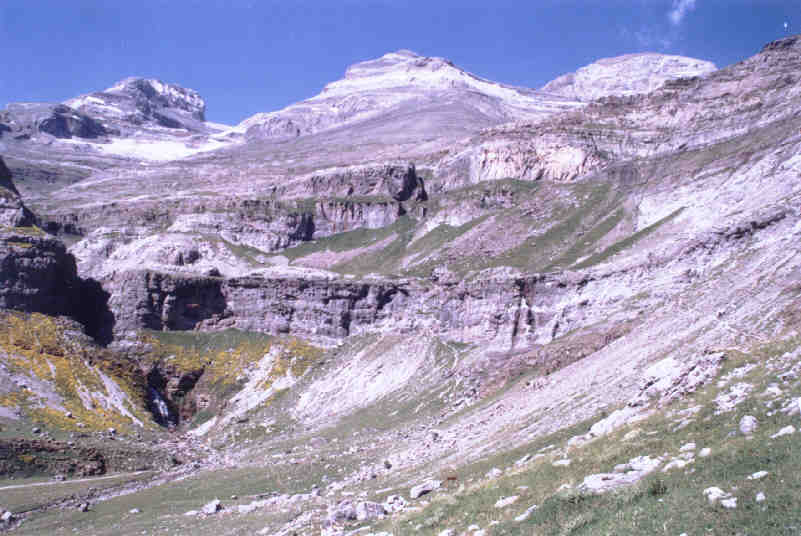
- Las Tres Sorores from the head of the Ordesa Valley. Cilindro de Marboré, Monte Perdido and Soum de Ramond (left to right)

Highest point
- Elevation: 3,263 m (10,705 ft)
- Listing: List of mountains in Aragon
- Coordinates: 42°40′14″N 0°02′30″E

Geography
- Location within Pyrenees
- Location: Huesca, Spain
- Parent range: Pyrenees

Geology
- Mountain type: Limestone

Climbing
- Easiest route: F, from the Añisclo col

Soum de Ramond, also known as Pico de Añisclo in Spanish and Aragonese, is a mountain of 3,263 metres in the Monte Perdido massif in the Aragonese Pyrenees in northern Spain. It is one of the three mountains comprising Las Tres Sorores, the others being Monte Perdido (3,355 m) and Cilindro de Marboré (3,328 m).

The mountain lies between the Ordesa Valley, the Añisclo Canyon and the Pineta Valley, inside the Ordesa y Monte Perdido National Park. The Aragonese name "Pico Anyisclo" originates from the eponymous valley in the Aragonese Pyrenees. Later on, the mountain was named "Soum de Ramond" after Louis Ramond de Carbonnières, the French politician, geologist and botanist.

== See also ==
- List of Pyrenean three-thousanders
