= Pic central =

Pic Central
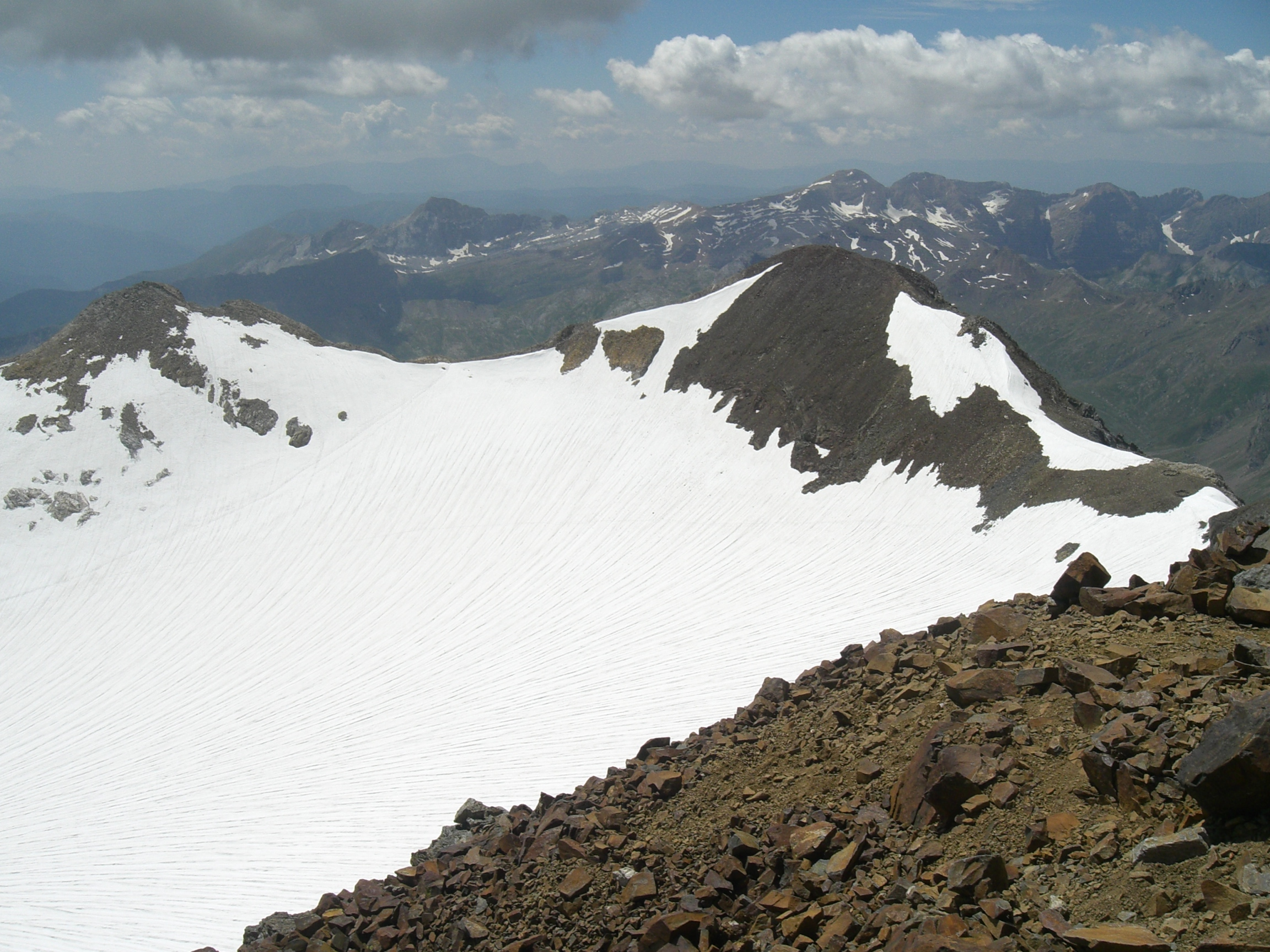
- Vue du pic Central (à gauche) et du pic de Cerbillona (à droite).

Highest point
- Elevation: 3,235 m (10,614 ft)
- Listing: List of Pyrenean three-thousanders
- Coordinates: 42°46′07″N 0°08′44″E

Geography
- Location within Pyrenees
- Location: France — Spain
- Région Communauté: Midi-Pyrénées; Aragon
- Département Province: Hautes-Pyrénées; Huesca
- Parent range: Massif du Vignemale (Pyrenees)

Climbing
- Easiest route: From Glacier d'Ossoue

The Pic Central is a pyrenean summit, culminating at 3,235 m (10,614 ft), located on the Franco-Spanish border in the massif du Vignemale, of which it constitutes the fourth highest peak.

== Topography ==
The French side is located in the Hautes-Pyrénées department, between Cauterets and Gavarnie, arrondissement of Argelès-Gazost in the Pyrenees National Park. The southern Spanish side is included in the « Reserva de la Biosfera Ordesa-Viñamala », in Torla territory, Huesca province.
