= Góriz =

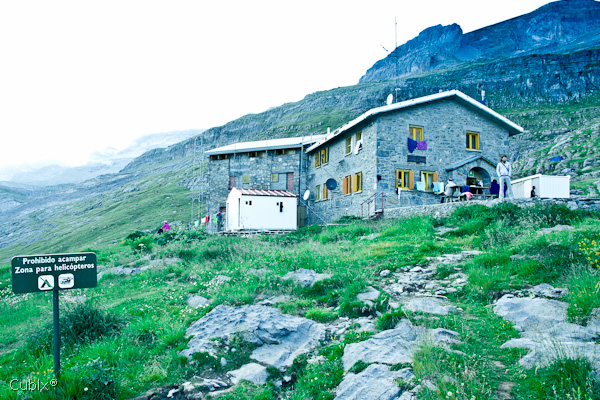
- Góriz
- Interactive map of the Góriz area

General information
- Coordinates: 42.6633°N 0.0150°E

Góriz or Refuge of Góriz is a mountain refuge located in the province of Huesca in the Spanish Pyrenees. The hut is a hub of different treks in the area, like GR 11 or Monte Perdido climb. It can host 72 people and is usually full in high season so it is necessary to book in advance.

== See also ==
- List of mountains in Aragon
- List of Pyrenean three-thousanders
