= Ordesa y Monte Perdido National Park =

National park and biosphere reserve in the Pyrenees in Spain

Ordesa and Monte Perdido National Park
- Parque Nacional de Ordesa y Monte Perdido
- IUCN category II (national park)
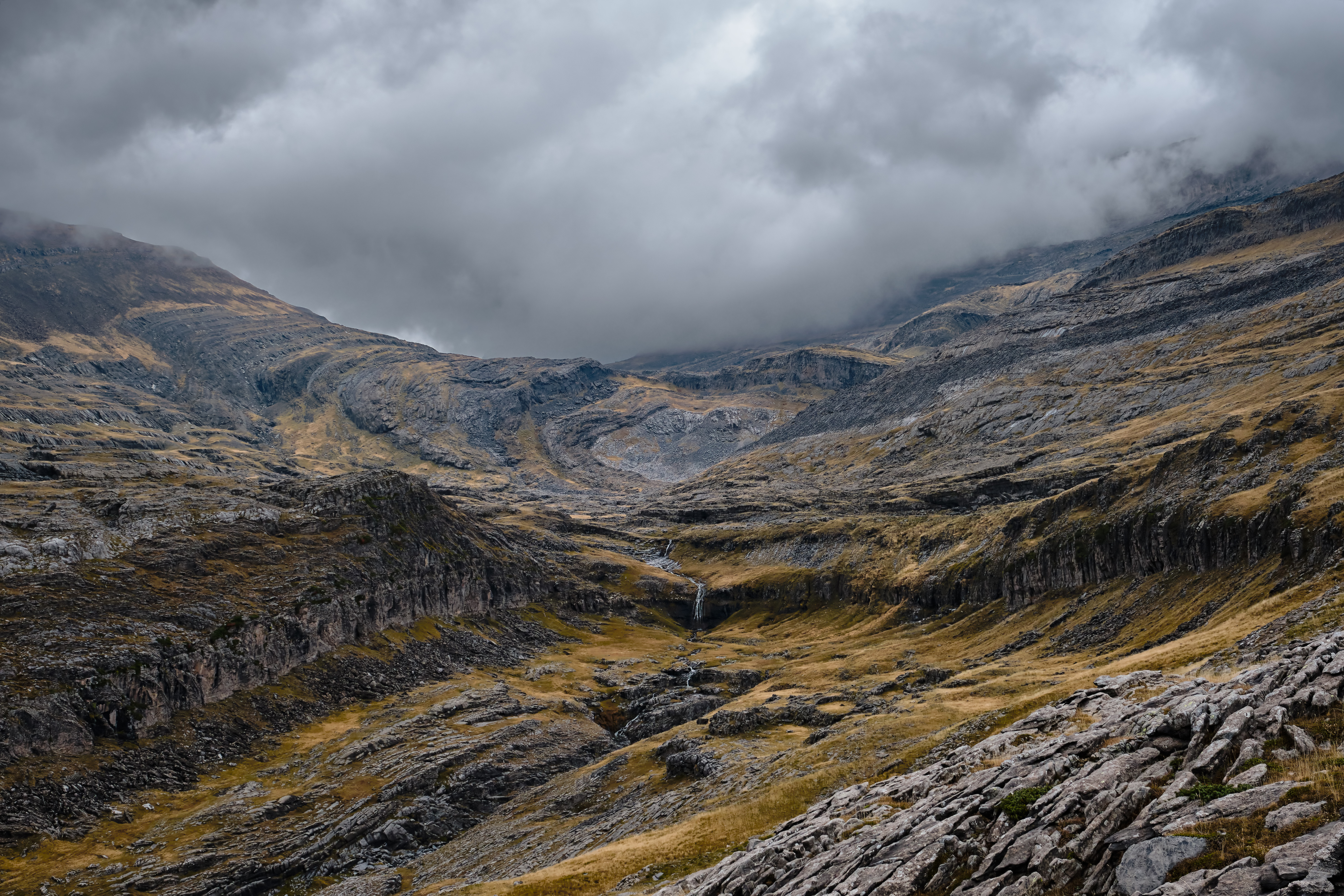
- Location of Ordesa y Monte Perdido
- Location: Pyrenees of Huesca, Spain
- Nearest city: Jaca
- Coordinates: 42°40′18″N 0°3′20″E
- Area: 156.08 km^{2} (60.26 sq mi)
- Established: 1918
- Governing body: National Parks Autonomous Agency

UNESCO World Heritage Site
- Type: Mixed
- Criteria: (iii), (iv), (v), (vii), (viii)
- Designated: 1997 (21st session)
- Part of: Pyrénées - Mont Perdu
- Reference no.: 773
- Region: Europe and North America
- Extensions: 1999

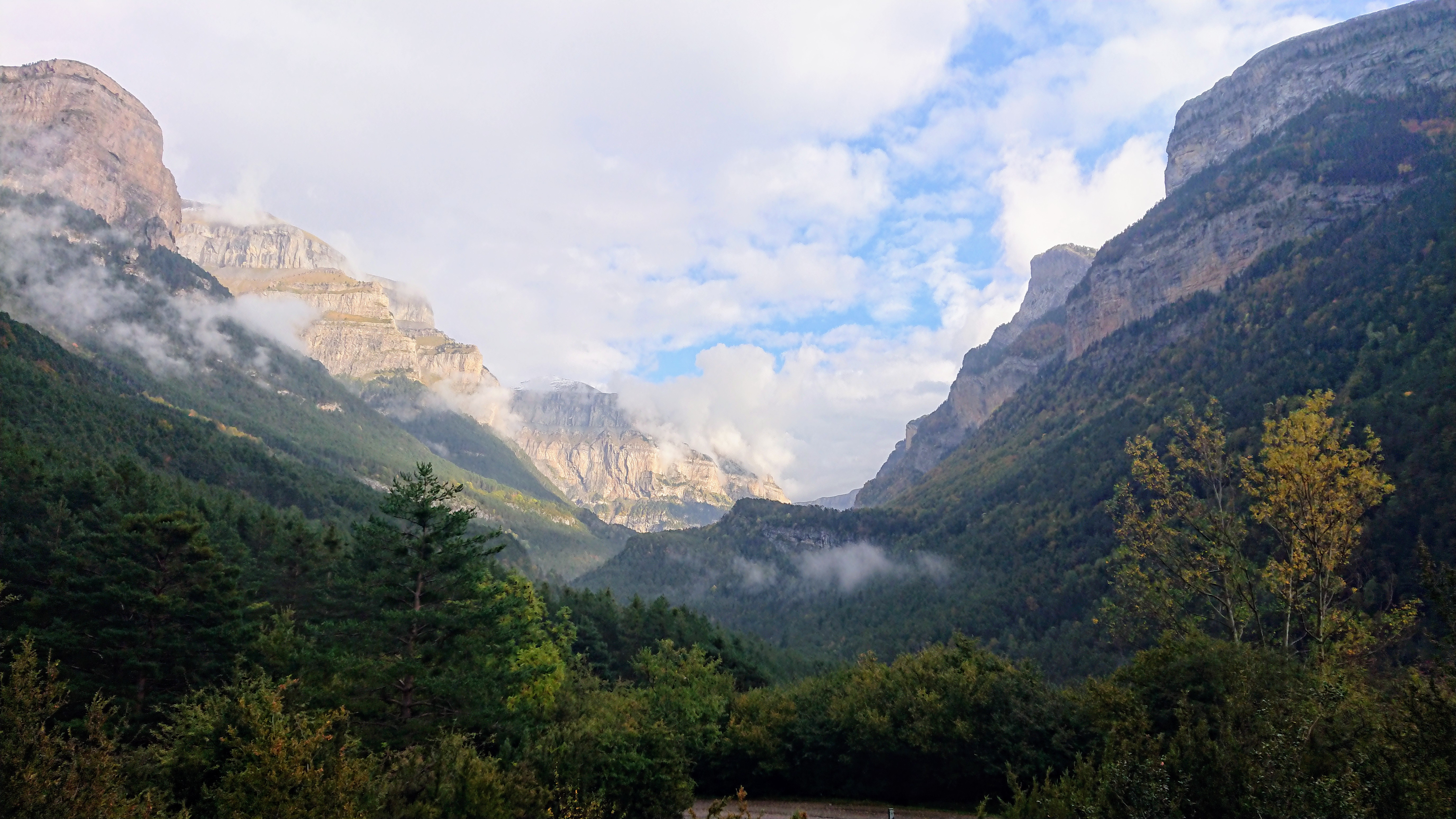
Ordesa Valley

Ordesa y Monte Perdido National Park (Parque nacional de Ordesa y Monte Perdido) is an IUCN Category II National Park situated in the Pyrenees. There has been a National Park in the Ordesa Valley since 1918. Its protected area was enlarged in 1982 to cover the whole region, amounting to 156.08 square kilometres.

It has been included since 1997 by UNESCO in the Biosphere Reserve of Ordesa-Viñamala. In the same year it was included in the cross-border Pyrénées - Mont Perdu World Heritage Site because of its spectacular geologic landforms.

== Geology ==
The national park was created to protect the high mountain topography of Monte Perdido and the Pyrenees. The region is dominated by limestone, with karst formations such as karren, sinkholes, and caves. The limestone originated from the Cretaceous and Eocene periods. Tectonic uplift has created deep canyons, and, during the Quaternary, repeated glaciations carved cirques and large U-shaped valleys.

== Climate ==
The climate is typically Pyrenean. The difference in altitude from 750 meters at the entrance of the Añisclo canyon to 3,355 meters at Monte Perdido, and the orientation of each valley, results in large variations in humidity and temperature between day and night. Thermal inversions that are reflected in the distribution of vegetation floors. There is a variable regime of valley and mountain winds.

== Flora ==
At elevations up to 1,000–1,700 meters, there are extensive forests of beeches (Fagus sylvatica), Abies alba, pines (Pinus sylvestris), oaks (Quercus subpyrenaica), and a lesser extent of birches (Betula pendula), ashes (Fraxinus excelsior), and willows (Salix angustifolia). At higher elevations up to 1,700 meters, the mountain pine (Pinus uncinata) dominates. From 700 to 1,800 meters, bushes of boxwood (Buxus sempervirens) are found. In the high meadows from 1,700 to 3,000 meters, there are numerous endemisms including Borderea pyrenaica, Campanula cochleariifolia, Ramonda myconi, Silene borderei, Androsace cylindrica, Pinguicula longifolia, Petrocoptis crassifolia, etc. The edelweiss (Leontopodium alpinum) is one of the symbols of the National Park.

== Fauna ==
The most important species of the Park was the bucardo or Pyrenean ibex, which went extinct in January 2000 in spite of preservation efforts. The Pyrenean chamois is a type of goat antelope. Other species include the alpine marmot, boar, and the Pyrenean desman or water-mole (Galemys pyrenaicus), as well as raptors like the golden eagle, the bearded vulture, the griffon vulture, hawks, and the Eurasian eagle-owl.

== Protected status ==
Many illustrious persons have been fond of the places in this region and have extolled their virtues. Luciano Briet, Soler i Santaló and Lucas Mallada y Pueyo helped promote the reputation of the region and obtain protected status for it.

An area of 21 square kilometres containing the Ordesa Valley was declared a National Park on 16 August 1918 by a Royal Decree. On 13 July 1982, it was enlarged to its current 156.08 square kilometres, and its official name was changed to Parque nacional de Ordesa y Monte Perdido.

== Gallery ==
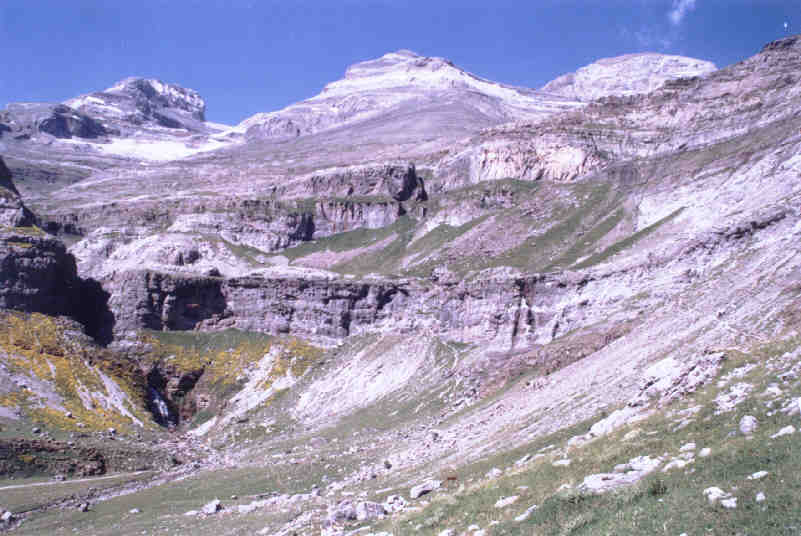
Cirque de Soaso, with Cilindro de Marboré, Monte Perdido and Soum de Ramond (left to right)

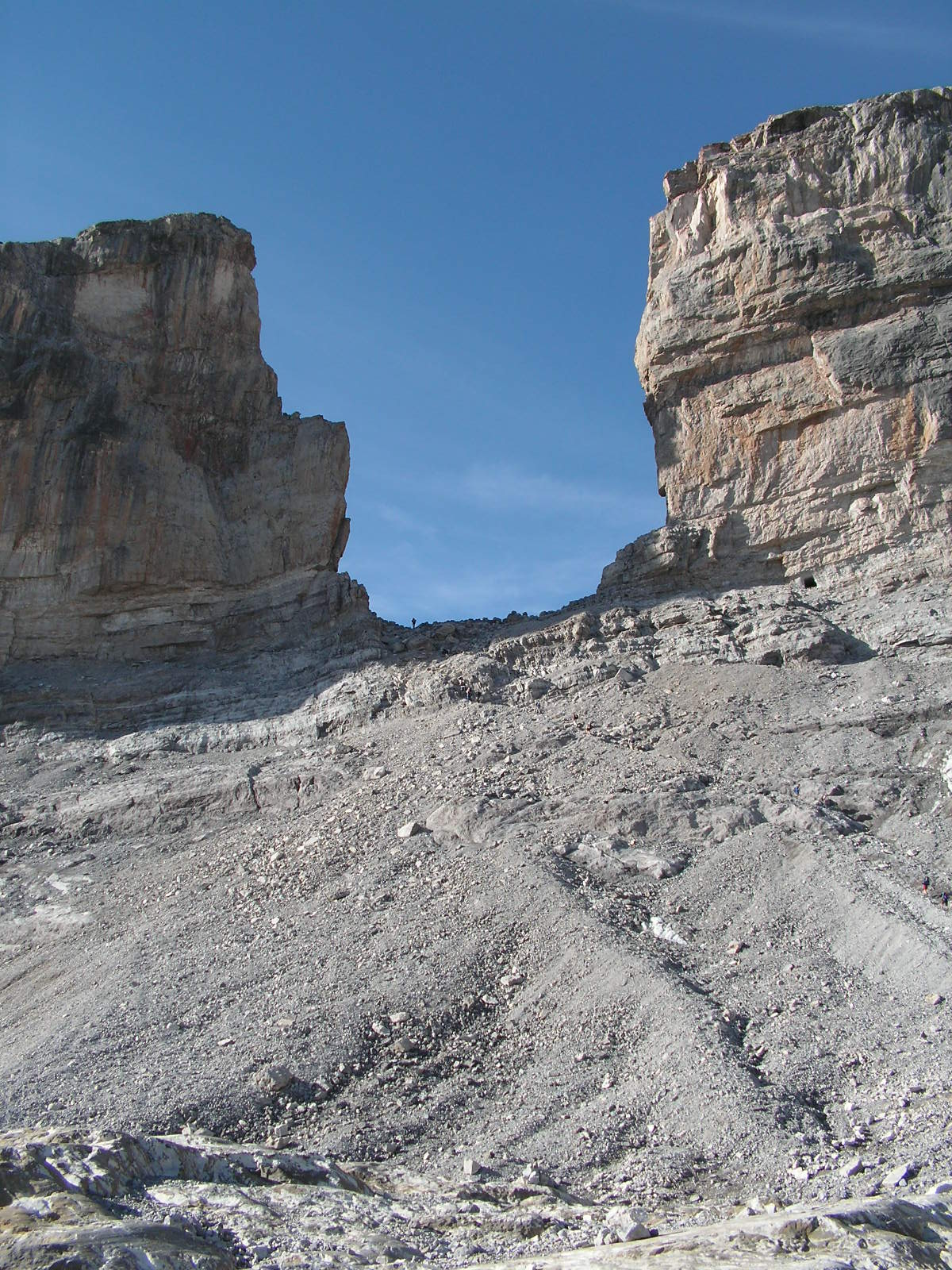
North face of La Brèche de Roland

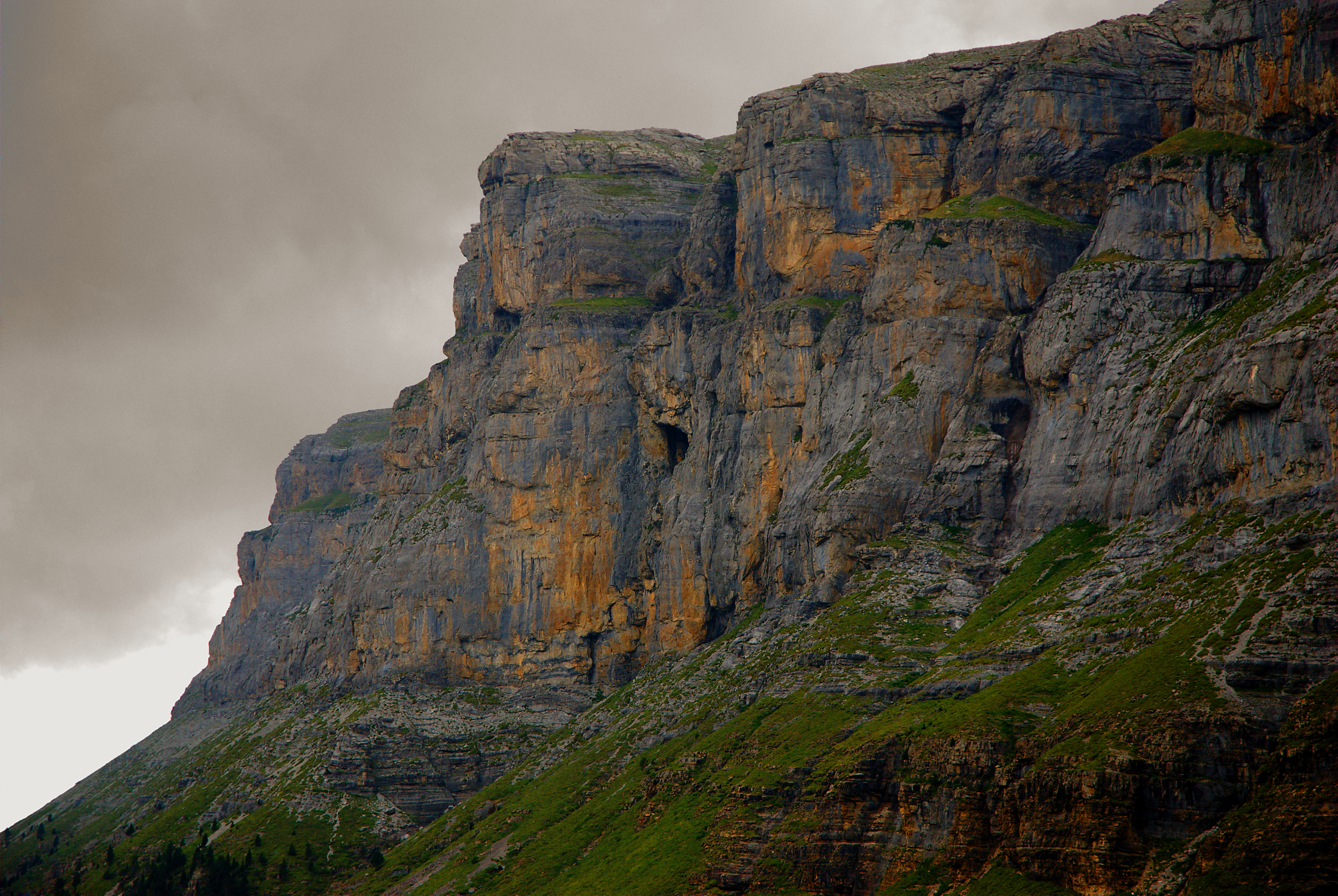
Northwest face of Cirque of Soaso

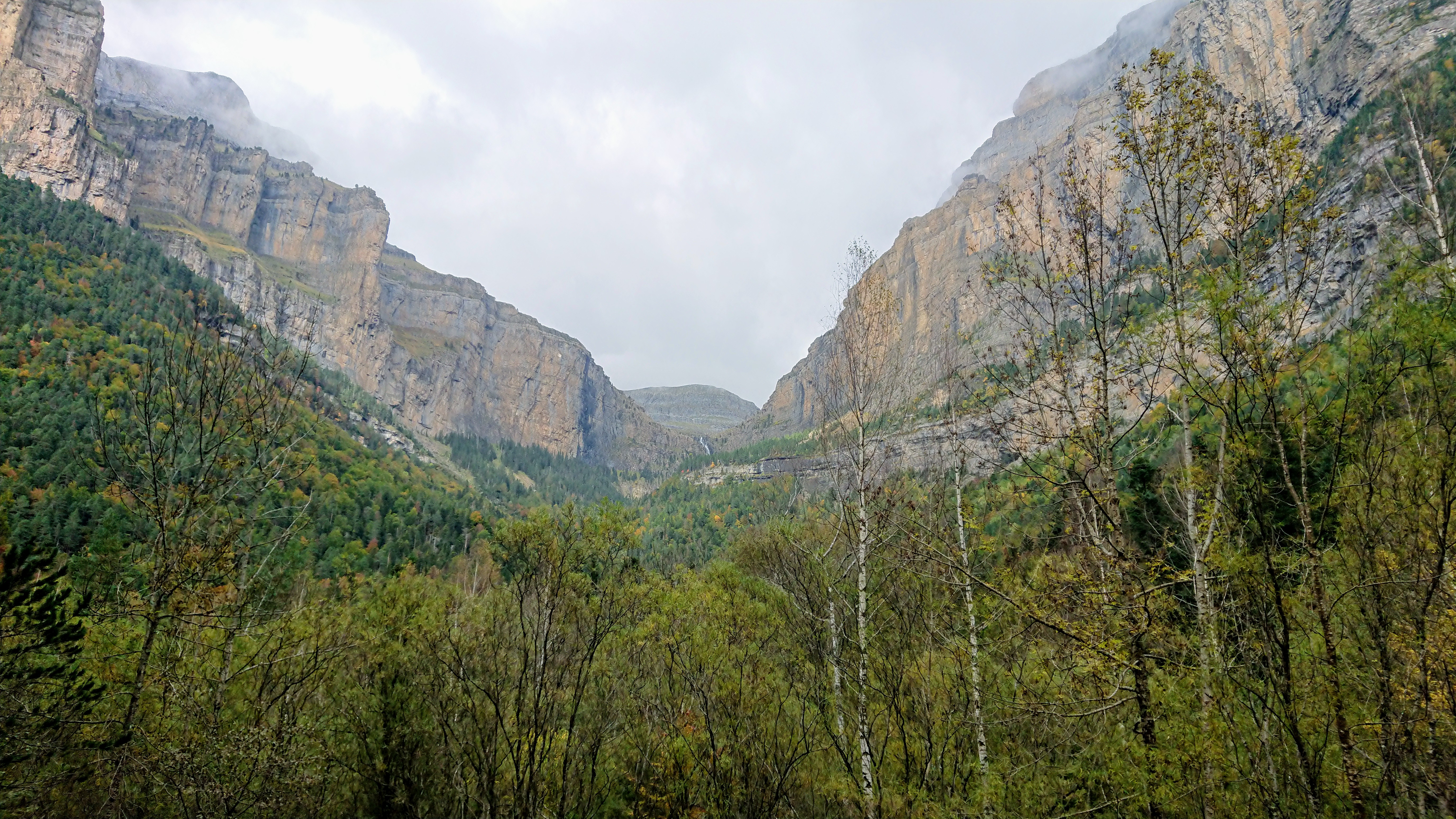
Cirque de Cotatuero

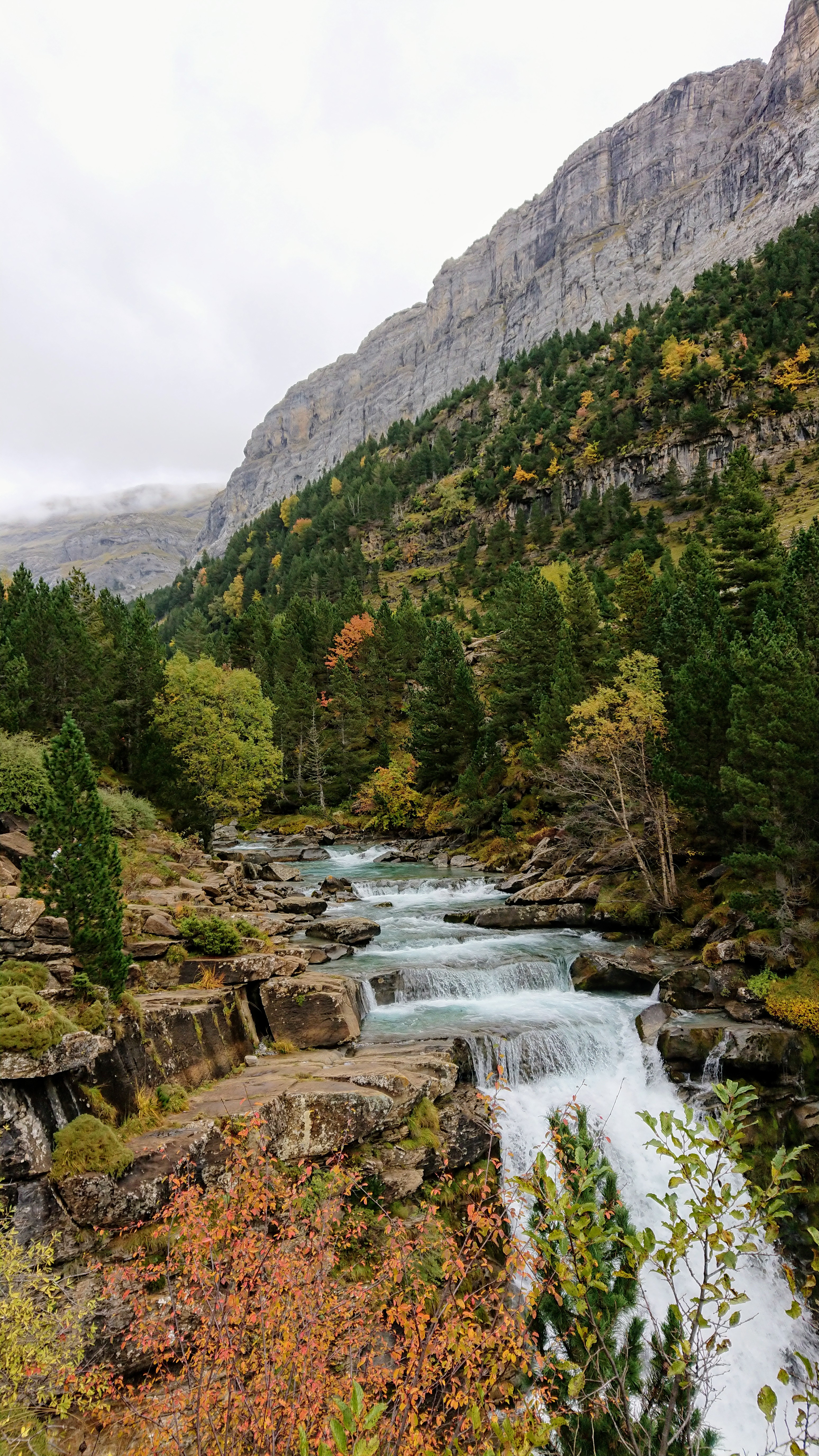
Arazas river fall, Ordesa valley

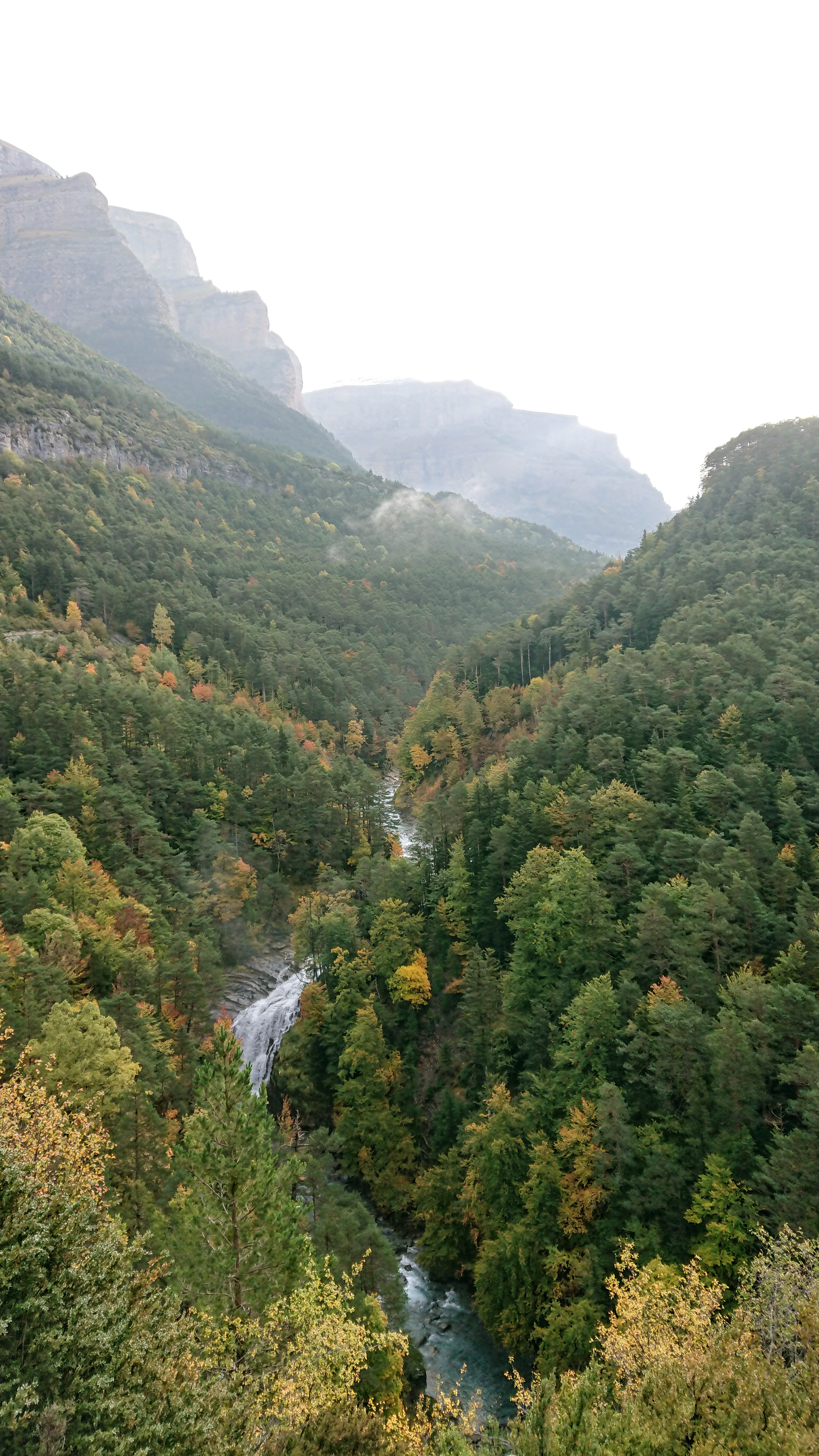
Entrance to the Ordesa Valley, Arazas river

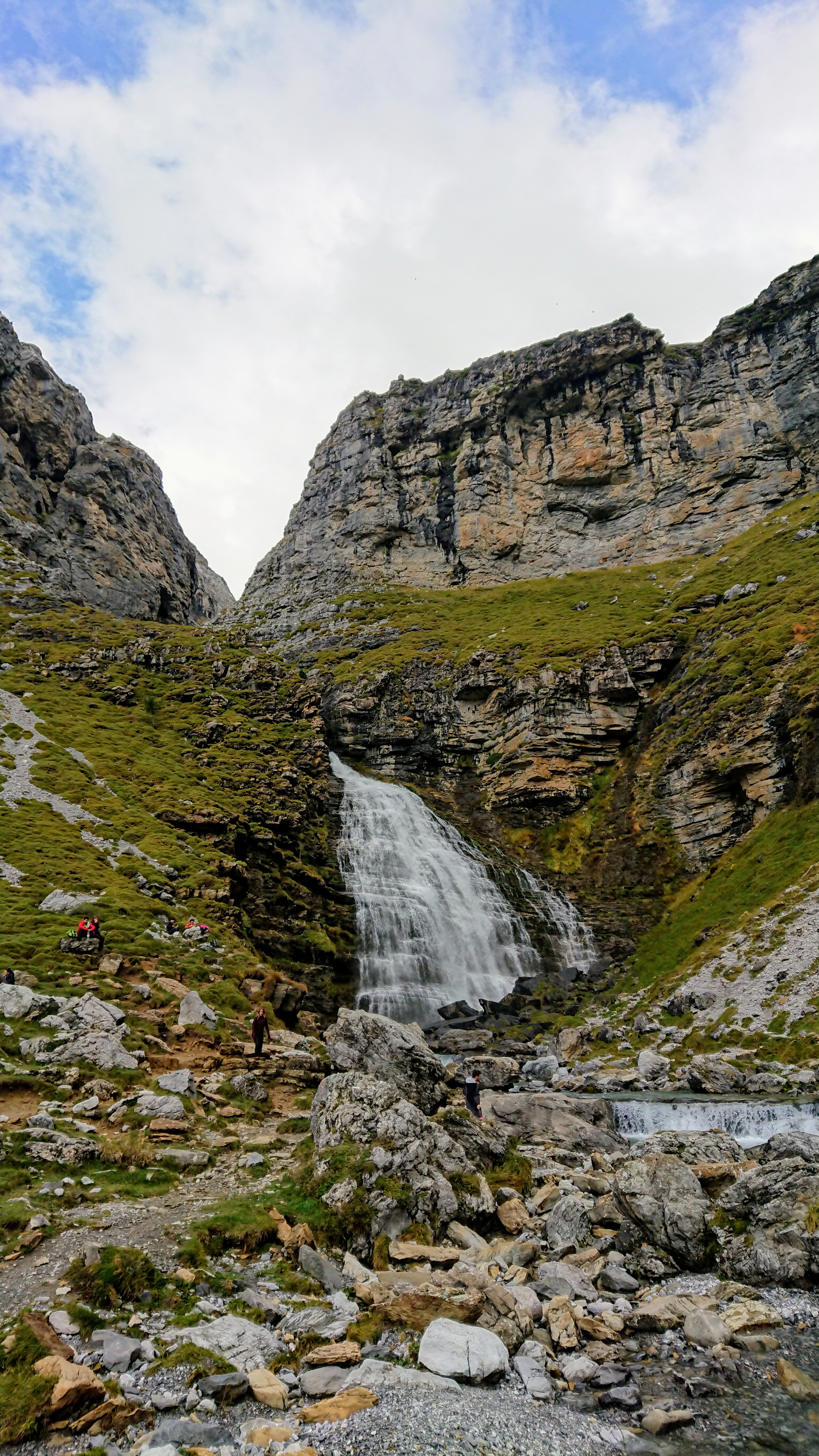
Cirque of Soaso and Horse Tail (Cola del Caballo)

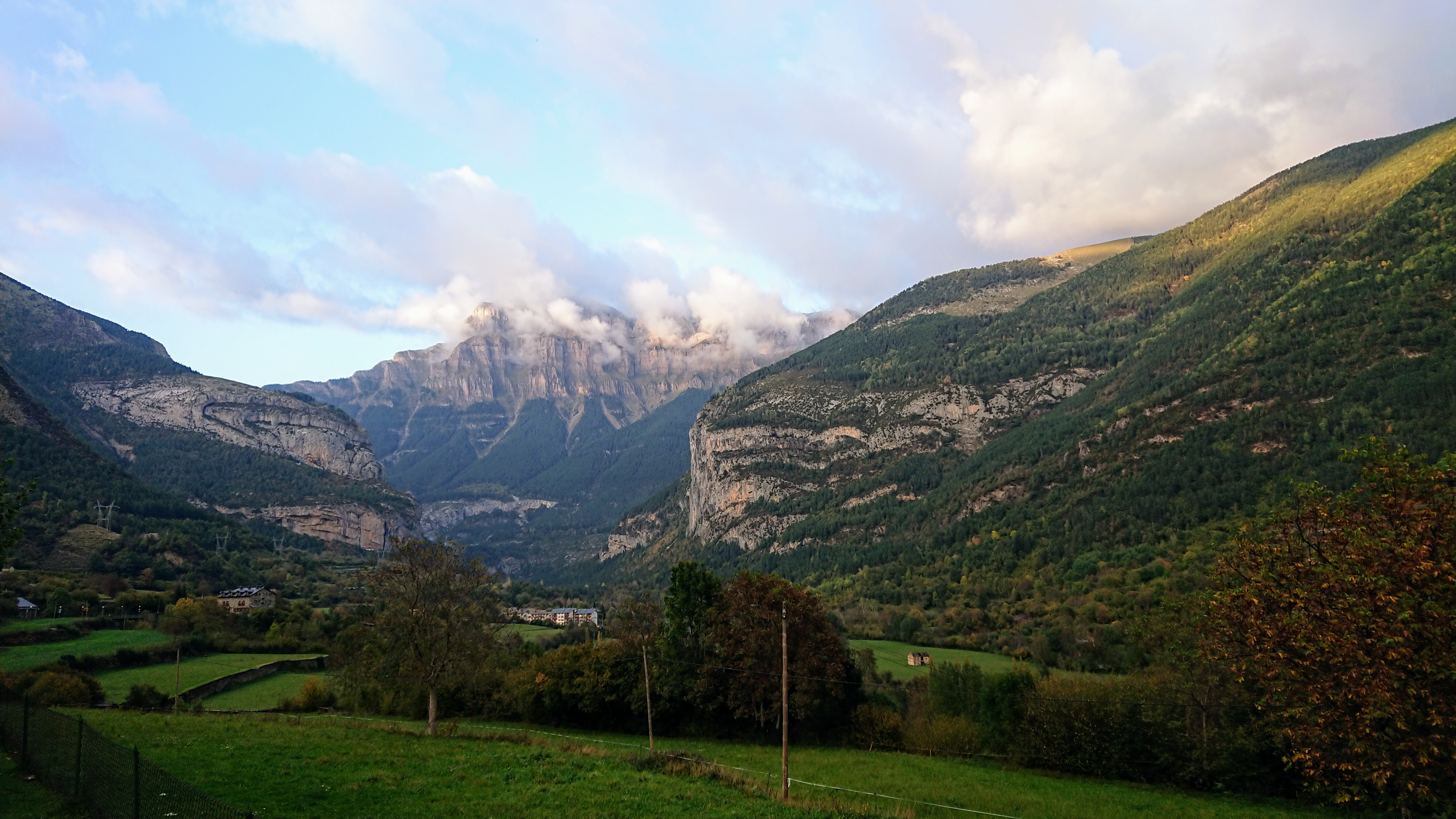
Entrance to Ordesa Valley from Torla

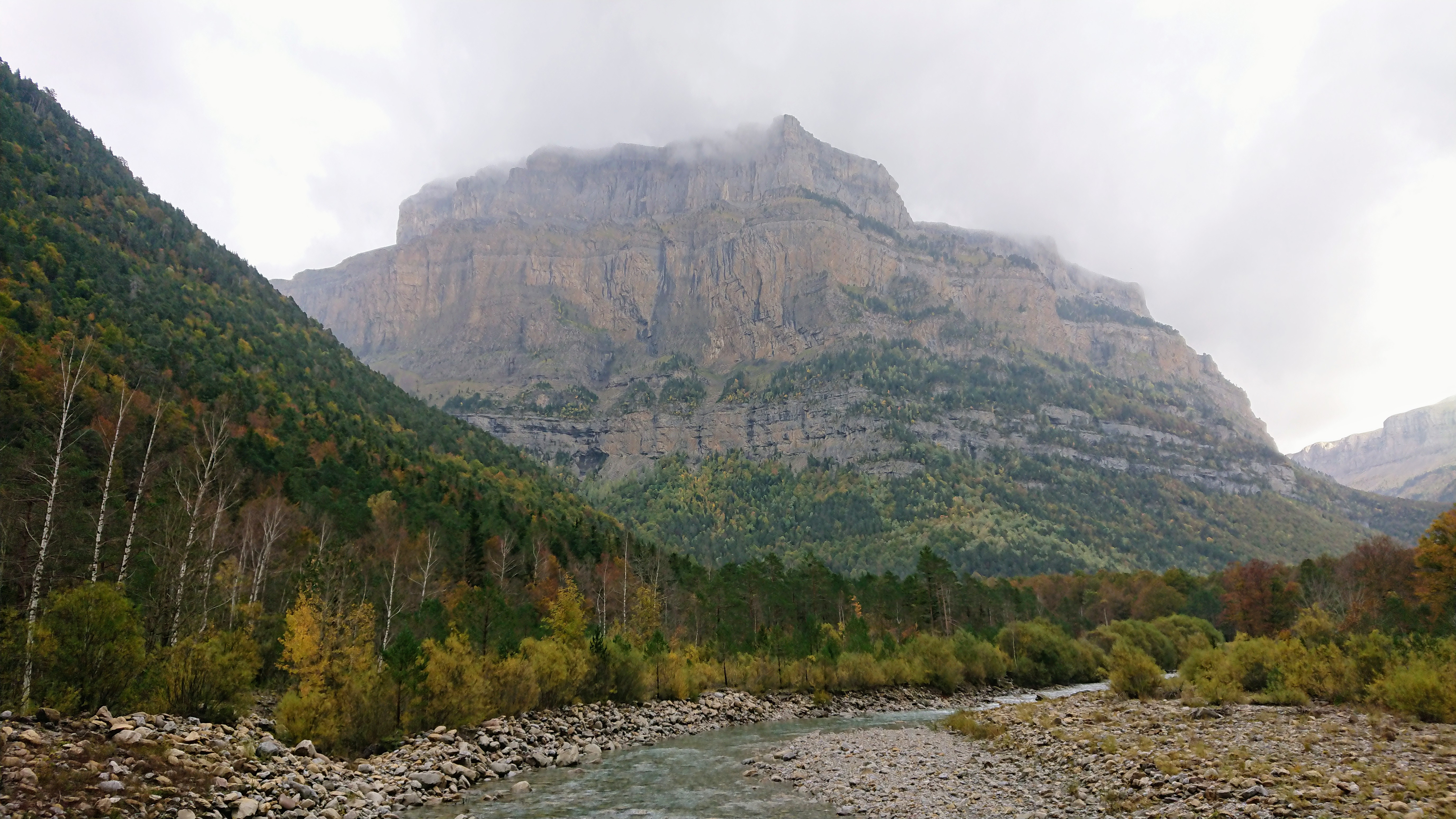
Punta Tobacor (2,779 m)

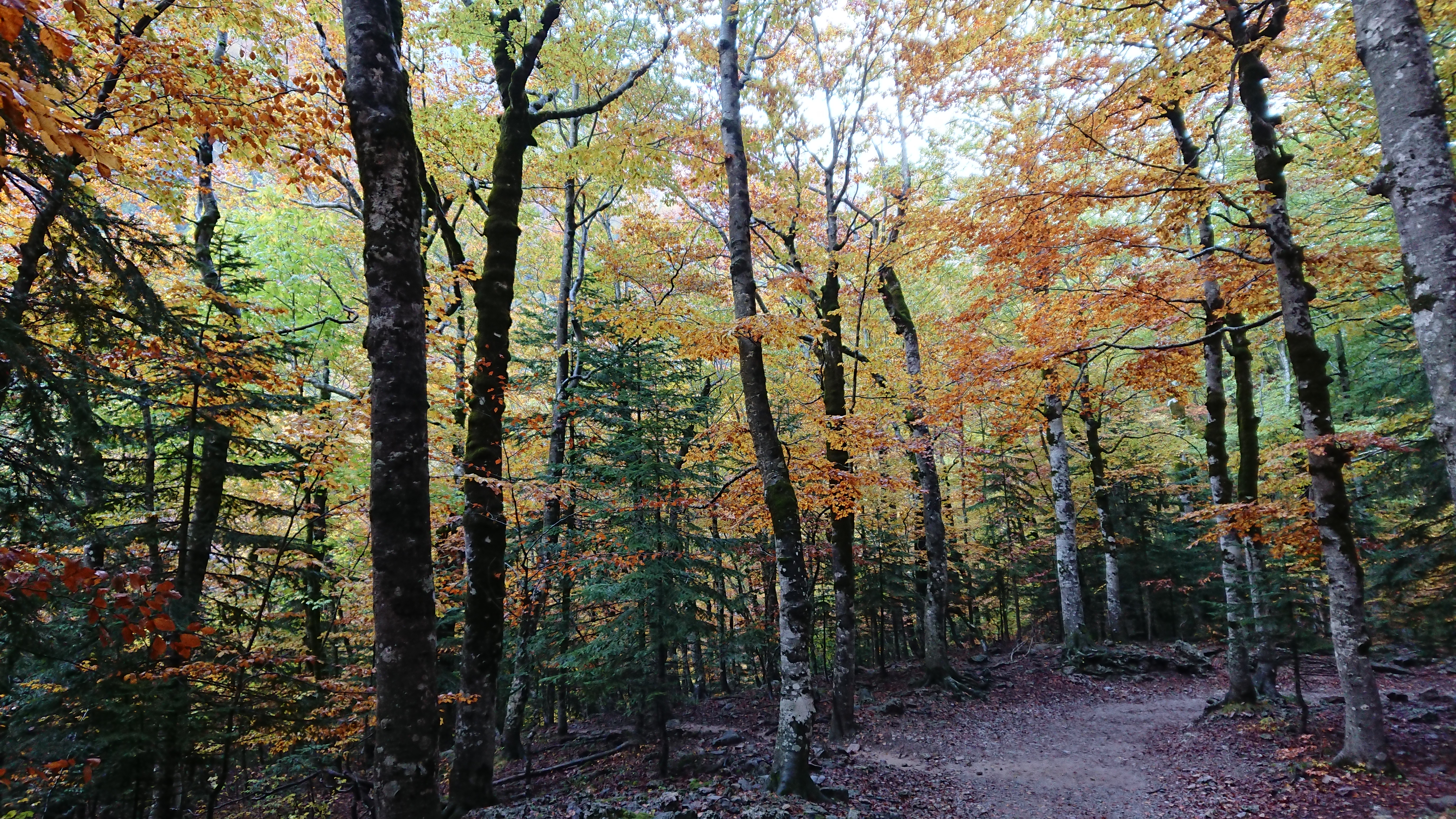
Path inside the park, Ordesa valley

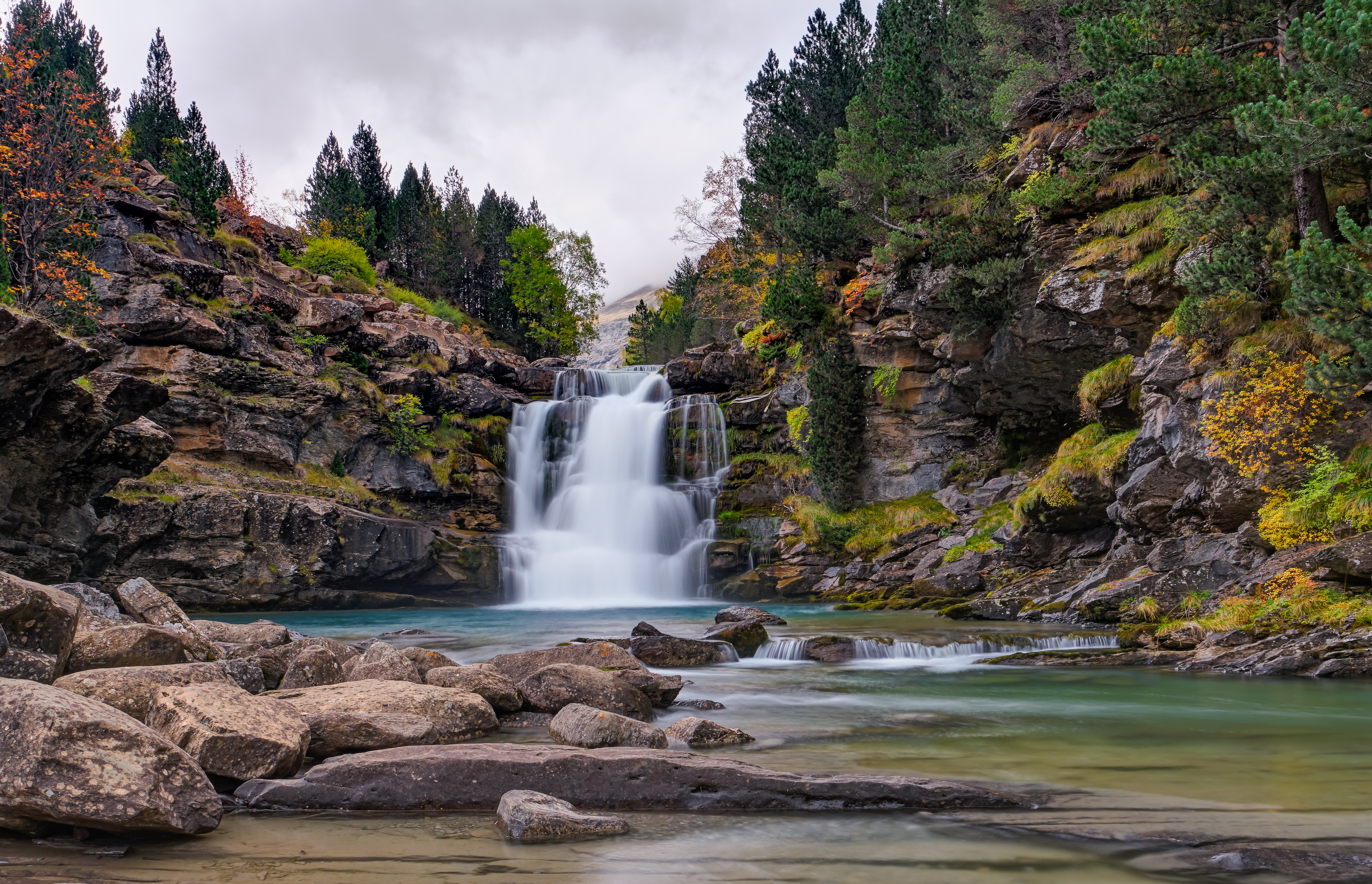

== Bibliography ==
- BENITO ALONSO, José Luis (2006). Vegetación del Parque Nacional de Ordesa y Monte Perdido (Sobrarbe, Pirineo central aragonés). 421 pp + Mapa de vegetación 1:40.000. Zaragoza: Serie Investigación, nº 50. Consejo de Protección de la Naturaleza de Aragón. Gobierno de Aragón. ISBN 84-89862-54-0.
- BENITO ALONSO, José Luis (2006). Catálogo florístico del Parque Nacional de Ordesa y Monte Perdido (Sobrarbe, Pirineo central aragonés). Lérida: Colección Pius Font i Quer, n.º 4. 391 pp. Institut d'Estudis Ilerdencs. Diputación de Lérida. ISBN 84-89943-88-5.
- BENITO ALONSO, José Luis (2014). Wild Flowers of Ordesa and Monte Perdido National Park (Spanish Pyrenees). Jolube Consultor Botánico y Editor, Jaca (Huesca): Colección Essential Guides of Flora, nº 1. 96 color pages. ISBN 9788494356162.
