= Monte Perdido =

Mountain in Spain

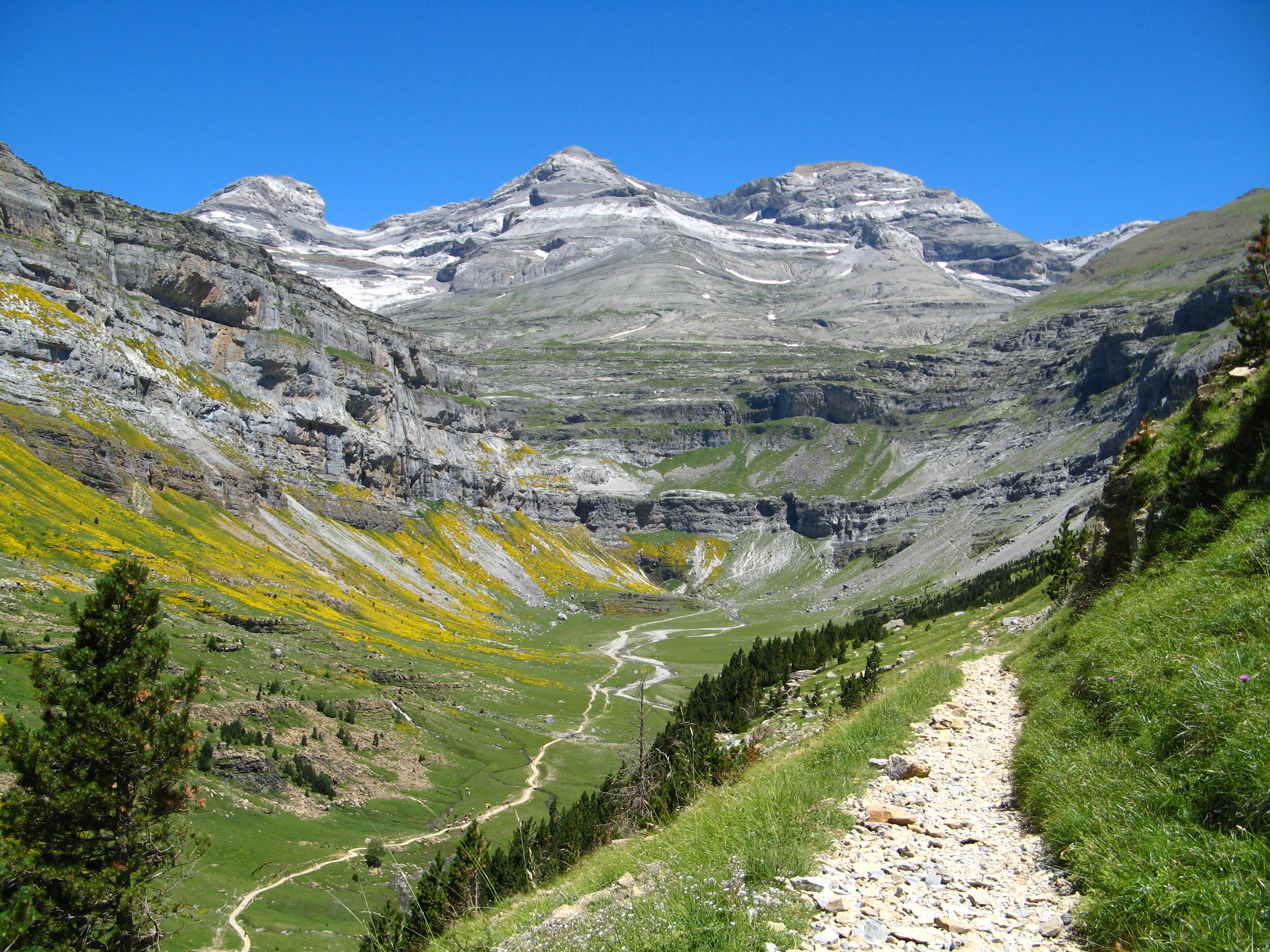
- Monte Perdido (center) and Cilindro de Marboré (left)

Highest point
- Elevation: 3,355 m (11,007 ft)
- Prominence: 969 m (3,179 ft)
- Coordinates: 42°40′N 0°02′E

Naming
- English translation: Lost mountain
- Language of name: Spanish

Geography
- Location within Pyrenees
- Location: Ordesa Valley, Huesca Province, Aragon, Spain
- Parent range: Pyrenees

UNESCO World Heritage Site
- Official name: Pyrénées - Mont Perdu
- Type: Mixed
- Criteria: iii, iv, v, vii, viii
- Designated: 1997 (21st session)
- Reference no.: 773
- Region: Europe and North America
- Extensions: 1999

Monte Perdido (in Spanish; Mont Perdu in French; both meaning lost mountain; Treserols in Aragonese; meaning three sisters) is the third highest mountain in the Pyrenees. The summit of Monte Perdido (3355 m), located in Spain, lies hidden from France by the seemingly impenetrable peaks of the Cirques of Gavarnie and Estaubé. It stands in the north of Huesca province. The mountain forms part of the Monte Perdido Range and is located in the Ordesa y Monte Perdido National Park, in the western part of the Pyrenees, in the community of Aragon, Spain.

== Description ==
Monte Perdido Glacier, located on the north-facing slope of Monte Perdido, is the third-largest glacier in the Pyrenees. It is surrounded by vertical cliffs up to 800m in height. Similar to most European glaciers, the Monte Perdido Glacier has been shrinking since the Little Ice Age, and since 1981, the glacier has lost 48 hectares of surface area. The rate of retreat is continuing to accelerate due to the effects of global climate change.

Access to the mountain is easier from Spain than from France. The route starts near the village of Torla, Aragon, at the Ordesa Valley and ascends the Cirque de Soaso towards the Refuge of Góriz before the steep climb up the final, often icy snow slopes to the summit.

== Protection ==
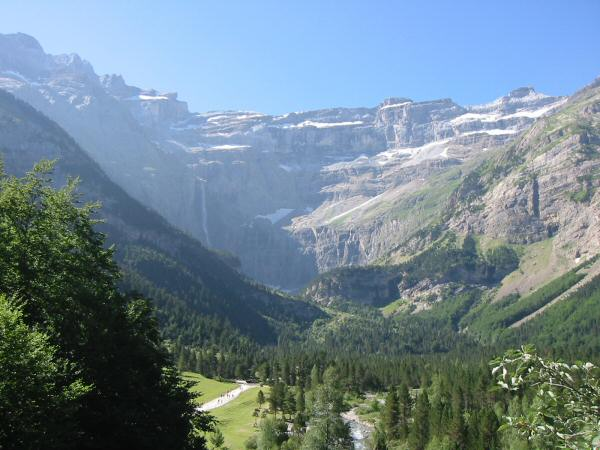
The Cirque de Gavarnie in the French section of the World Heritage Site

Monte Perdido is the centrepiece of the Spanish Ordesa y Monte Perdido National Park which was established in 1918 with just 21 square kilometres/hectares of land. In the 1970s work began to build a dam in the nearby Añisclo Canyon with the objective of creating hydroelectric energy but institutions and citizens demonstrated against this and succeeded in stopping it. In 1982 the park was expanded significantly to 156 square kilometres/hectares and now incorporates the whole of the Añisclo Canyon. There are more than 1,500 species of flowers, 171 species of birds, 32 different mammals and 8 types of reptile in the Ordesa. Among these is the lammergeier (bearded vulture) with a 3-metre wingspan. The Pyrenees is one of the few places in Europe where these birds can be seen.

The French side of the mountain is part of Pyrénées National Park.

Because of its imposing landforms, the mountain and surrounding areas were inscribed on the UNESCO World Heritage List in 1997 as Pyrénées – Mont Perdu. The World Heritage Site consists of the entire Ordesa y Monte Perdido National Park in Spain and the eastern part of Pyrénées National Park in France. The World Heritage Site comprises a total area of 30,639 hectares.

Centered on Monte Perdido, the world heritage site includes many quintessential geological landforms, including two of Europe's largest canyons on the Spanish site and cirque walls on the French site. Along the mountain slopes are meadows, caves, forests, and lakes. Although the Alps and the Caucasus Mountains both have higher biodiversity and endemism than the Pyrenees, the Pyrenees are somewhat less affected by recent human development than other European mountain ranges. However, like all mountain ranges in Europe, they show a consistent history of human occupation dating from the Paleolithic. These include a dolmen on the Spanish side and stone circles on the Cirque de Gavarnie. The villages and settlements that dot the landscape arose in the Middle Ages and are located in the valleys around Monte Perdido, using the runoff to irrigate their fields. A distinct pastoral system developed, where the livestock would move up and down the mountain slopes with the seasons.

Because each settlement has more in common with the neighboring settlements in the Pyrenees than they do with the rest of their respective sovereign nations (Spain and France), they have a degree of independence, and Spanish farmers are often allowed to graze on the French side and vice versa, in a system called transhumance.

== See also ==
- List of mountains in Aragon
- List of Pyrenean three-thousanders
