= Aldehuela de Periáñez =

- Municipality
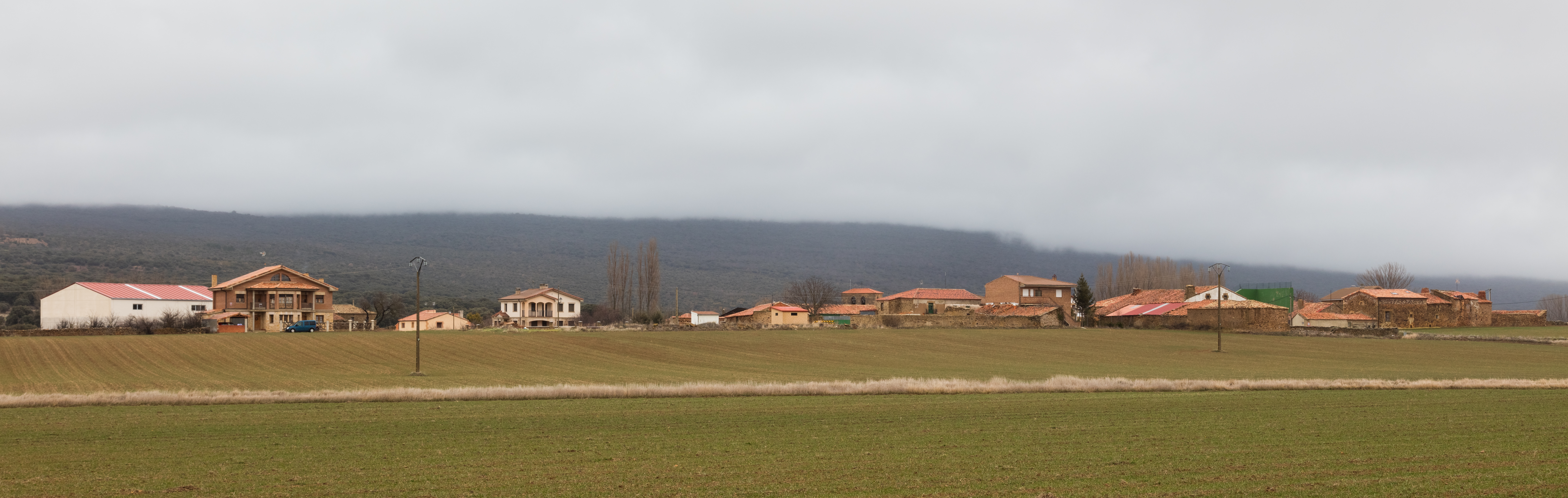

- Location in Spain. Aldehuela de Periáñez (Spain)
- Country: Spain
- Autonomous community: Castile and León
- Province: Soria
- Municipality: Aldehuela de Periáñez

Area
  - Total: 27 km^{2} (10 sq mi)
- Elevation: 1,053 m (3,455 ft)

Population (2025-01-01)
  - Total: 27
  - Density: 1.0/km^{2} (2.6/sq mi)
- Time zone: UTC+1 (CET)
  - Summer (DST): UTC+2 (CEST)
- Website: Official website

Aldehuela de Periáñez is a municipality located in the province of Soria, Castile and León, Spain. According to the 2004 census (INE), the municipality has a population of 53 inhabitants.
