= Aldehuela de Liestos =

- municipality
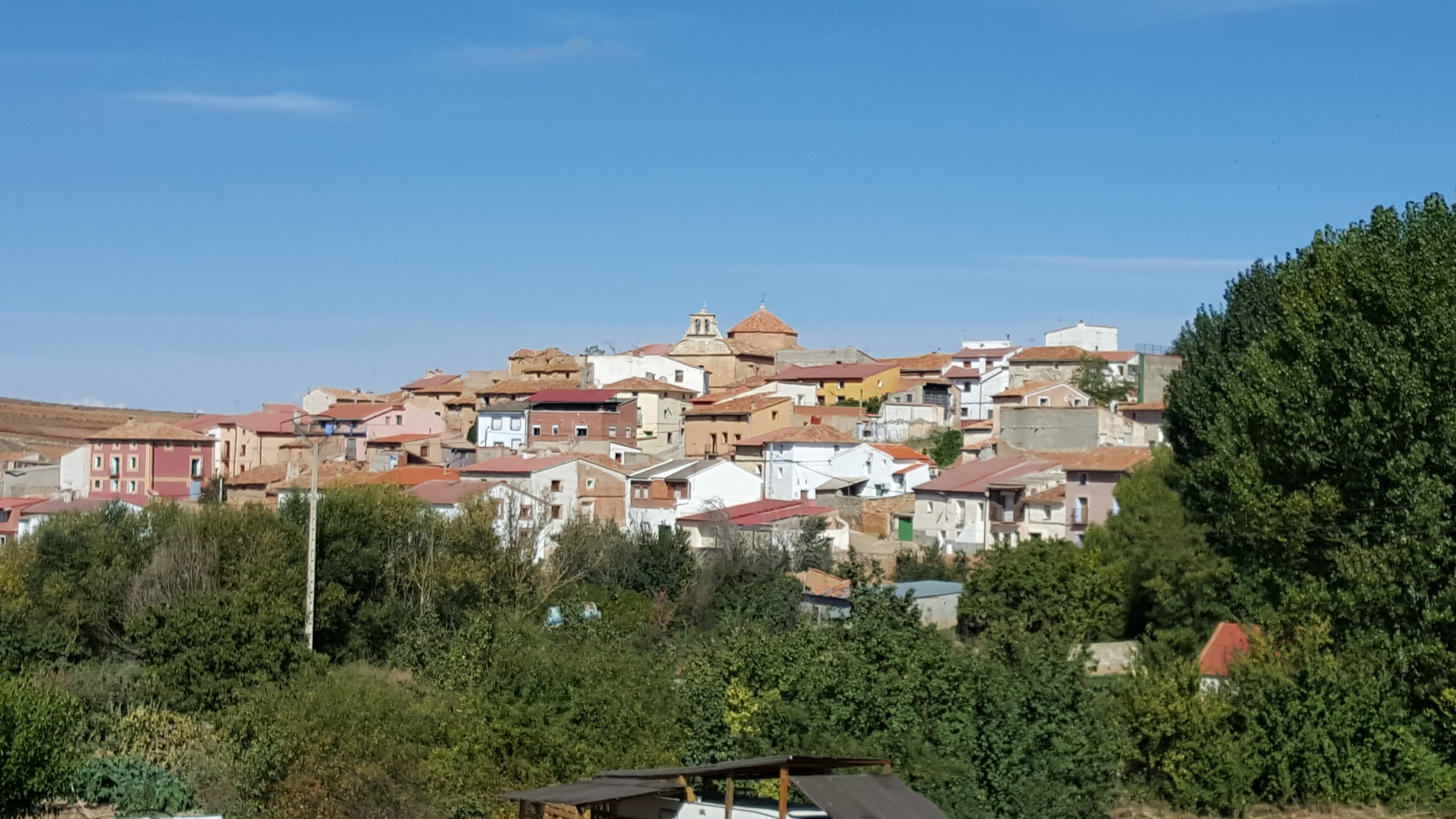

- Flag Coat of arms

- Location within Aragon Location within Spain Location within Europe
- Coordinates: 41°3′52.25″N 1°42′3.78″W
- Country: Spain
- Autonomous community: Aragon
- Province: Zaragoza
- Municipality: Aldehuela de Liestos

Government
  - Alcalde: Arcadio Muñoz Muñoz (PAR)

Area
  - Total: 38.12 km^{2} (14.72 sq mi)
- Elevation: 990 m (3,250 ft)

Population (2025-01-01)
  - Total: 48
  - Density: 1.3/km^{2} (3.3/sq mi)
- Time zone: UTC+1 (CET)
  - Summer (DST): UTC+2 (CEST)
- Postal Code: 50374

Aldehuela de Liestos is a municipality located in the province of Zaragoza, Aragon, Spain. According to the 2004 census (INE), the municipality has a population of 33 inhabitants.

== See also ==
- List of municipalities in Zaragoza
