= Víllora =

Víllora, Spain
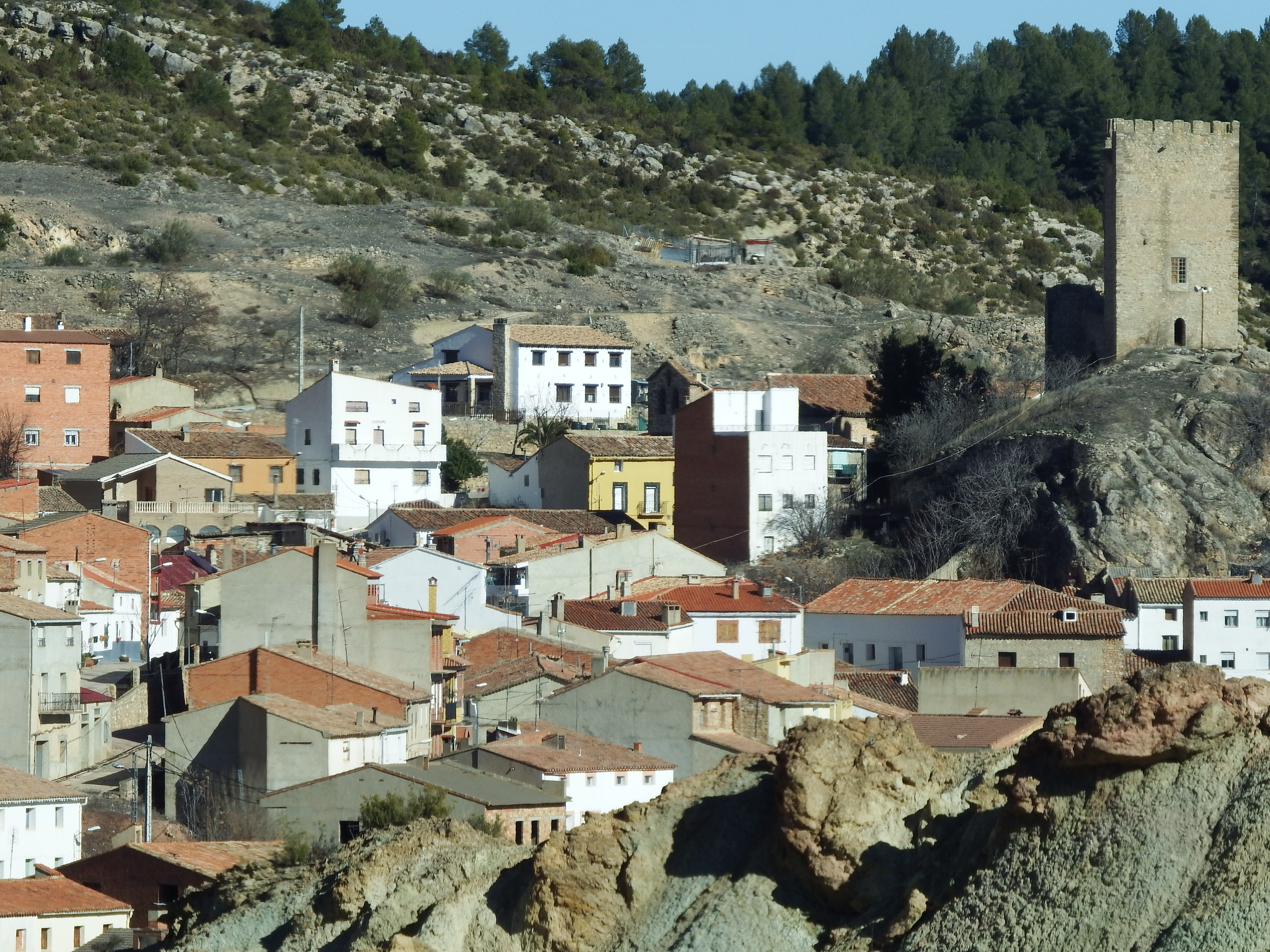
- General view of Villora

- Flag Coat of arms

- Location within Spain Location within Castilla-La Mancha
- Coordinates: 40°35′N 2°23′W
- Country: Spain
- Autonomous community: Castile-La Mancha
- Province: Cuenca
- Municipality: Víllora

Area
  - Total: 68 km^{2} (26 sq mi)

Population (2025-01-01)
  - Total: 120
  - Density: 1.8/km^{2} (4.6/sq mi)
- Time zone: UTC+1 (CET)
  - Summer (DST): UTC+2 (CEST)

Víllora is a municipality located in the province of Cuenca, Castile-La Mancha, Spain. According to the 2018 census (INE), the municipality has a population of 227 inhabitants.
