= Castle of Aldehuela =

Spanish fortification in the province of Jaén

Coordinates: 37°47′20″N 3°51′14″W

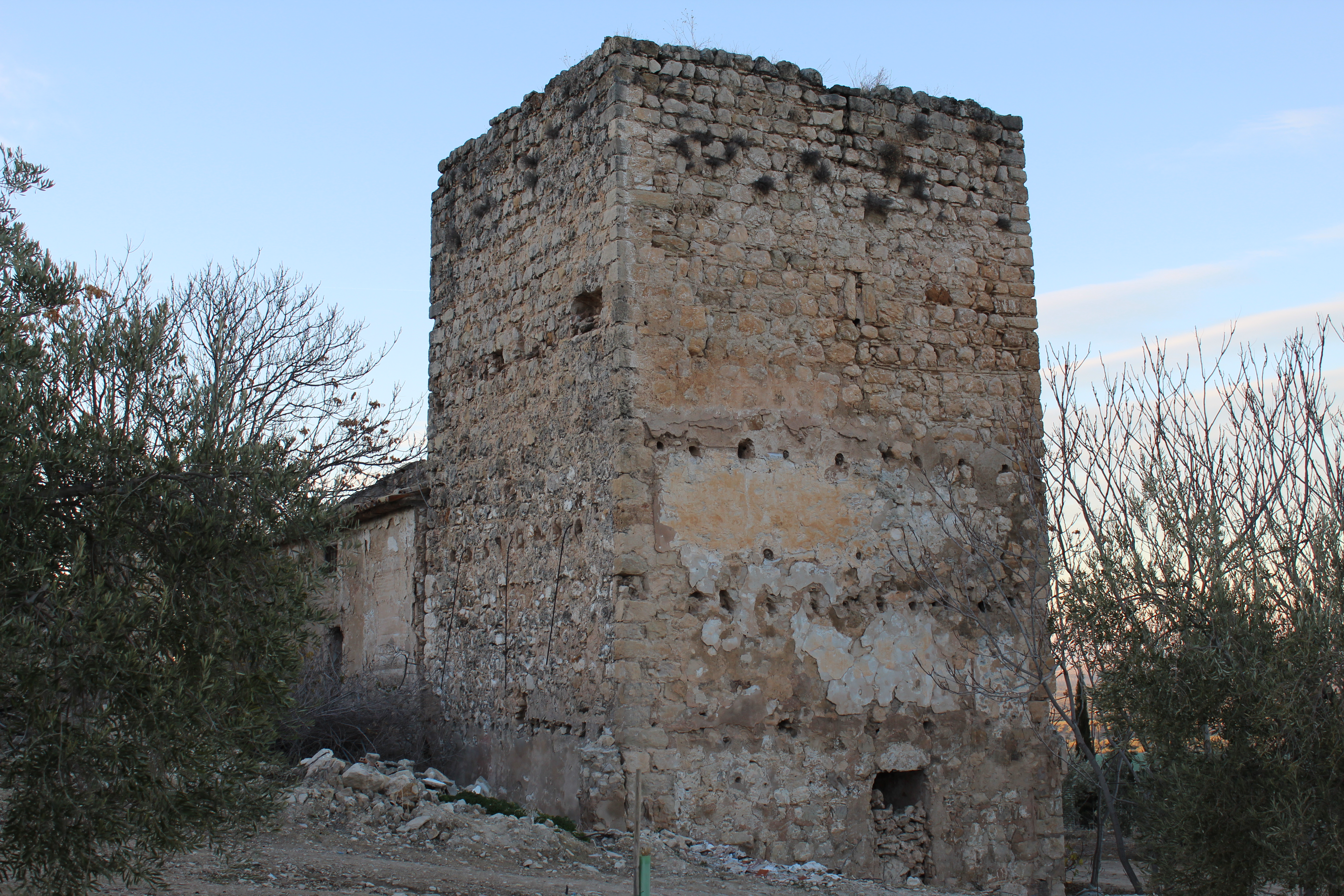
Castle tower

Aldehuela Castle is a Spanish fortification located on the road between Jaén and Torredelcampo, in the province of Jaén. It was declared a Bien de Interés Cultural landmark according to decree on 22 April 1949.
