= Las Aldehuelas =

- Municipality
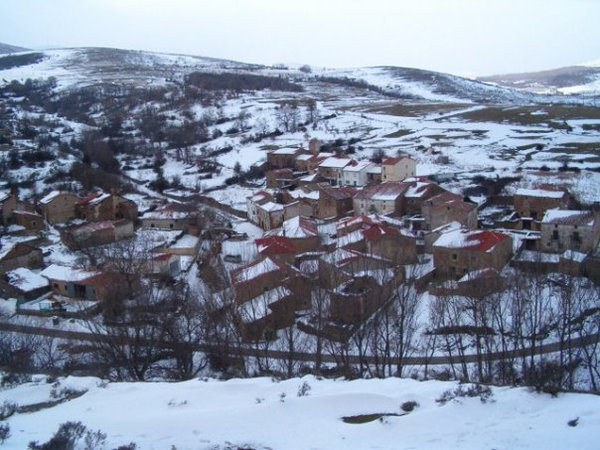

- Location in Spain. Las Aldehuelas (Spain)
- Coordinates: 41°59′40″N 2°21′51″W
- Country: Spain
- Autonomous community: Castile and León
- Province: Soria
- Municipality: Las Aldehuelas

Area
  - Total: 37 km^{2} (14 sq mi)

Population (2025-01-01)
  - Total: 58
  - Density: 1.6/km^{2} (4.1/sq mi)
- Time zone: UTC+1 (CET)
  - Summer (DST): UTC+2 (CEST)
- Website: Official website

Las Aldehuelas is a municipality located in the province of Soria, Castile and León, Spain. According to the 2004 census (INE), the municipality has a population of 104 inhabitants.
