= Aldehuela de Jerte =

Coordinates: 40°01′N 6°14′W

Aldehuela de Jerte, Spain
- municipality
- Flag Coat of arms
- Interactive map of Aldehuela de Jerte, Spain
- Country: Spain
- Autonomous community: Extremadura
- Province: Cáceres
- Municipality: Aldehuela de Jerte

Area
  - Total: 11 km^{2} (4.2 sq mi)
- Elevation: 265 m (869 ft)

Population (2025-01-01)
  - Total: 348
  - Density: 32/km^{2} (82/sq mi)
- Time zone: UTC+1 (CET)
  - Summer (DST): UTC+2 (CEST)

Aldehuela de Jerte is a municipality located in the province of Cáceres, Extremadura, Spain. According to the 2006 census (INE), the municipality has a population of 345 inhabitants.

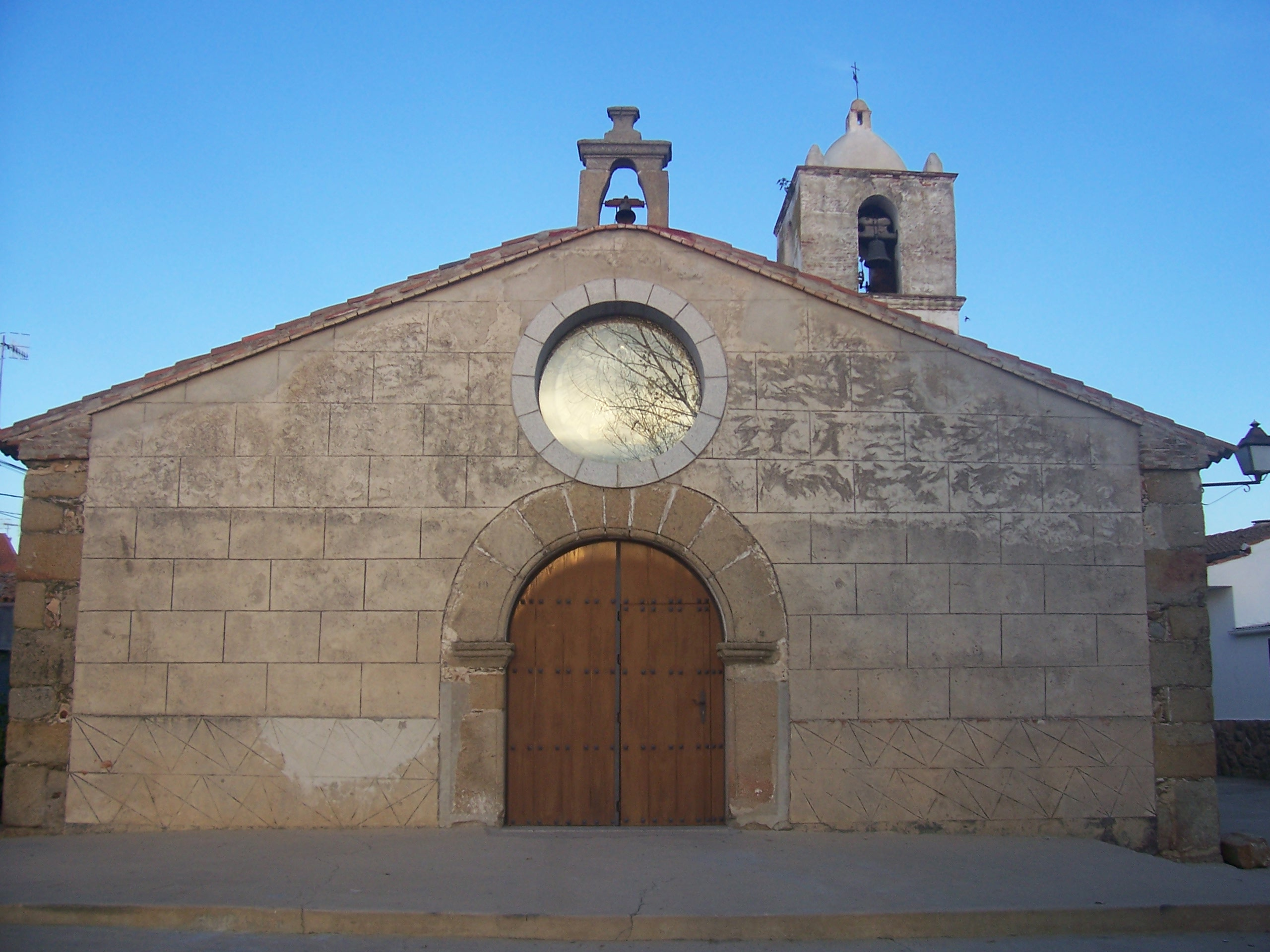
Iglesia Parroquial de San Blas

== See also ==
- List of municipalities in Cáceres
