= Torla-Ordesa =

Coordinates: 42°38′N 0°06′W

- municipality
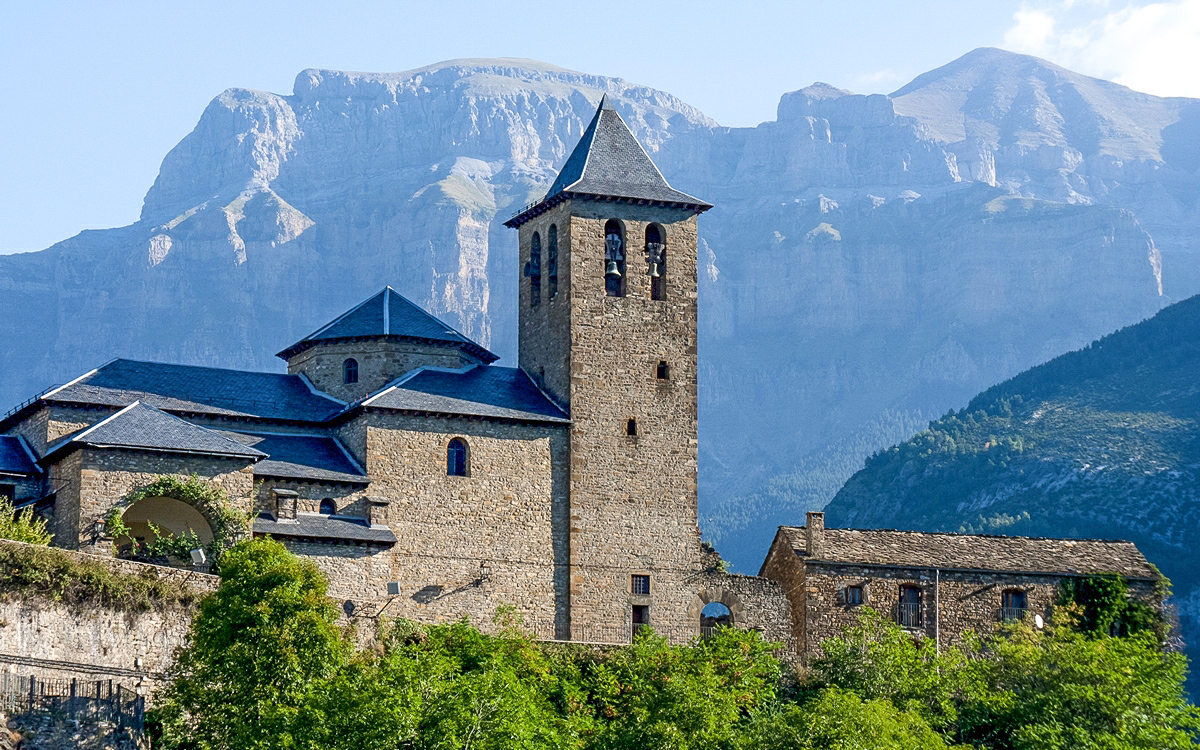
- Interactive map of Torla-Ordesa
- Country: Spain
- Autonomous community: Aragon
- Province: Huesca

Area
  - Total: 185 km^{2} (71 sq mi)

Population (2025-01-01)
  - Total: 342
  - Density: 1.85/km^{2} (4.79/sq mi)
- Time zone: UTC+1 (CET)
  - Summer (DST): UTC+2 (CEST)

Torla-Ordesa is a municipality in the province of Huesca, Aragon, Spain. It is in the northwest of the Sobrarbe region, 100 km from the capital of Huesca, and had 298 inhabitants according to the 2018 census (INE).

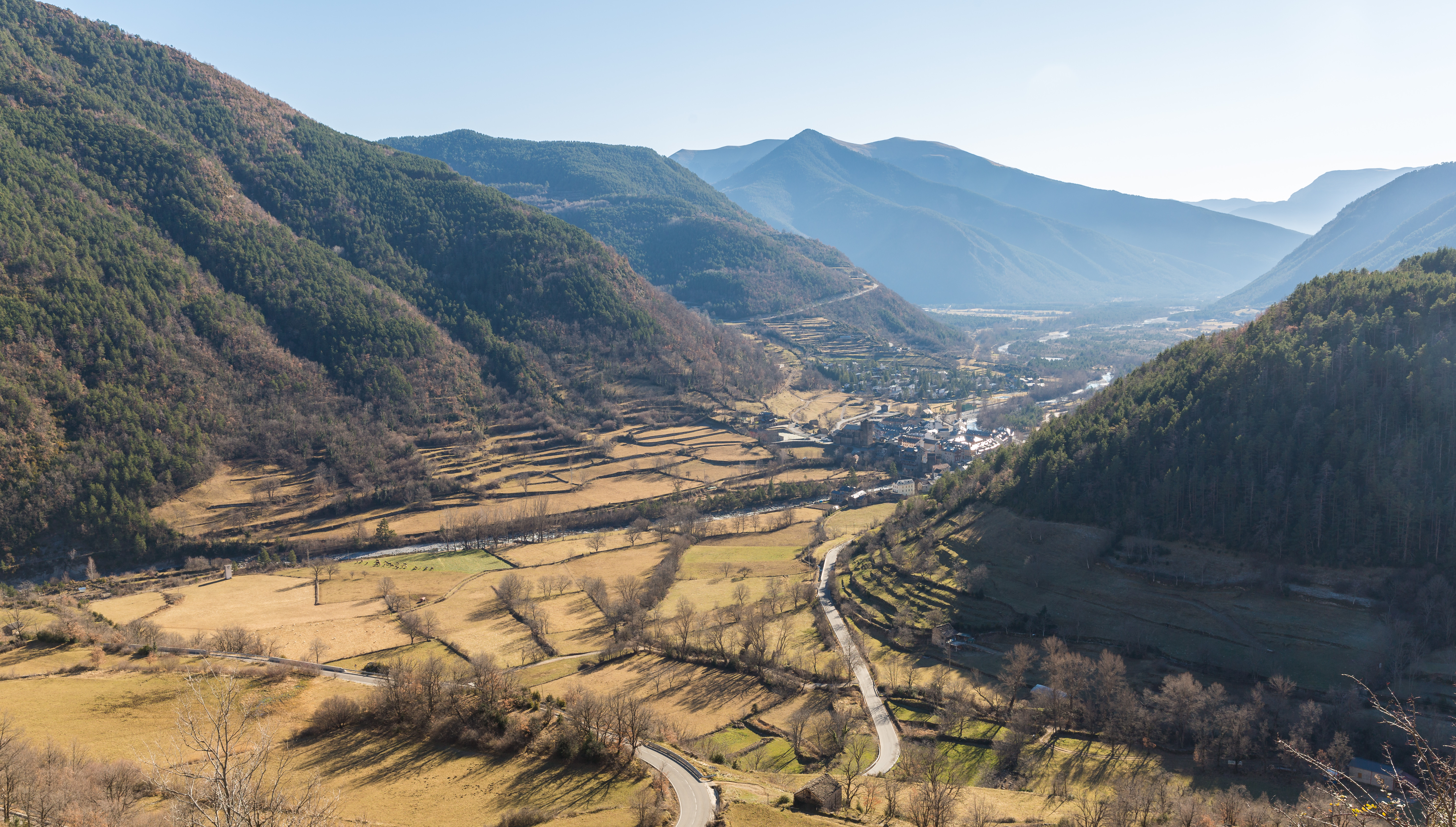
View of the valley where Torla-Ordesa is located.

Torla is in the glacial valley of the River Ara, after the confluence of the valleys of Bujaruelo and Ordesa, assuming that the glacier tongue reached Asin Broto, with more than 30 km in total. The Ara is said to be the only river of any importance in Spain that is not dammed by the human hand throughout its 70 km course to its confluence with the River Cinca in Ainsa.

Torla borders France but lacks a road connection with it, and is a gateway to the Ordesa y Monte Perdido National Park in the valley of Ordesa, and to Valle de Broto. It can only be accessed by the N-260 from Broto or from Biescas through the port of Cotefablo (1,423 m.). In summer, when access to the valley of Ordesa in Torla is restricted for private vehicles, buses are arranged through the park to climb to the meadow of Ordesa.

== See also ==
- List of municipalities in Huesca
