= Aldehuela del Codonal =

- Municipality
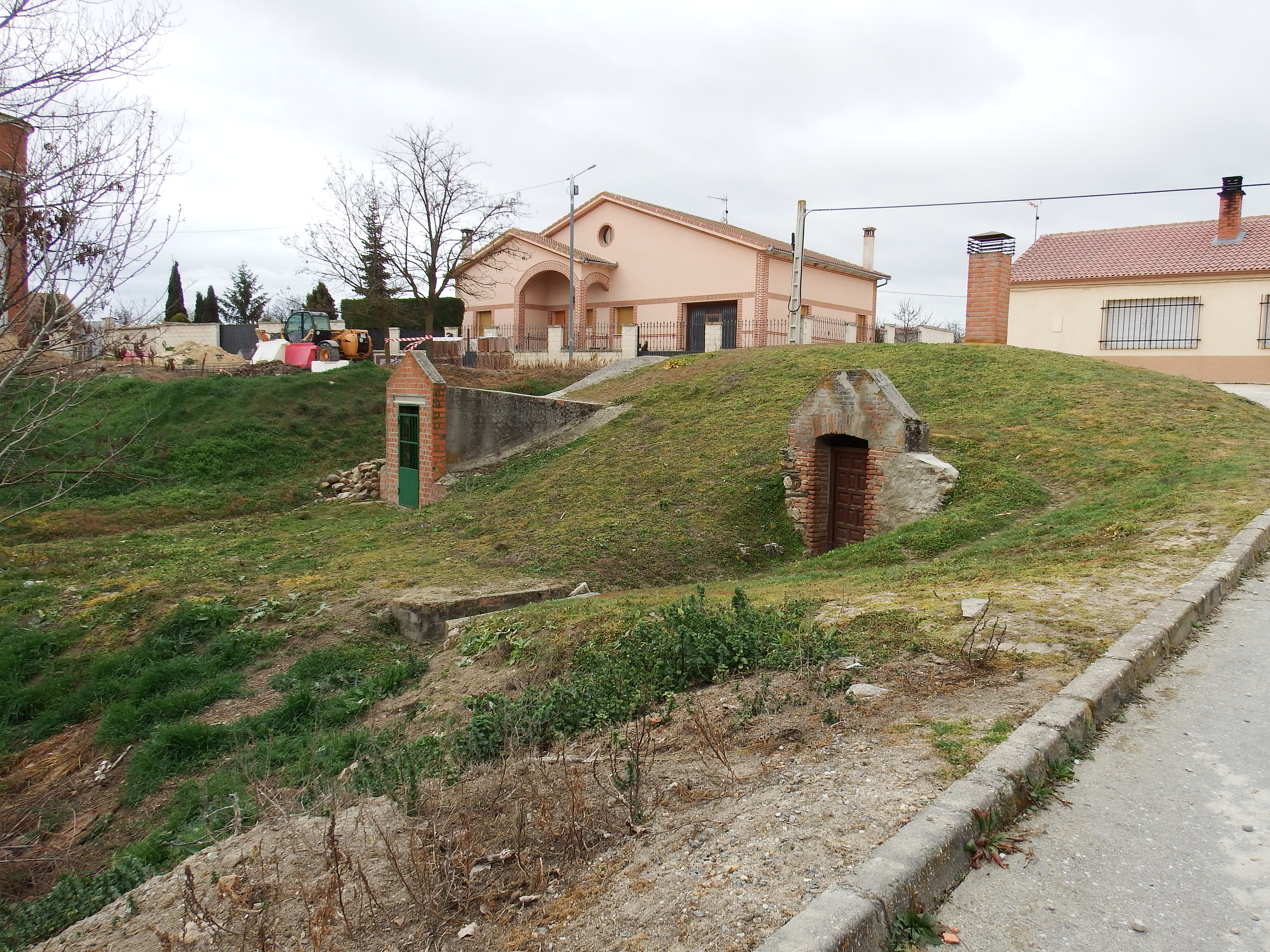
- View of Aldehuela del Codonal

- Location in Spain. Aldehuela del Codonal (Spain)
- Coordinates: 41°03′18″N 4°32′16″W
- Country: Spain
- Autonomous community: Castile and León
- Province: Province of Segovia
- Municipality: Aldehuela del Codonal

Area
  - Total: 13.42 km^{2} (5.18 sq mi)
- Elevation: 862 m (2,828 ft)

Population (2025-01-01)
  - Total: 24
  - Density: 1.8/km^{2} (4.6/sq mi)
- Time zone: UTC+1 (CET)
  - Summer (DST): UTC+2 (CEST)
- Website: Official website

Aldehuela del Codonal is a municipality located in the province of Segovia, Castile and León, Spain. According to the 2013 census (INE), the municipality had a population of 31 inhabitants.
