= Cilindro de Marboré =

Mountain in Spain

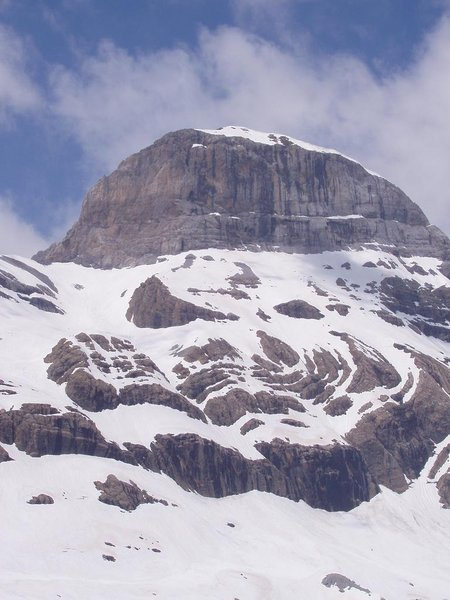
- northern side of the Pico Cilindro in Winter

Highest point
- Elevation: 3,328 m (10,919 ft)
- Listing: List of mountains in Aragon
- Coordinates: 42°41′5″N 0°01′26″E

Geography
- Location within Pyrenees
- Location: Huesca, Spain
- Parent range: Pyrenees

Geology
- Mountain type: Limestone

Climbing
- First ascent: 1864 by Henry Russell and Hippolyte Passet
- Easiest route: rock scramble, II

Cilindro de Marboré (3,328 m) (also known as Pico Cilindro and Pic du Cylindre) is a mountain in the Monte Perdido massif in the Pyrenees.

It is one of the three mountains comprising Las Tres Sorores (the three sisters), the others being Monte Perdido (3,355 m) and Soum de Ramond (3,263 m).

It is the northernmost point of Spain crossed by the IERS Reference Meridian.

== See also ==
- List of Pyrenean three-thousanders
