= Villafañe =

Villafañe is a surname that comes from Villafañe, a small town in León, Spain. Notable people with the surname include:

- Ángel de Villafañe (born 1504), Spanish conquistador of Florida, Mexico, and Guatemala
- Juan de Arphe y Villafañe (1535–1603), Spanish engraver, goldsmith, artist, anatomist and author
- Chunchuna Villafañe (born 1940), Argentine film and television actress
- Luis Villafañe (born 1981), Puerto Rican professional basketball player
- Nuno Villafane (born 2007), Spanish trampolinist
- Santiago Villafañe (born 1988), Argentine footballer who plays for FC Midtjylland
- Blanca Iris Villafañe (1935-2021), Puerto Rican Bolero singer.

== See also ==
- Mayor Vicente Villafañe, settlement in northern Argentina

Media related to Villafañe at Wikimedia Commons
