= Hanequin de Cuéllar =

Spanish architect and sculptor (1447 – 1518)

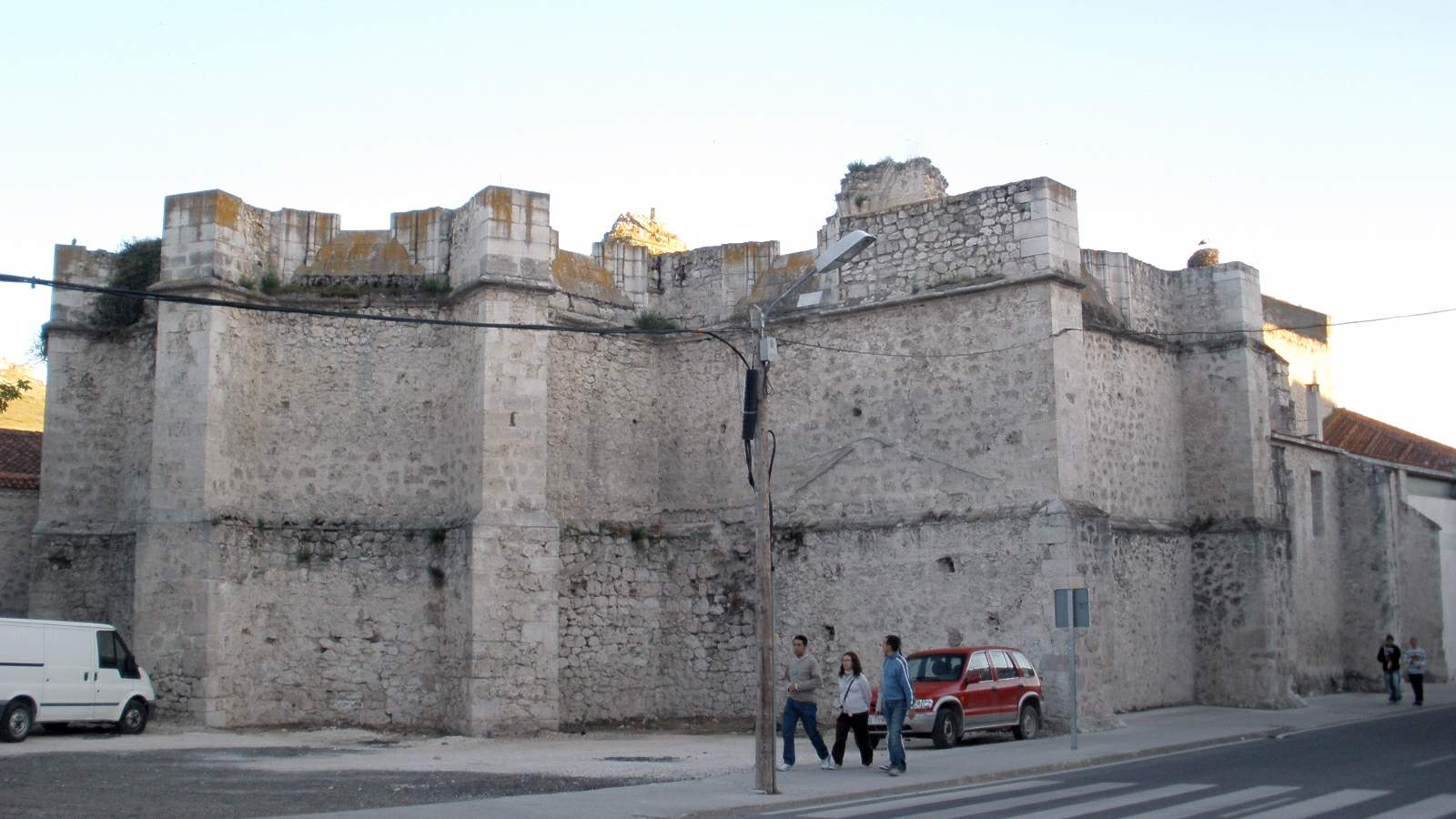
Monastery of San Francisco de Cuéllar, of which Hanequin de Cuéllar executed the design church in two phases, between 1476 and 1518.

Hanequin de Cuéllar (1447 – 1518) was a Spanish architect and sculptor who worked in Castile. In the documentation, he is named only as Hanequin and modern historians have given him the last name of Cuéllar because he lived and worked in the area of influence of Cuéllar (Segovia), and possibly to differentiate him from his father, Hannequin de Bruxelles, also an architect.

He appears for the first time continuing the works begun by his father in the Cuéllar Castle ordered in 1465 by Beltrán de la Cueva, 1st Duke of Alburquerque, remodeling the fortress left behind by Constable Álvaro de Luna. Then he appears as an officer and worked as a team with his uncle Antón Martínez de Bruselas. For the Dukes of Alburquerque, he also worked in the Monasterio de San Francisco (Cuéllar), where they raised his family pantheon. He carried out the project in two phases: first in 1476, and second in 1518. He died before the work was finished. Within the works, he made a new vault and other dependencies. Together with his father, he worked on the Basilica of la Asunción de Nuestra Señora (Colmenar Viejo) in Madrid at the end of the 15th century. He created a late-Gothic atrium decorated with Elizabethan balls and pomegranates in the church of San Miguel de Cuéllar.

He also carried out works in the monastery of Santa María de la Armedilla, in Cogeces del Monte (Valladolid), land of Cuéllar and patronage of the Dukes of Alburquerque. Being a neighbor of Cuéllar in 1508, he directed the construction work on the refectory and the kitchen, and in October 1511, living in the same town, he contracted remodeling work on the church, which was to be finished a year later, and for which he would charge 110,000 maravedis. The work consisted of raising the walls of the church, the doorway (currently in the Casa de Cervantes Museum), a door to the cloister, another to the sacristy and another to the choir, and other works.
