= Tomb of Gutierre de la Cueva =

Spanish Renaissance alabaster tomb

Sepulcro de Gutierre de la Cueva
- Tomb of Gutierre de la Cueva
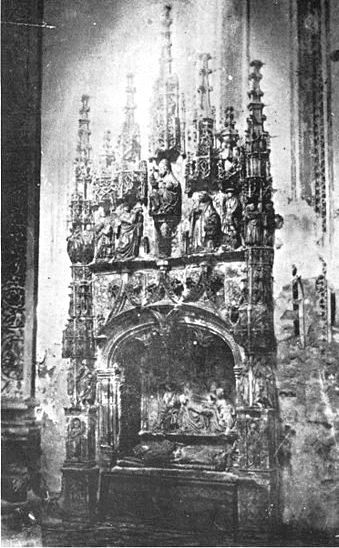
- Artist: Attributed to Vasco de la Zarza
- Year: c. 1500-1510
- Medium: Alabaster
- Dimensions: 3.87 m x 1.12 m approx.
- Location: Hispanic Society of America

The tomb of Gutierre de la Cueva is a Spanish sculptural work corresponding to the intermediate period between late Gothic and the first Castilian Renaissance, made in alabaster between the years 1500 and 1510 for the pantheon that the Duchy of Alburquerque built in the Monastery of San Francisco of Cuéllar (Segovia). The tomb was commissioned by Beltrán de la Cueva, favorite of Henry IV of Castile and first Duke of Alburquerque, for his brother the bishop Don Gutierre de la Cueva, who occupied the episcopal see of Palencia and thereby was Count of Pernía, who died in 1469.

Its authorship is debated, although the most accepted proposal attributes the ensemble to the sculptor Vasco de la Zarza, being considered one of his best works. Despite this, there are also influences from Burgalese Gothic sculpture, with similarities recorded with the tombs of John II of Castile and Isabella of Portugal, works by Gil de Siloé and other examples by Simón de Colonia or Felipe Bigarny.

Currently, most of the ensemble is preserved in the Hispanic Society of America (New York City), where it is regarded as one of the most impressive Renaissance sculptures in its collection, although fragments of the tomb are also preserved in the National Museum of Sculpture of Valladolid and in the Segovia Cathedral.

== History ==
Beltrán de la Cueva, first Duke of Alburquerque, ordered in his second will, granted in the Castle of Cuéllar on January 29, 1472, that alabaster tombs with the respective effigies or statues be built for him and two of his wives, another for his second wife and another for his brother Gutierre de la Cueva, to place them in the main chapel of the Monastery of San Francisco, in Cuéllar, whose patronage he acquired in 1476 to designate it as the family pantheon of his House.

The duke died in the year 1492, and his widow, María de Velasco, who had previously been the widow of Juan Pacheco, Marquess of Villena, considered herself to be in possession of the town of Cuéllar, and was therefore the first executor of Don Beltrán's will. For this she must have contacted some workshop in Burgos, since this influence is reflected in the base of the tomb, made surely due to the relationship that the widowed duchess had with the area, as she must have been born in that city, being the daughter of Pedro III Fernández de Velasco, second Count of Haro and sixth Constable of Castile, who built his mausoleum in the Burgos Cathedral a few years earlier.

Once the disputes over the possession of Cuéllar between María de Velasco and the duke's firstborn son, Francisco Fernández de la Cueva y Mendoza were resolved in favor of the latter, he must have changed the project initiated by his stepmother and commissioned the ensemble to the sculptor Vasco de la Zarza. It is known that the new model was already commissioned in 1498, since in an account book there is an entry by which 250,000 maravedís were to be paid for five alabaster effigies that are to be made in San Francisco de Cuéllar. On the contrary, the deadlines set for the execution of the work are unknown, which seems to have been carried out between the years 1500 and 1510. Despite this, in 1525, the year in which the second duke granted his will, it was not placed in the main chapel of San Francisco, as he himself maintains in the cited text:

«I say that because the chapel of San Francisco is not finished, the effigies that I have made of alabaster have not been placed, nor the grille nor the banners of their arms that the said duke my lord ordered in his will to be placed. Therefore I order that the said chapel be finished and the said effigies and grille, banners and their arms be placed if I have not left it finished and placed».

It is unknown whether it was Don Francisco, who died in 1526, or his son, Beltrán II de la Cueva y Toledo, third duke, who completed the installation work of the tombs. Some documents suggest that it was not totally finished in 1538, but they seem to refer to the chapel and not to the funerary ensemble, so the date of placement would have to be placed between 1526 and 1538.

During the Peninsular War the French occupied the monastery and caused serious damage to the entire church, including the sculptural ensemble, leaving some faces of the sculptures partially mutilated. After the confiscation the monastery was exclaustrated, and remained closed in constant deterioration, aggravated by the installation of a flour factory inside the church. Finally, in the year 1906 the then duke José Isidro Osorio y Silva-Bazán, known as Pepe Osorio, the Grand Duke of Sesto, sold the ensemble to a dealer for Archer Milton Huntington, founder of the Hispanic Society of America, immediately transferring the tombs to New York City. The price for which the ensemble was sold is completely unknown, as no documentation of its purchase and transfer is preserved, since Huntington was very jealous about hiding prices and agreements in his acquisitions.

== Description ==
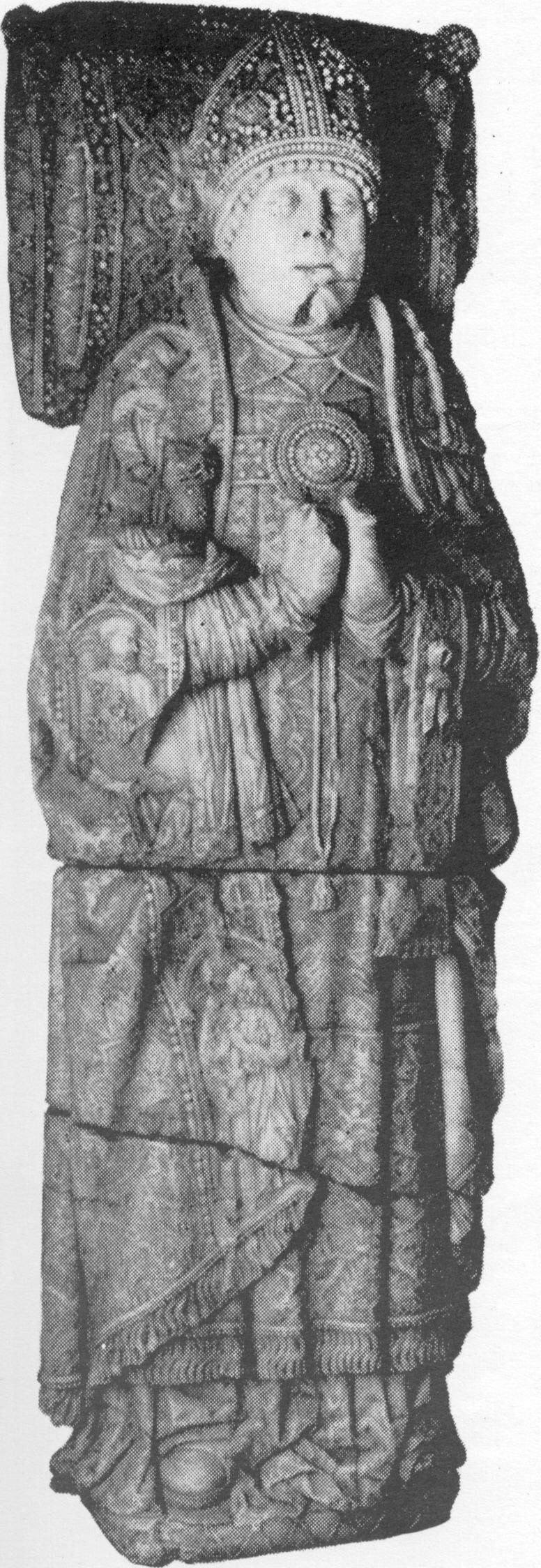
Recumbent statue of Gutierre de la Cueva.

The tomb was located on the Epistle side of the crossing of the conventual church. It is made entirely of alabaster and the preserved pieces have a length of 3.87 m x 1.12 m, so it is larger than that of the infante Alfonso of Castile in the Charterhouse of Miraflores (Burgos); it has aesthetic similarities with that of the archdeacon Fernando Díaz de Fuentepelayo, attributed to Gil de Siloé.

The monument is composed of four levels; the base started from the ground on a carved slab of reddish jasper that was transferred at the beginning of the XX century to the Segovia Cathedral, and is currently in an unknown location. On it rose a structure of four columns decorated with vegetal grotesques, which start from the back of a headless hairy animal, two of which are currently in the aforementioned cathedral. In the center of the front, and framed by the columns, was a panel with the coat of arms of the Cueva, and flanking it, two panels decorated with a pair of mermaids and cornucopias, which are currently in the National Museum of Sculpture of Valladolid and in the chapel of the Cabreras of Segovia Cathedral, one in each institution.

On the second level is the recumbent statue of Gutierre de la Cueva, and in front of it appears the scene of the Descent from the Cross, attempting to symbolize the typical message of funerary art, where the deceased trusts in his Resurrection just as it happened with Christ; next to this scene, appears a relief of Our Lady of Piety.

On the third level is the scene of the Annunciation, which aims to reinforce the previous message, and is composed of the archangel Saint Gabriel with Saint Bonaventure at one end, and on the other the Virgin Mary accompanied by Saint Jerome, all under five guardapolvos. A fourth level crowns the scene with a seated image of the Eternal Father, surrounded by seven large cresting needles, adorned with excellent little figures that flank the depressed arch; on them rests the armorial with the arms of the House of la Cueva adorned with the ecclesiastical and noble attributes that corresponded to him by his dignities.

Its current situation, disassembled in three heights, allows greater detail appreciation of the ensemble. From a stylistic point of view, the carving stands out that recalls other works, such as the reliefs of Felipe Bigarny in the Burgos Cathedral and other works by Gil de Siloé, although in this case the quality of the fine details in the faces, the jewels and the clothes, especially the borders and laces with which the tunics are adorned, stands out especially. The moldings, scallops and background ornaments in bas-relief also confer great quality to the tomb.

== Debate about its authorship ==
Despite the fact that the most accepted theory attributes the work to Vasco de la Zarza, there are different opinions regarding the execution of the tomb. The first historian to consider that it is a work carried out by Vasco de la Zarza was the Granadan Manuel Gómez-Moreno, who not only maintained the thesis that it is one of his first quality works, but qualifies it as one of the best that the master made. Gómez-Moreno's analysis contends that the artist made the work prior to the Alonso Fernández de Madrigal tomb, as well as that of the Tostado, both in the Ávila Cathedral.

Professor Beatrice Gilman Proske also attributes the work to Vasco de la Zarza, but she places its chronology between 1508 and 1517. Finally, Miguel Ángel Marcos Villán, belonging to the National Museum of Sculpture, agrees with Gómez-Moreno's opinion.

For its part, the current owner (Hispanic Society of America) considers that it is a Burgalese work very similar to other compositions made in the city at the same time, and although it does not attribute it to a specific author, it considers that the artist was at least influenced by the works of Diego and Gil de Siloé, and by that of Bigarny.

== Bibliography ==
- Gómez-Moreno Martínez, Manuel (1931). La escultura del Renacimiento en España [Renaissance Sculpture in Spain] (in Spanish). Barcelona: Editorial Firenze.
- Hispanic Society of America (2000). Codding, Mitchell A.; Figueroa Villota, Mencía; O'Neill, John (eds.). Hispanic Society of America. Tesoros [Hispanic Society of America. Treasures] (in Spanish). New York: The Hispanic Society of America. ISBN 0-87535-152-2.
- Marcos Villán, Miguel Ángel (1998). "Acerca de los sepulcros de alabastro de la iglesia del convento de San Francisco de Cuéllar (Segovia), panteón de don Beltrán de la Cueva, I Duque de Alburquerque" [On the alabaster tombs in the church of the Convent of San Francisco de Cuéllar (Segovia), the burial vault of Don Beltrán de la Cueva, 1st Duke of Alburquerque]. Boletín del Museo Arqueológico Nacional (in Spanish). 16 (1–2): 199–220. ISSN 0212-5544.
- Velasco Bayón, Balbino (1973). "El convento de San Francisco de Cuéllar" [The Convent of San Francisco de Cuéllar]. Archivo Ibero-americano (in Spanish). 33: 269–300.
- Velasco Bayón, Balbino (1996). Historia de Cuéllar [History of Cuéllar] (in Spanish) (Fourth ed.). Segovia: Diputación Provincial de Segovia. ISBN 84-500-4620-3.
