= Vasco de la Zarza =

Spanish sculptor (died 1524)

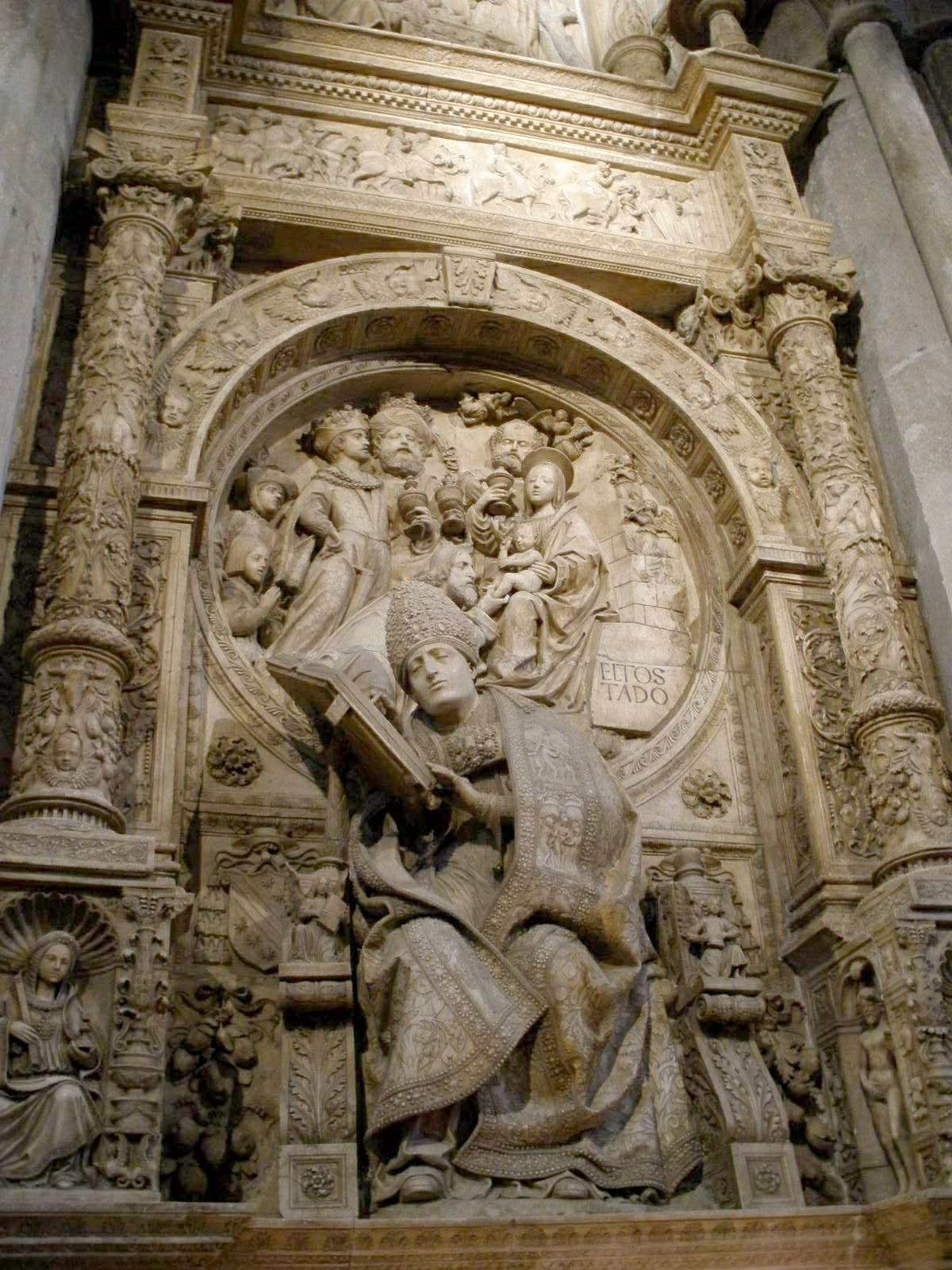
Sepulchre of Alonso Fernandez de Madrigal by Vasco de la Zarza, Ávila Cathedral, 1518

Vasco de la Zarza (died 1524) was a Spanish Renaissance sculptor. He flourished between 1499 and 1524, and worked mainly for the Cathedral of Avila and convents of the same city, but also performed works in Ampudia, Cuéllar, Olmedo and Toledo.

== Early career ==
Vasco de la Zarza may have been born in Toledo, although others have considered him of Portuguese origin. He is first mentioned in 1499, when he was charged with the size of the tabernacle altar of the Ávila Cathedral, which he completed in 1508. His work shows influences of Domenico Fancelli. He is believed to have taken a trip to Italy in his youth, which would have enabled contact with Italian Renaissance art, which is seen as an influence in his style.

== Works ==
His most important work is the tomb with Alonso Fernandez de Madrigal (1518) made of alabaster. Alonso de Madrigal, a leading humanist, is represented in the act of writing on a lectern. At the base of the sculpture are represented virtues and over, on a large circular relief, the Adoration of the Magi. Above, on the frieze shows the cavalcade of the Magi and, topping the composition, the Nativity. In the four side panels, framed by richly ornate and simple cover, the four evangelists in the act of writing, there are over roundels with representations of saints and, above them, several scenes from the life of Christ. His latest work documented in Ávila in 1522, is the tabernacle of the main altar, carved in alabaster, with scenes of the Passion. He also attributed the tomb of Hernán Núñez de Arnalte, treasurer of the Catholic Monarchs, Santo Tomas de Avila and many other works in Ávila and other nearby locations.

In the province of Segovia he completed tombs for Beltrán de la Cueva, 1st Duke of Alburquerque, his three wives and his brother, in the church of the monastery of San Francisco de Cuéllar. In the Toledo Cathedral in 1515 he carved the tombs of Alonso Carrillo de Albornoz and Inigo Lopez Carrillo de Mendoza, in the chapel of San Ildefonso. In the province of Valladolid with Alonso Berruguete he conducted in 1523 the altarpiece of the chapel of the monastery at Olmedo, Valladolid.

The tomb of Gutierre de la Cueva, currently located in the Hispanic Society of America museum, is attributed to Vasco de la Zarza, although the authorship is currently unknown.
