= Cuéllar Castle =

Castle in Cuéllar, Segovia, Spain

- Castillo de Cuéllar
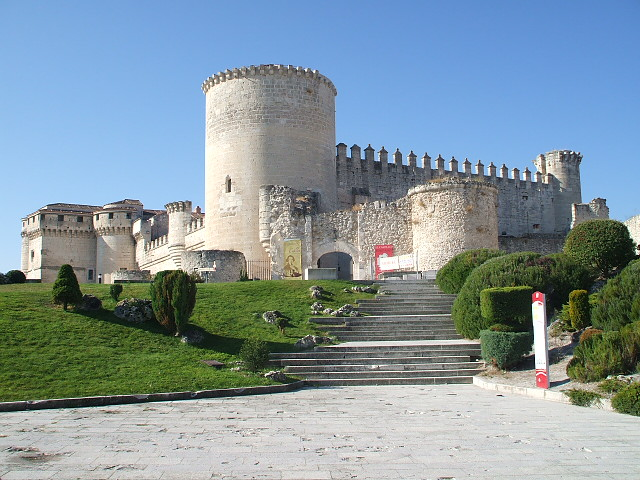
- Cuéllar Castle
- Alternative names: Castle-Palace of the dukes of Albuquerque (Castillo-Palacio de los duques de Alburquerque)

General information
- Location: Cuéllar; Province of Segovia; Castile and León; Spain, Calle del Palacio, s/n
- Coordinates: 41°24′03″N 4°19′12″W
- Current tenants: Ministry of Education of Spain; IES Duque de Alburquerque
- Construction started: 11th century
- Completed: 17th century
- Renovated: 1972
- Owner: Juan Miguel Osorio y Bertrán de Lis; XIX Duke of Alburquerque; XVI Marquis of Cuéllar

Height
- Height: 20 m

Technical details
- Floor area: 1,025 m^{2} (11,030 sq ft)

Design and construction
- Architects: Hanequin of Brussels; Hanequin of Cuéllar; Juan Guas; Rodrigo Gil de Hontañón; Juan Gil de Hontañón; Juan de Álava; Juan Gil de Hontañón “el Mozo” Hernán González de Lara

Cuéllar Castle or The Castle of the Dukes of Alburquerque is the most emblematic monument in the town of Cuéllar, located in the province of Segovia, autonomous community of Castile and León, in Spain. It was declared Bien de Interés Cultural (Property of Cultural Interest) on 3 June 1931.

The castle is conserved in good condition, and it has been built in different architectural styles between the 13th and 18th century. Much of the castle in the Gothic and Renaissance styles. The military building was extended and transformed in the 16th century, turning it into the palace of the Duke of Alburquerque. During its different building stages, masters such as Juan Guas, Hanequin of Brussels and her son Hanequin de Cuéllar, Juan, Rodrigo Gil de Hontañón, and Juan Gil de Hontañón "el mozo" or Juan de Álava have worked on the castle.

Among its historical owners, stands out Álvaro de Luna and Beltrán de la Cueva, as well as the successive Dukes of Alburquerque. Distinguished guests on it were some Castilian monarchs, as Juan I and his wife the Queen Leonor de Aragón y de Sicilia, that died on it, or María de Molina, that took refuge on this castle when her Kingdom was rejecting her. Also stands out figures as the painter Francisco Javier Parcerisa, or the writer José de Espronceda, the generals Joseph Léopold Sigisbert Hugo and Arthur Wellesley, the Duke of Wellington, who set his garrison barracks in this castle during the Spanish War of Independence.

The Dukes of Alburquerque lived in this castle for centuries until they moved to Madrid to be close to the court. Thereafter they used the castle for leisure and holidays, abandoning the building slowly. In the late 19th century the castle was almost completely abandoned, and was the victim of robberies. In 1938 a political prison was created within the castle, and later a sanatorium for prisoners affected by tuberculosis. It was used as a prison until 1966.

In 1972, the Department of Fine Arts carried out an intensive restoration, and made it the home of a Vocational Education school, which continues to this day.

== Location ==
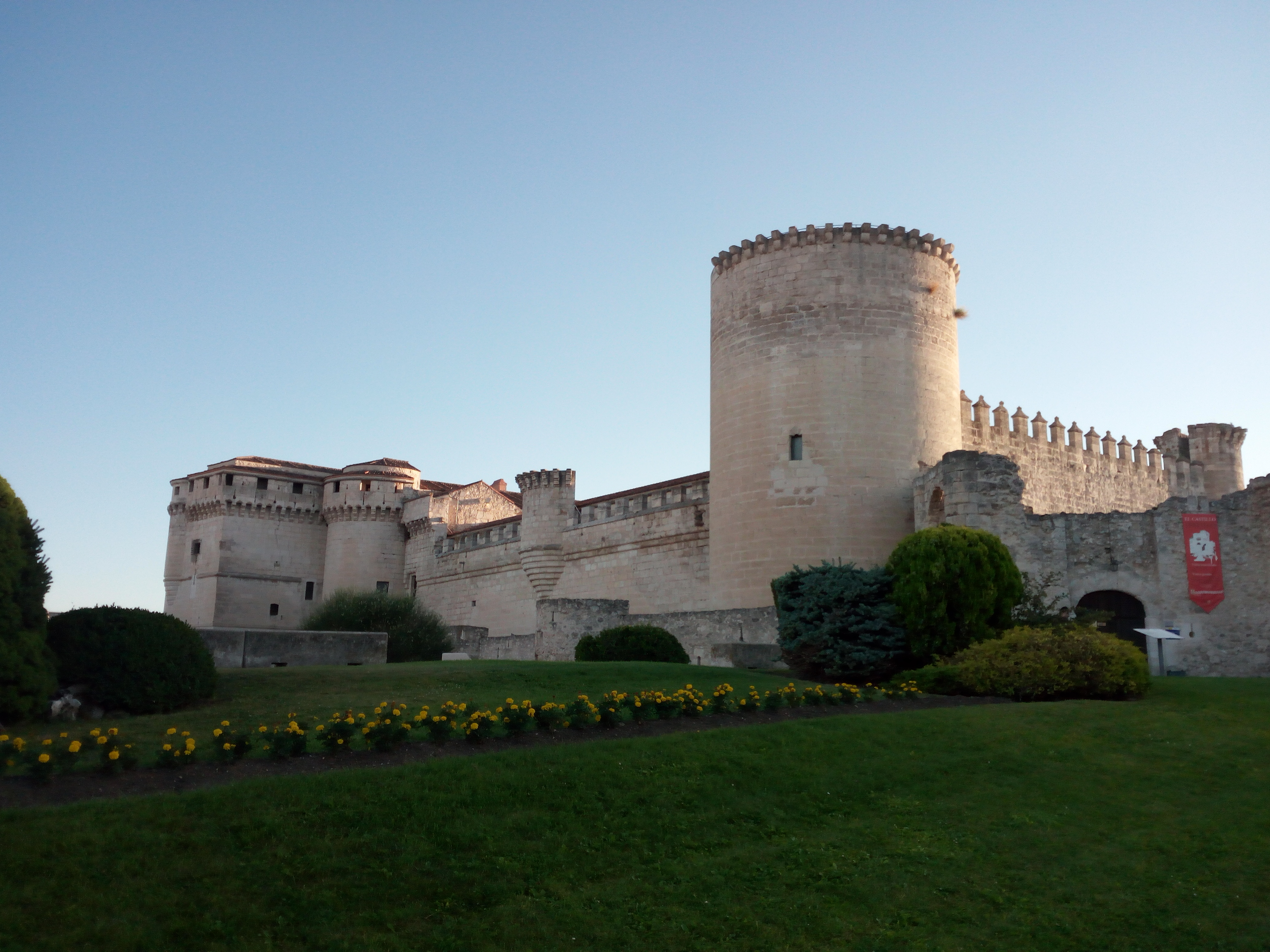
View of the walls and the castle.

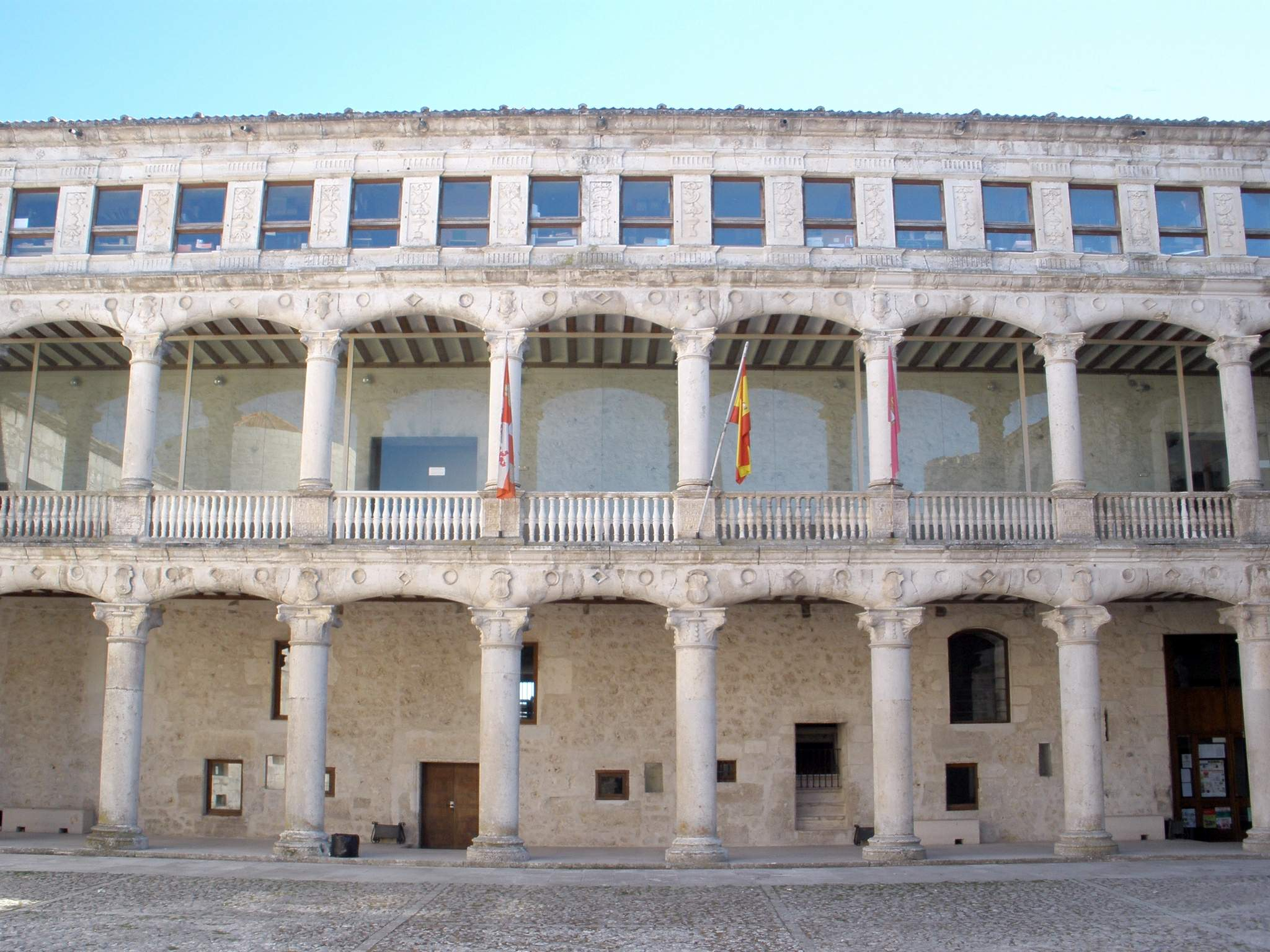
Courtyard

The castle of Cuéllar stands on the top of a hill, at the highest point of the town, above the so-called citadel and enclosing the walled enclosure. It is located at number 4 in the Plaza del Palacio, with the north and east façades bordering it; the south façade with the Huerta del Duque, and the west façade with the Camino de Santo Domingo. It has a total area of 1,025 m^{2} and its highest point is located in the keep, with a height of 20 m.

== History ==
=== First mentioning ===
It is difficult to attribute a precise date to the construction of the castle of Cuéllar. The walled enclosure already appears in documents from 1264, and it was Alfonso X the Wise who granted the council of Cuéllar the possibility of investing the proceeds of certain fines in its repair. Despite this, the remains of an 11th-century wall were found in the section of the wall on which the castle stands after restoration work. Also from an earlier period, perhaps from the late 12th or early 13th century, is the Mudejar gate located on the south façade of the castle, so that the most complete hypothesis suggests that the castle must have arisen at the same time as the walled enclosure. The first record of the castle as such dates from 1306, when on 2 October of that year Ferdinand IV granted a document from Burgos similar to that of his grandfather Alfonso X the Wise, granting the use of the proceeds from the fines to "refurbish the castle".

Nothing is known about its structure at that time, and it was not until 1403 that the infante Fernando de Antequera, lord of Cuéllar, granted a licence to the council of Cuéllar to repair the walls and the castle, the cost of which amounted to 30,000 maravedíes, paid by the residents of Cuéllar and its Land. In 1431, John II of Castile granted a privilege similar to the previous one, according to which the fines were to be for the "refurbishment of the castle walls". The same privilege alludes to another similar one granted by his father, Henry III of Castile, which has not survived to the present day. From then on, a tangled history began in the lordship of Cuéllar.

=== Álvaro de Luna ===
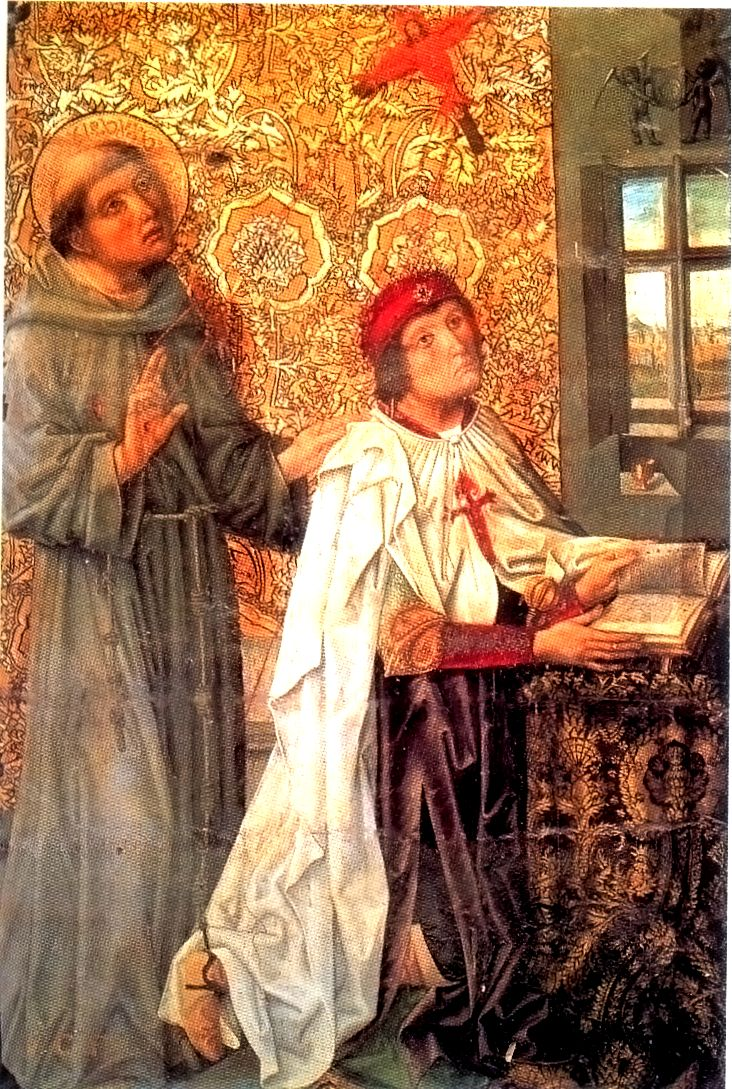
Alvaro de luna

On 23 July 1433, John II granted the town of Cuéllar to Constable Álvaro de Luna, who swore an oath of homage to its inhabitants on 3 October of the same year. The following year he still held the title of Lord of Cuéllar. Curiously, on 24 October of the same year, 1433, Don Fadrique de Luna, son of Martín I of Sicily, handed over the lordship of Cuéllar to his sister Violante de Aragón, so that there were two lords of the town at the same time. This anomaly can only have one explanation: Don Fadrique would have fallen out of favour with the king as early as July 1433 and dispossessed him of the villa, giving it to Álvaro de Luna; renegade, Don Fadrique, considering his lordship in danger, ceded it to his sister Violante, and so we find both lords at the same time.

It is possible that even then Álvaro de Luna began to plan the new fortress of Cuéllar, but he had little material time to carry it out: in 1439 he was banished from the court, and the lordship of the town was ceded by John II of Castile on 26 April of the same year to his namesake, the King of Navarre, who held it until 1444. Perhaps for this reason, because he had begun a project in Cuéllar, he again obtained the lordship of the town on 23 July 1444, taking possession of it the following year. It was then that he carried out most of his work in the castle that defended him from his enemies, as he gathered up to 300 lances in his town to fight in the revolts that preceded his execution in Valladolid. Precisely one of those twelve judges who saw the trial and condemned him to be beheaded was a cuellarano, Juan Velázquez de Cuéllar, who could not bear the remorse and had himself donated to the Monastery of Santa María de la Armedilla, ordering a wax head to be placed on his grave at his death, in memory of the one that was cut off the head of the Constable of Castile for his signature.

=== Isabella the Catholic ===
After the death of Álvaro de Luna, the lordship returned to Juan II of Castile, and in the same year that the constable died (1453), it was granted to the still Infanta of Castile, future Isabella the Catholic, who already possessed other places that eventually became part of the Community of Villa y Tierra de Cuéllar: the lordship of Montemayor. She was mistress of the town until 1464, when her half-brother Henry IV of Castile and Beltrán de la Cueva entered local history.

=== Henry IV and Beltrán de la Cueva ===
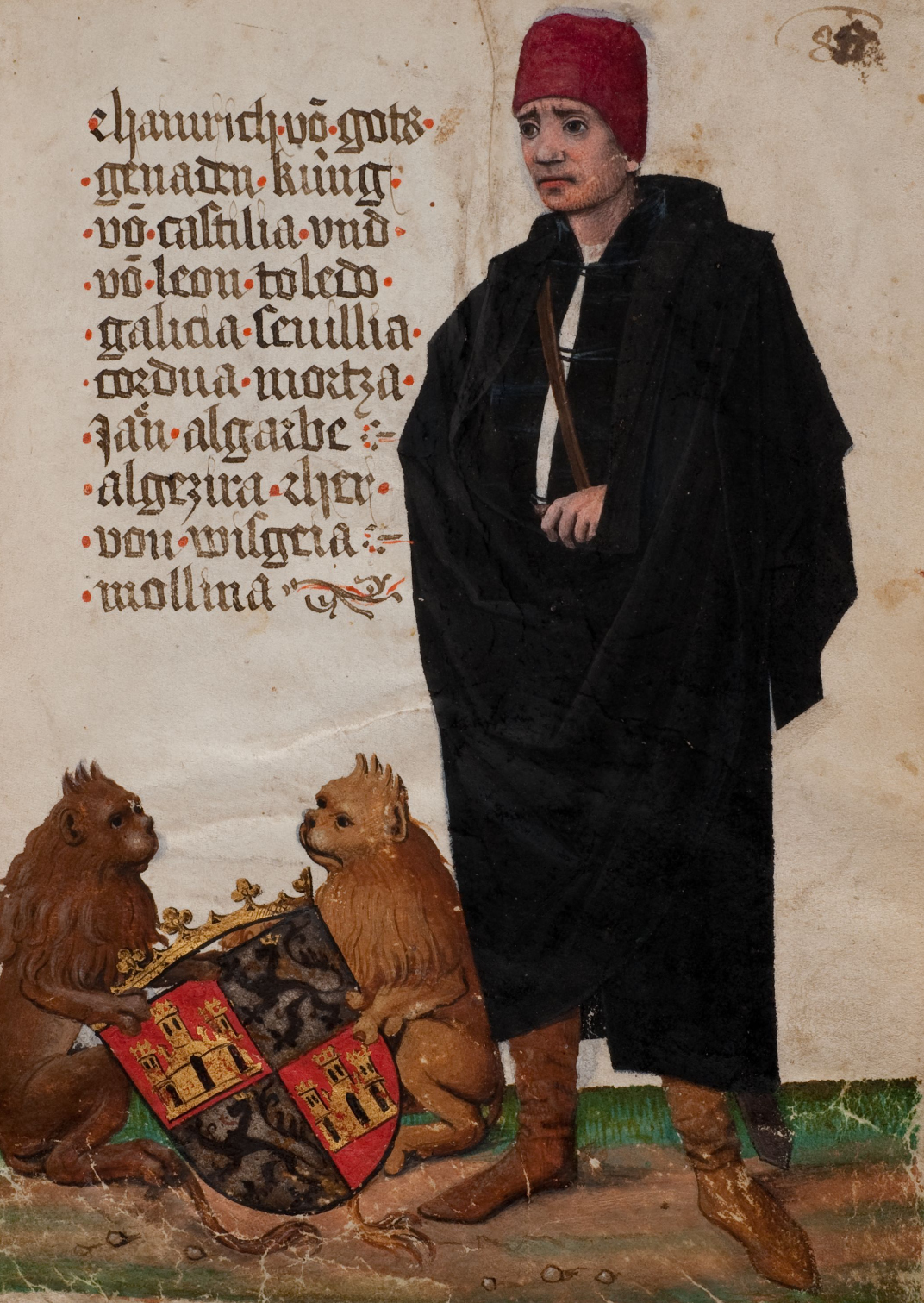
Henry IV

Henry IV, who felt a great predilection for Cuéllar, where he held the first Cortes of Castile of his reign in 1455, refused to accept his father's will, and persisted in managing the town personally, despite the fact that the manor belonged to his half-sister. Thus, on 22 July 1462, he ordered Alfonso Pérez de Segovia to give him 20,000 maravedíes each year for the tenancy of the castle, and similar deeds were issued in 1463 and 1464.7 John II bequeathed the villa to Isabella in his will, and Henry, in order to take possession of it, had to pay his half-sister 200,000 "doblas de la Banda para su dote e casamiento" (doubloons of the band for her dowry and marriage). Once in his possession, it was then that in 1464 he granted the villa to his favourite Beltrán de la Cueva, in compensation for the latter's renunciation of the Maestrazgo de Santiago, and on condition that he absented himself from the court:

Don Enrique, por la gracia de Dios, rey de Castilla [...] Por algunas causas e razones que an ello me mueven complideras a mi servicio e al pro e bien comun de mis regnos e al pacifico estado e tranquilidad dellos, e por quitar e oviar los escandalos que al presente están aparejados para se servir, por esta mi carta... vos fago merced, gracia e donación pura, perfecta e non revocable, que es dicha entre vivos, de la dicha villa de Cuéllar e su tierra con su castillo e fortaleza...[12]

Although it belonged by inheritance to the Infanta Isabella, Beltrán de la Cueva took possession of the manor in December 1464, and the Cortes of Salamanca the following year confirmed the king's grant. Perhaps for this reason, the work he carried out on the castle was based on fortifying the existing building in order to defend it in the event of an attack by the Infanta Isabella. In addition, he signed relief agreements with different members of the high nobility, with the aim of securing possession of the castle.

When Isabella ascended the throne in 1474, Beltrán de la Cueva handed her a memorial with certain petitions. In the first of these, he asked her highness to "confirm the grants he has from the Lord King Don Enrique, which God grant him of the towns of Cuéllar and Roa and Alburquerque and Mombeltrán and El Adrada and Ledesma and Huelma". The queen, together with her husband, agreed to all of Beltrán de la Cueva's requests in 1475, and King Don Fernando also managed to get his father, John II of Aragon, to cede to Don Beltrán all the rights he might have to the town in 1476:

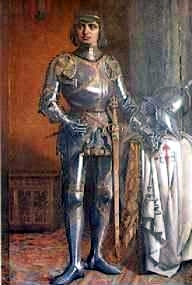
Beltran de la Cueva

...Acatando e considerando los muchos e buenos e leales servicios que con toda lealtad e fidelidad vos avedes fecho e facedes de cada dia al mi muy caro e muy amado fijo primogenito Don Fernando Rey de Castilla.... I grant you, the said Duke of Alburquerque, a mercy, grace, perpetual and non-revocable donation of all the right and action that I have and have and belong to me and that may and must belong to me in any way and by any title and title and reason that may be, to the towns of Cuellar and Roa, and to their fortresses and vassals. ... and I give, transfer and renounce it all to you, the said Duke of Alburquerque and to your heirs and successors.... Mª Rosario Mondéjar Manzanares

Beltrán de la Cueva went from fearing a possible attack by Isabella to being well regarded at her court. He undoubtedly gained royal favour for having fought against the Portuguese defending the Queen's rights at the Battle of Toro on 1 March 1476, in the context of the War of the Castilian Succession. From that time until 1811, due to the abolition of the lordships, the town remained in the hands of the Ducal House, and the works begun by Beltrán de la Cueva were continued by the second, third and fourth dukes, converting the military fortress into a Renaissance palace, where they had their residence until the 17th century, when they moved with the Court to Madrid, where it became their summer residence and a place for family celebrations.

This marked the beginning of a dark period for the monument, which, frequented occasionally and without specific use, deteriorated over the years, and the scarce news that we have of this period reiterate the collapse of the roofs and other details that the dukes always restored, although without showing any special interest in their conservation or in all the works of art stored there, among which were important gold and silver tableware, a well-known armoury and various canvases by renowned painters.

=== 19th century ===
==== War of Independence ====
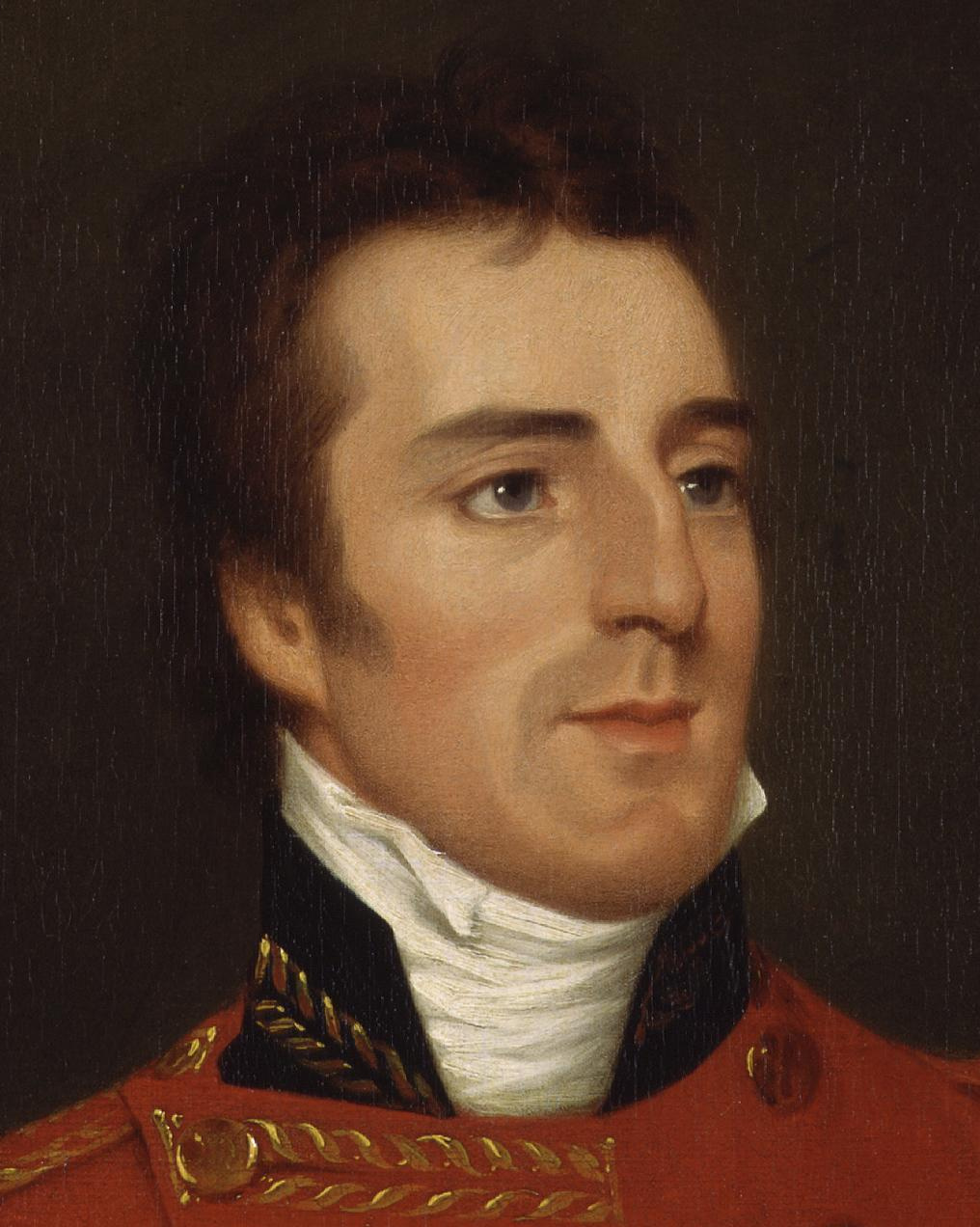
Arthur Wellesley, 1st Duke of Wellington by Robert Home cropped

Because of its geographical location, halfway between Segovia and Valladolid, and the existence of the castle, the Villa played a role of some importance during the War of Independence, and the fortress a place coveted by the French. As they did with other monuments in Cuéllar, such as the convents of San Francisco and La Trinidad or the church of San Pedro, the castle also fell victim to the theft and destruction of the French. On 28 February 1808, the first French soldiers arrived, settled in the house of one of the noble families of Cuéllar and were fed and cared for by the population. Shortly afterwards, the Segovia Artillery Academy and General Gregorio García de la Cuesta from Valladolid took up arms against the French. The Duke's administrator, complying with orders from Segovia, sent all the firearms stored in the castle, for which four wagons were necessary.

In 1812 General Arthur Wellesley, Lord Wellington, arrived in Cuéllar with a large number of soldiers. His arrival in Cuéllar must have been a shocking one: on 1 August 1812, the cavalry and infantry soldiers, victorious at the Battle of Arapiles, were seen crossing the municipality of San Cristóbal de Cuéllar, as they paraded to the sound of trumpets in the direction of the town, the display lasting from seven o'clock until eleven o'clock in the morning. The parish priest of the municipality, a witness and reporter, had to shelter an English captain and his wife, and claims that Wellington rode past, "smilingly reciprocating the greetings of the crowd". After offering lunch to the commanding officers, the army made its way to Cuéllar, where they stayed for at least six days.

On 7 January 1813, the French returned and broke down the door of the monastery of Santa Clara and beat up the chaplain and sacristan of the church. The castle was also destroyed: they lit a bonfire fuelled by the castle furniture and continued the plundering begun by their compatriots the previous year. In May of the same year, just as the battlefield was being withdrawn, General Hugo (father of the literati Eugène, Abel and Victor Hugo) arrived in Cuéllar and stayed in the castle, accompanied by his convoy, where they rested for a night. They were looked after by the population with abundant food, good bedding and fodder, but in view of the danger of the guerrillas, they left Cuéllar in the direction of Tudela de Duero.

== Gallery ==
Homage Tower, door, foss with the falsabraga (curtain wall) and the entrance.

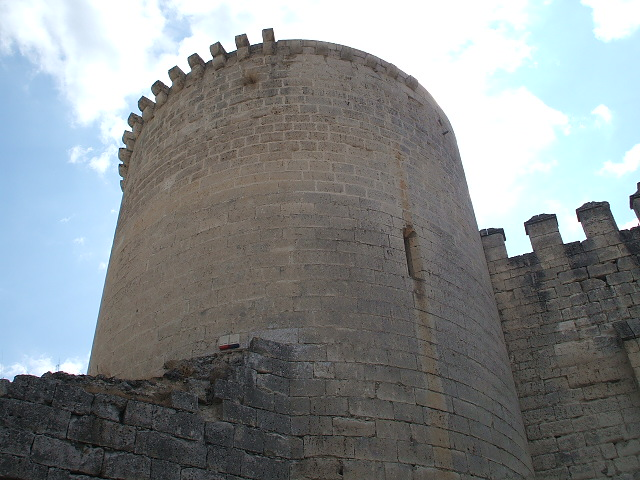

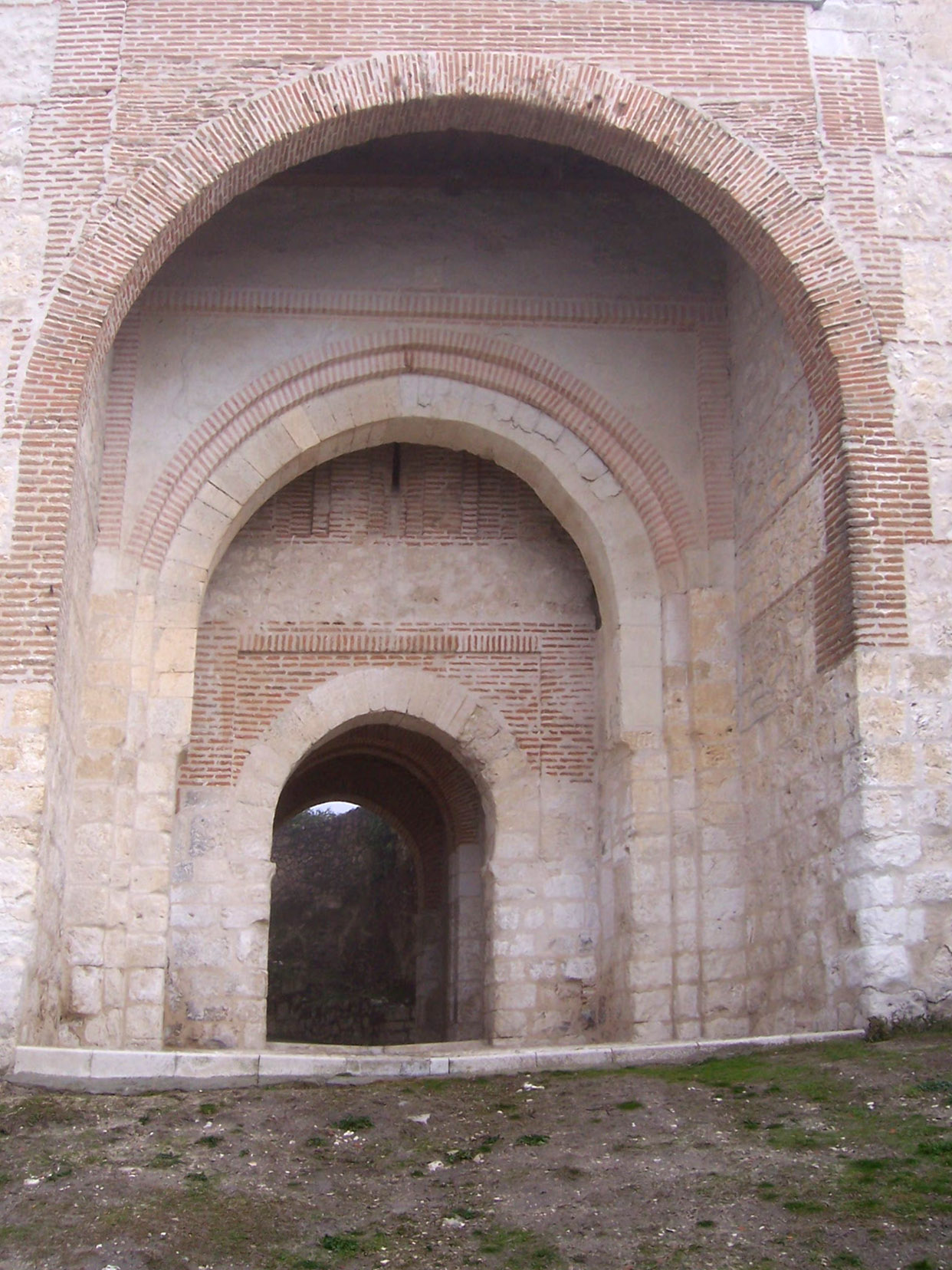

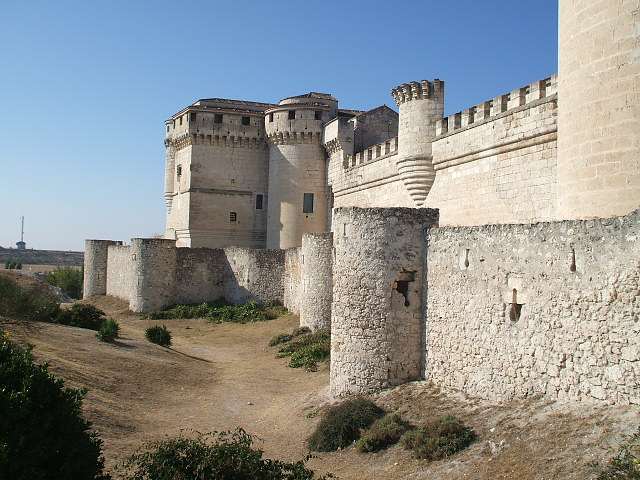

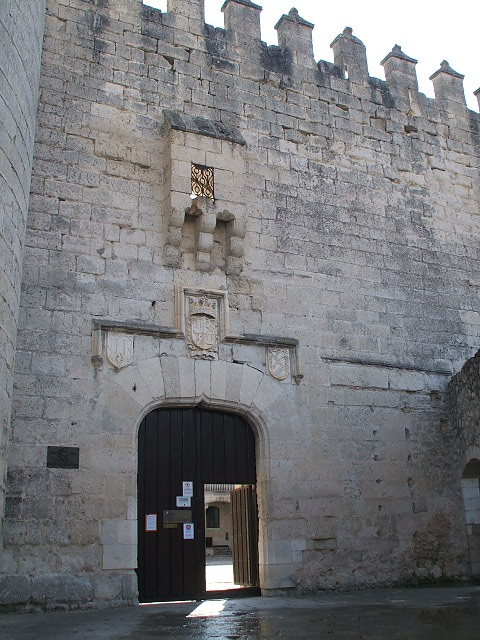

== Bibliography ==
- MONDÉJAR MANZANARES, Mª Rosario (2007). Apuntes para la interpretación de un castillo: el castillo de Cuéllar. Segovia. ISBN 978-84-612-1200-2
- VELASCO BAYÓN (O. CARM), Balbino (1996). Historia de Cuéllar (Cuarta edición edición). Segovia. ISBN 84-500-4620-3
- MONTERO PADILLA, José: Espronceda en Cuéllar, Estudios segovianos (Instituto Diego de Colmenares del Consejo Superior de Investigaciones Científicas), Segovia, 1973, Tomo XXV, n.º 74-75.
- GÓMEZ SANTOS, Antonio: Cárceles famosas y Prisioneros célebres en la Segovia de los siglos XVI, XVII, XVIII y XIX, Estudios segovianos (Instituto Diego de Colmenares del Consejo Superior de Investigaciones Científicas), Segovia, 1973, Tomo XXV, n.º 74-75.
- FERNÁNDEZ DURO, Cesáreo: Don Francisco Fernández de la Cueva, Duque de Alburquerque. Informe presentado a la Real Academia de la Historia, Madrid, 1884.
- PONZ, Antonio: Viage de España..., Tomo XI, Madrid, 1783.
- VELASCO BAYÓN (O. CARM), Balbino: Pueblos de España - Segovia - Cuéllar, Madrid, 2008. ISBN 978-84-935685-4-2
- UBIETO ARTETA, Antonio: Colección Diplomática de Cuéllar, Exma. Diputación Provincial de Segovia, Segovia, 1961.
- LARIOS MARTÍN, Jesús: Nobiliario de Segovia, Instituto Diego de Colmenares (Consejo Superior de Investigaciones Científicas), Tomo I, Segovia, 1959.
- CARMONA PIDAL, Juan Antonio: Pervivencias y estancamiento de una fortuna aristocrática en la Restauración. La Casa de Alcañices (1869-1909), Revista Espacio, Tiempo y Forma, Serie V: Historia Contemporánea, vol. 3
- ARRANZ, Carlos; CARRICAJO, Carlos y FRAILE, Ángel: Cuéllar: un molino de viento en la época de los Reyes Católicos , Revista de Folklore (Fundación Joaquín Díaz), vol. 14b, n.º 166.
