= The Sky of Salamanca =

1480s mural painting

The Sky of Salamanca ( Spanish: El Cielo de Salamanca) is a mural painting attributed to Fernando Gallego that corresponds to the third part of the decoration of the vault of the old Library of the Major Schools of the University of Salamanca. The original vault was painted in the 1480s and occupied the upper part of the current chapel of San Jerónimo. In the middle of the 18th century, the height of the nave used for the chapel was increased, leaving the painting hidden in a chamber of about four meters between the roof of the building and the new vault of the chapel. In these works, the other two thirds of the old vault in which the painting was located collapsed. In 1901 they were rediscovered by Professor García Boiza. In the 1950s the paintings were removed from the original vault, transferred to canvas and moved to their current location (University Museum in the Minor Schools) for contemplation.

The painting is an astrological representation (signs, constellations the Sun and Mercury) following the iconography of the Poeticon Astronomicon. It was inspired by the chair of astrology that had recently been established (c. 1460) at the University of Salamanca. In the original vault, the planets the Sun and the Moon were represented in their houses although this cannot be confirmed since only one-third of the original vault is preserved.
