= Ávila Cathedral =

Roman Catholic church in Ávila, Spain

- Cathedral of the Saviour
- Catedral del Salvador
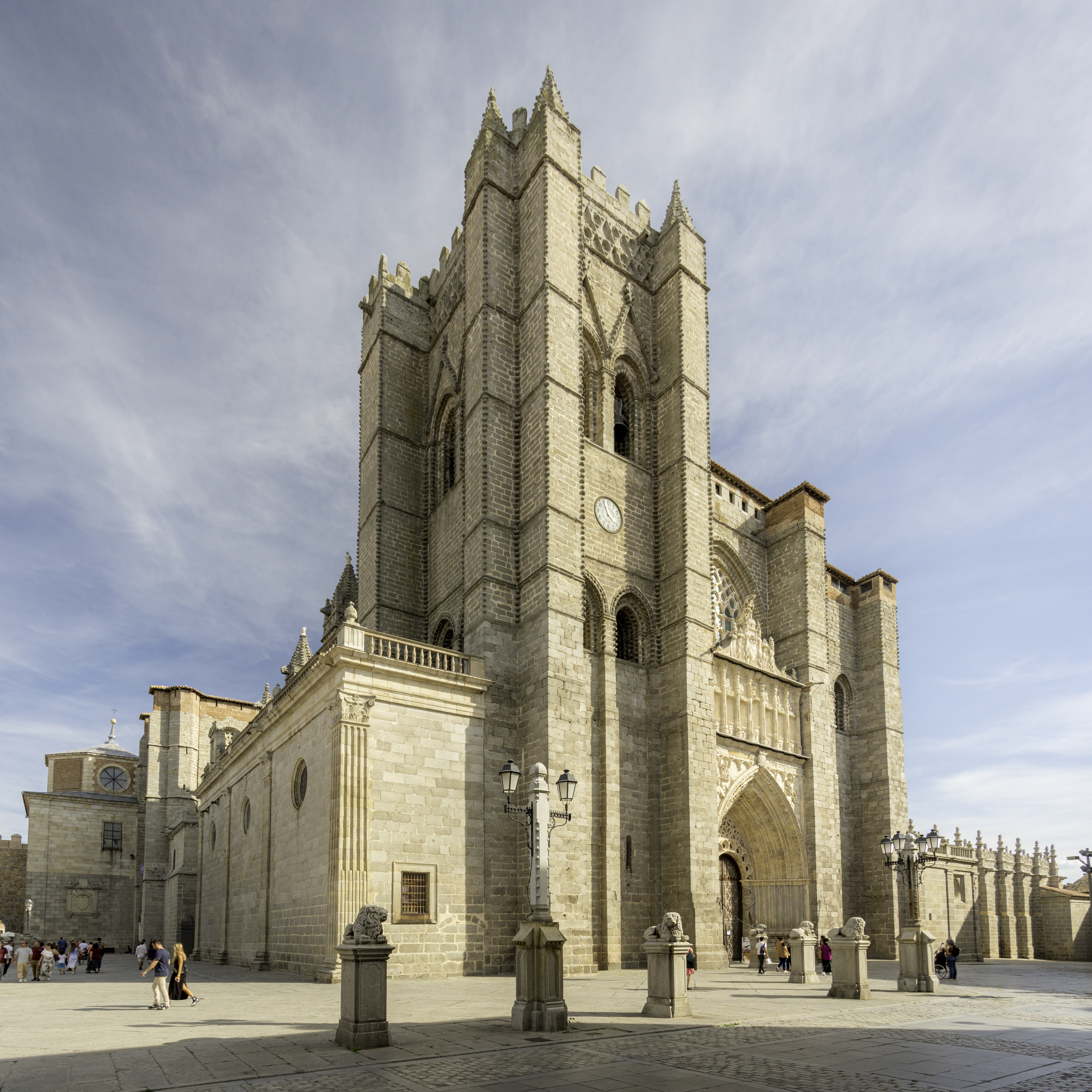
- West façade in 2023.
- Ávila Cathedral
- 40.6558°N 4.6972°W
- Location: Ávila
- Address: 8, Plaza de la Catedral
- Country: Spain
- Denomination: Catholic
- Website: catedralavila.com

History
- Status: Cathedral
- Dedication: Salvator Mundi

Architecture
- Architect: Giral Fruchel
- Style: Gothic
- Groundbreaking: 1170

Specifications
- Length: 85 m (278 ft 10 in)
- Width: 42.5 m (139 ft 5 in)

Administration
- Metropolis: Valladolid
- Diocese: Ávila

Clergy
- Bishop: Jesús Rico García

UNESCO World Heritage Site
- Criteria: Cultural: (iii), (iv)
- Designated: 1985 (2nd session)
- Part of: Old Town of Ávila with its Extra-Muros Churches
- Reference no.: 348bis

Spanish Cultural Heritage
- Type: Non-movable
- Criteria: Monument
- Designated: 31 October 1914
- Reference no.: RI-51-0000138

The Cathedral of the Saviour (Spanish: Catedral de Cristo Salvador) is a Catholic church in Ávila in the south of Old Castile, Spain. It was built in the late Romanesque and Gothic architectural traditions.

It was planned as a cathedral-fortress, with its apse forming one of the turrets of the city walls. It is surrounded by a number of houses or palaces, the most important being: the Palace of the Veladas, the Palace of the Infant King (Rey Niño), and the Palace of Valderrábanos, which were responsible for the defence of the Puerta de los Leales ("The Gate of the Loyal Ones") also known as La Puerta del Peso de la Harina ("The Flour Weigh Gate").

== History ==
It is not known exactly when the construction of the cathedral began. Two theories exist. One states that Alvar García started its construction in 1091 inside the remains of a previous Romanesque Church of the Saviour, which was left in ruins as a result of successive Muslim attacks, and that Alfonso VII of Castile raised the money necessary to build it. Other historians believe the cathedral to be the work of the maestro Fruchel in the 12th century coinciding with the repopulation of Castille led by Raymond of Burgundy.

== Characteristics ==
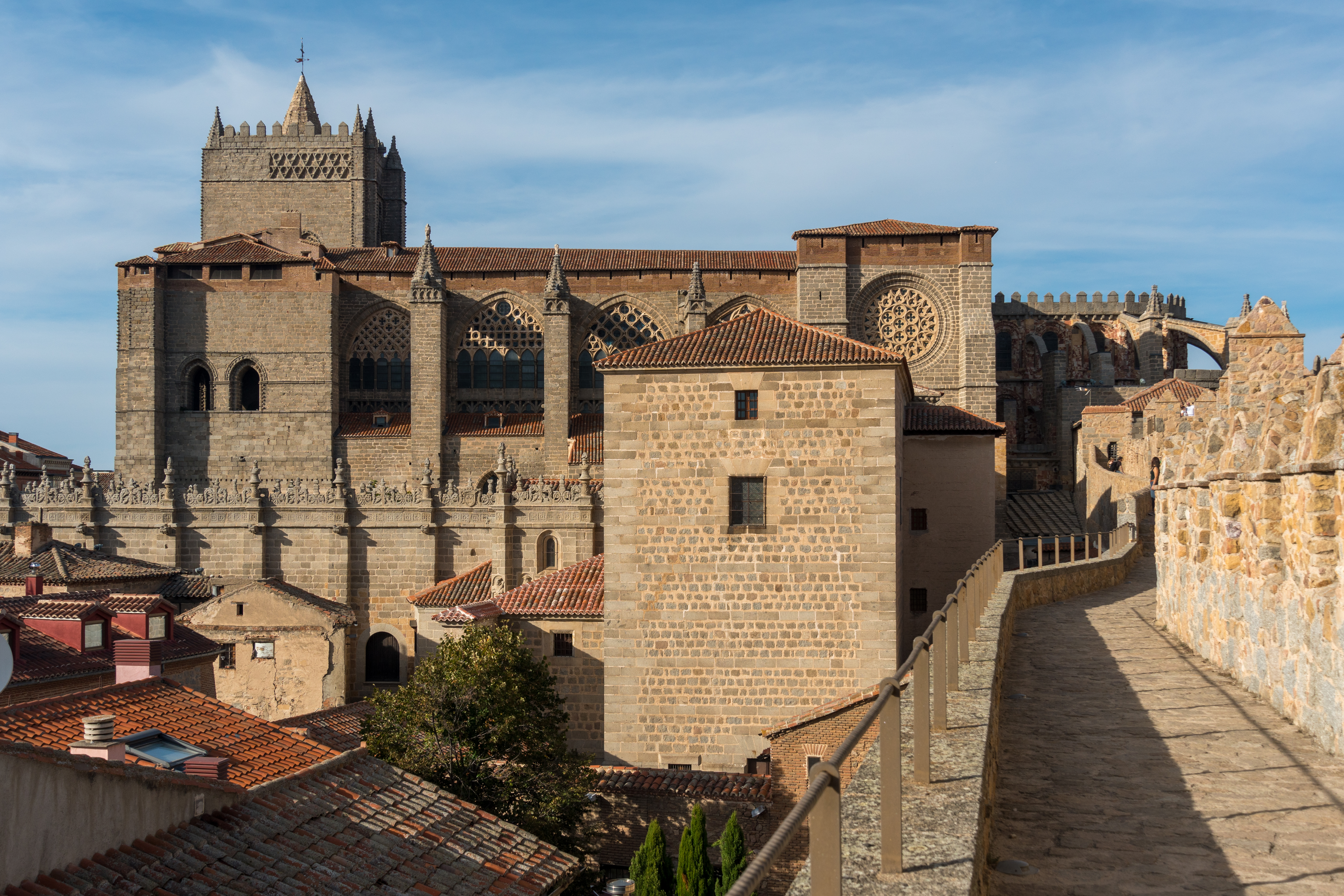
South view from the medieval walls.

The Cathedral of Ávila is considered by its age (12th century), along with the Cathedral of Cuenca, as the first two Gothic cathedrals in Spain. It predates other important Spanish Gothic cathedrals, such as the Cathedral of Burgos (1222–1260) and the Cathedral of León (started about 1255).

The cathedral shows French influences and great resemblances to the Abbey Church of St Denis, the first European Gothic church. The construction was started by Girald Fruchel in the 12th century. This construction was continued and modified until the 17th century, going from Gothic architecture to Classicism (Saint Secundus chapel) and finally Baroque architecture (Velada Chapel).

The first stages of the towers and the aisles date from the 13th century, alongside the second stage of the towers (one remaining unfinished), the cloister, the vaults and the flying buttresses date from the following century. Already in the fifteenth century all the works on the cathedral were complete and, in 1475, Juan Guas built the mechanical clock, in addition to moving the western portal to the north side.

The belfry includes a residence for the bell-ringer's family. It was used until the 1950s. A pulley and rope eased the hoisting of provisions and the downloading of refuse.

== Interior ==
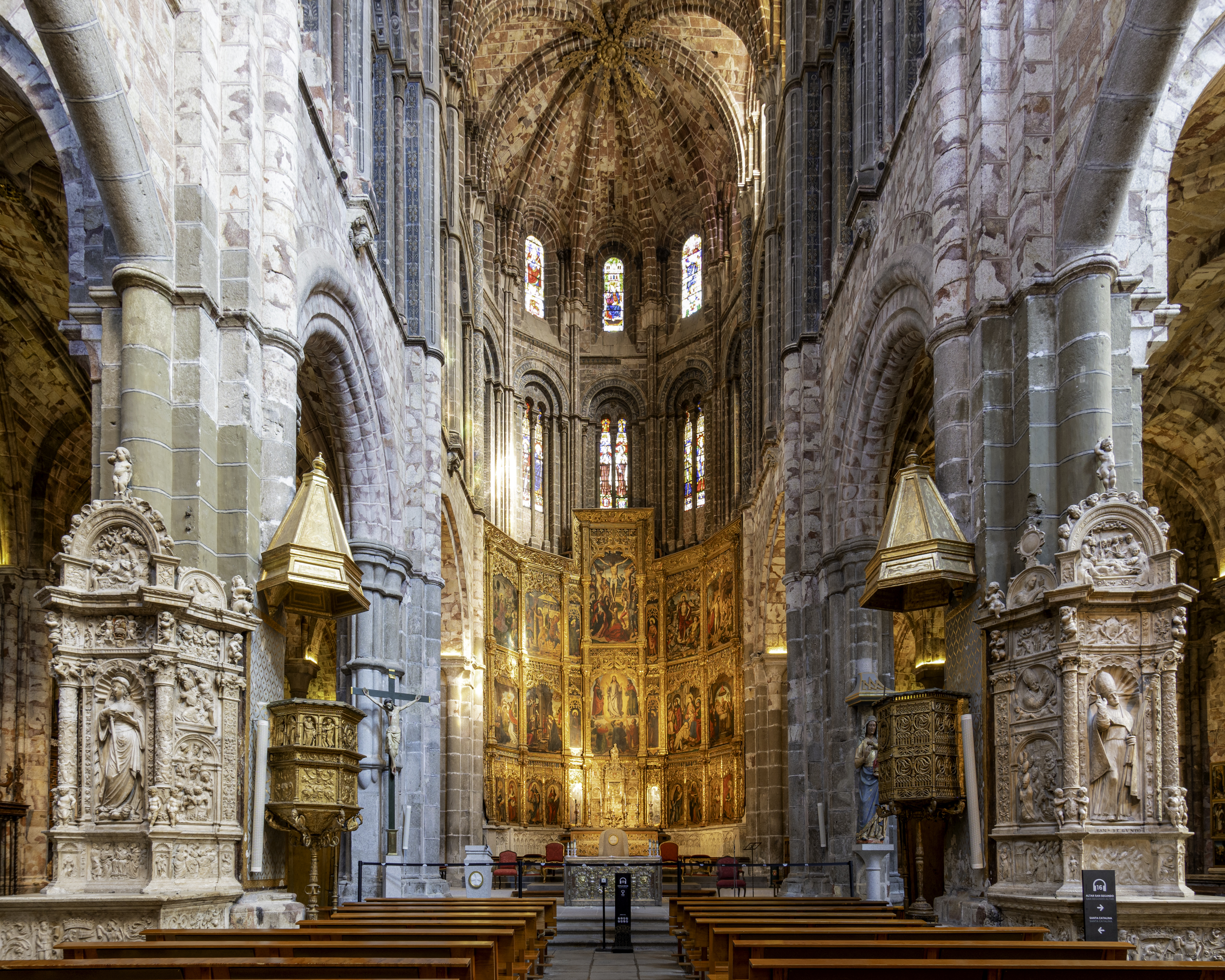
Panorama of the central nave.

The cathedral consists of a central nave and two aisles with a wide transept. They are of equal width but the central one is notably higher and it opens with large windows to the outside. They are separated by fine columns and pointed arches, which give this space a feeling of lightness and clarity. The vaults are mostly of simple quadripartite ribbing.

The alabaster baptismal font (1514–1516) is the work of Vasco de la Zarza.

The thick wall of the ambulatory of the apse is embedded in the solid, fortified wall surrounding the city. A retrochoir divides the central nave from the transept, the choir and the apse.

The plateresque retrochoir was intricately decorated with high-reliefs by Lucas Giraldo and Juan Rodríguez. They show in great detail and with naturalism five scenes from the childhood of Jesus. In the Epiphany, Balthasar is highlighted in black.

The walnut choir stalls (with a misericord), behind the retrochoir, are aligned with the side of the church. They date from the first half of the 16th century. The work was carried out by the Flemish sculptor Cornielles de Holanda with the participation of Lucas Giraldo, Juan Rodríguez and Isidro Villoldo.

The transept contains the alabaster altars of Saint Secundus (patron saint of Ávila) and Saint Catherine, both made by Vasco de la Zarza in the first half of the 16th century. The altar of Saint Secundus was completed by Isidro Villoldo, while the altar of Saint Catherine was completed by Lucas Giraldo and Juan Rodríguez.

The enormous altarpiece of the main altar was begun by Pedro Berruguete in the transition from the 15th to the 16th century. He carried out eight predellas portraying in detail and naturalism images of Evangelists and Doctors of the Church, as well as two boards portraying the "Prayer in the Garden" and the "Flagellation". These paintings, perhaps reflecting the prevailing style in Castile at the time, use gold backgrounds and somewhat rigid compositions. After his death, his assistant, Bartolomé de Santa Cruz, continued the work with "the Crucifixion", "the Resurrection" and the "Epiphany". The rest of the scenes were carried out by Juan de Borgoña.

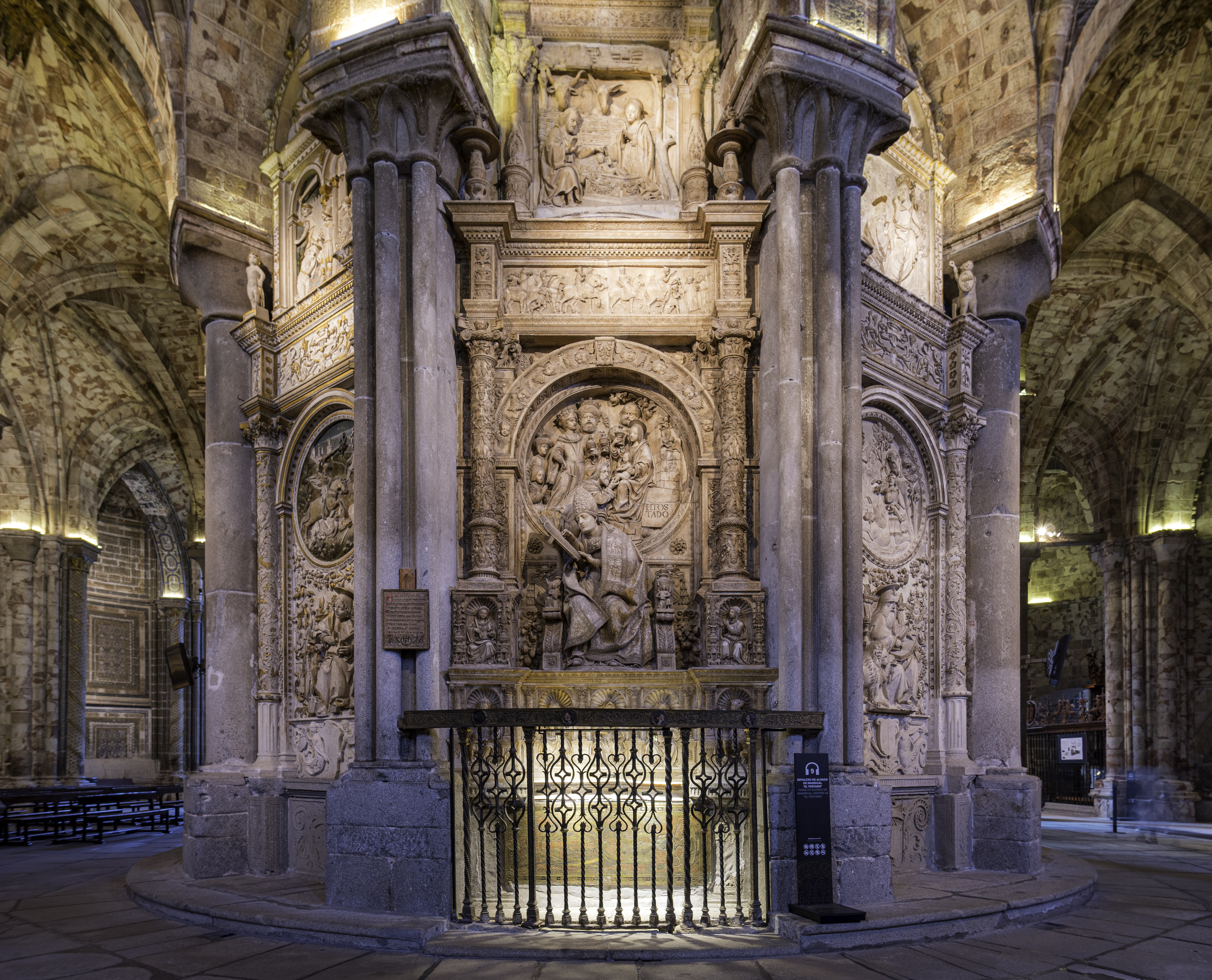
Ambulatory.

The ambulatory is surrounded with a triforium. It contains nine side chapels and five large, richly decorated panels with reliefs (attributed to Lucas Giraldo and Vasco de la Zarza). The middle panel is an alabaster piece, with a wealth of detail and structured like a retable, by Vasco de la Zarza and accommodates the tomb of Alonso de Madrigal, also named "El Tostado", a bishop of Ávila.

The cathedral museum, located in the sacristies, houses a large number of works of art, among which the portrait of the knight Don Garci Báñez de Muxica by El Greco and the chalice and paten of Saint Secundus. However, its most notable work is the enormous processional monstrance (1571), a shrine in six bodies by the goldsmith Juan de Arphe y Villafañe. Its main theme is the "Sacrifice of Isaac".

In 2014 Spanish former prime minister Adolfo Suárez and his wife were buried inside.
