= Fernando Gallego =

Spanish painter

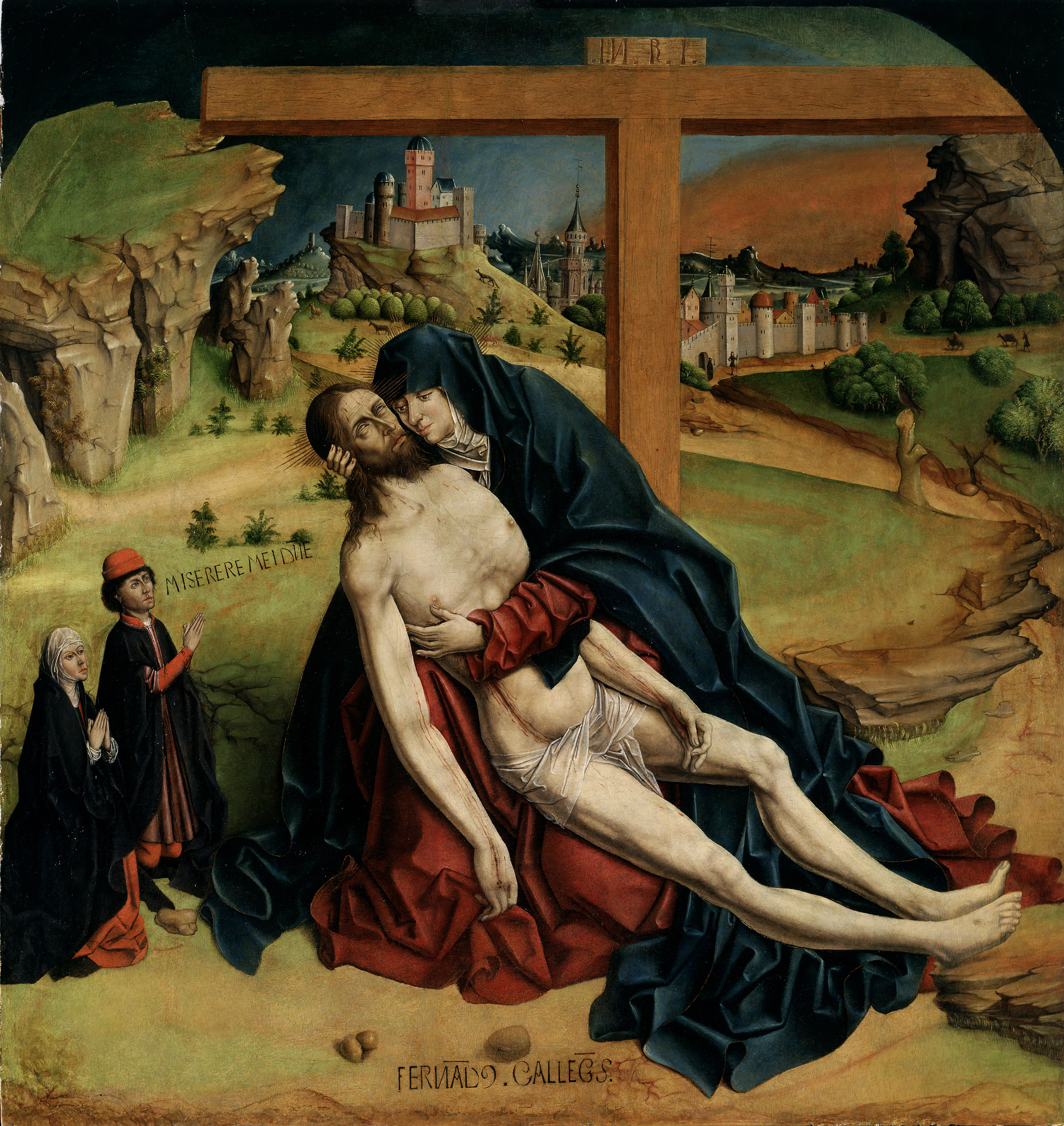
Fernando Gallego, Pietà, Prado Museum

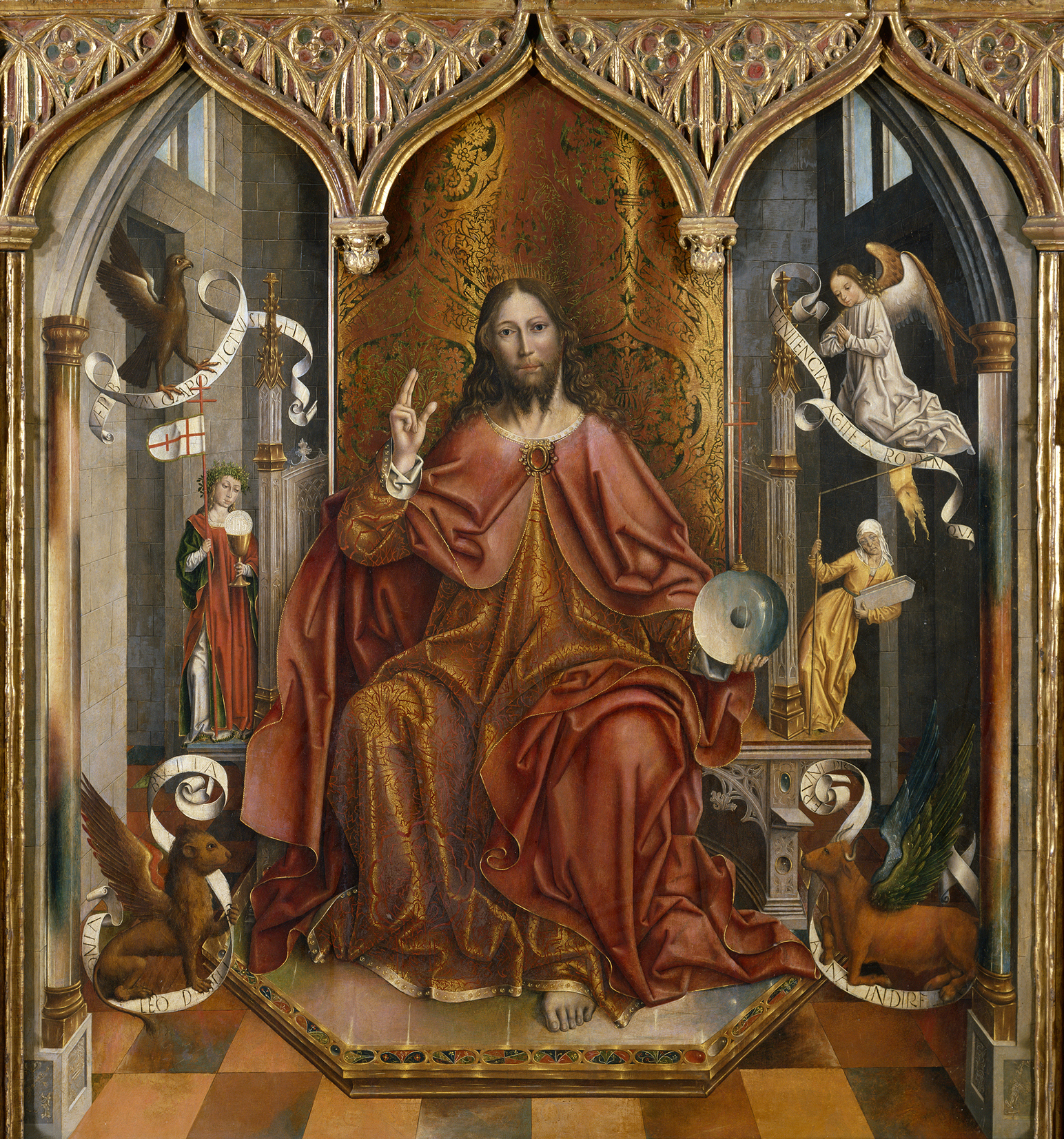
Fernando Gallego, Blessing Christ, Museo del Prado

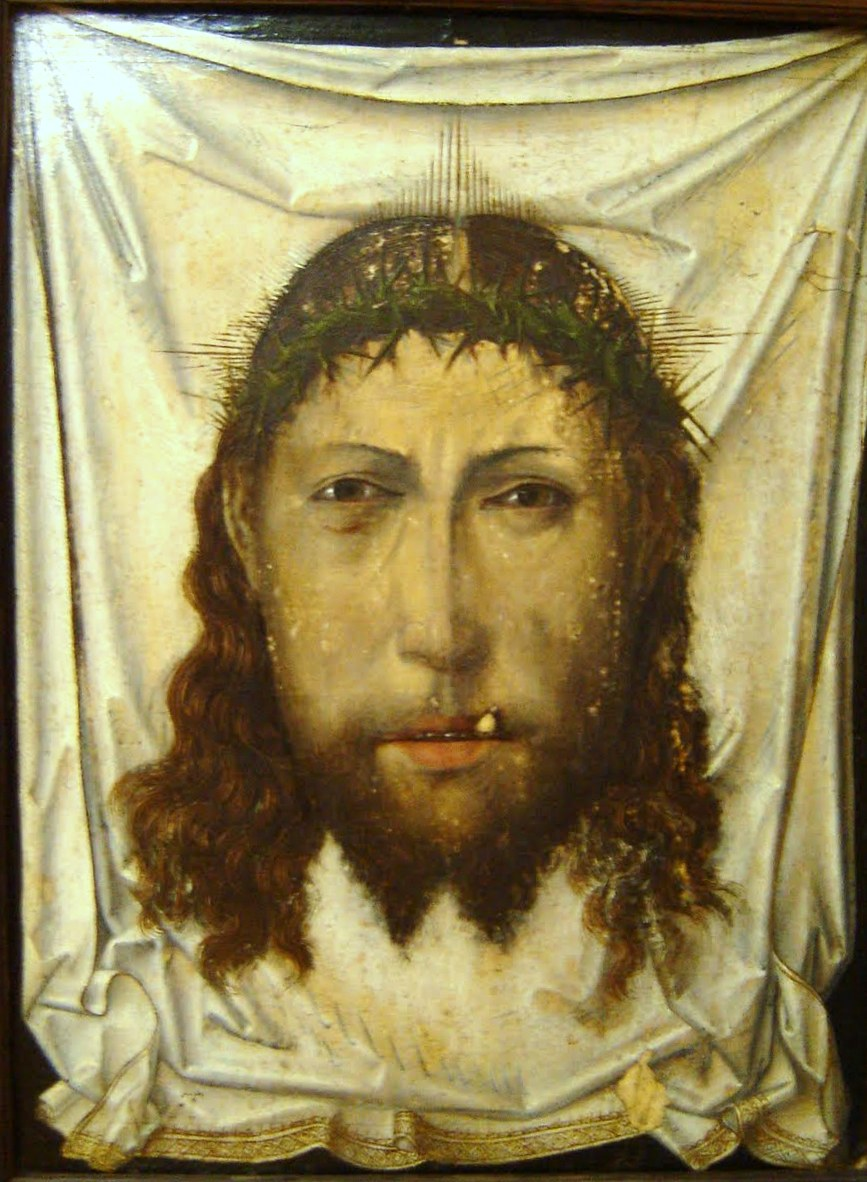
Holy Face, attributed to a 15th-century Flemish or Spanish painter. Paul Coremans believes the author is Fernando Gallego.

Fernando Gallego (c. 1440 – 1507) was a Castilian painter, and his art is generally regarded as Hispano-Flemish in style. Gallego was likely born in Salamanca, Spain, and worked throughout Castile and Extremadura, most notably in Ciudad Rodrigo, Plasencia, Toro, and Zamora.

Much of his biography has been traced through attributions of his work, but few details are known. The last time he was referred to in a document which implied he was still alive was in 1507, but the date of his death is unknown.

Some works thought to be Fernando Gallego's are likely instead Francisco Gallego's, such as San Acacius and the 10,000 Martyrs and the Getty Museum's Pietà. Francisco is known to have worked in Fernando's workshop, but their relationship is unknown.

== Style and subject matter ==
Nothing definite is known about Gallego's artistic training, but his naturalistic handling of form and technical style strongly link him to Flemish painting, especially the artist Rogier van der Weyden. Early Netherlandish painting of the 15th century was one of the dominant artistic styles, and was significant for its vivid illusionism and its complex iconography, both of which are evident in Gallego's work.

His mastery of form and composition, as well as his creativity, single him out as one of Spain's preeminent painters during this time. He took stylistic liberty in many of his works and painstakingly individualized the figures within them, which enhances dramatic appeal of the religious narrative while emphasizing his technical prowess. Much of his work was painted with oil on panel, although he did work with tempera early on. He worked with Master Bartolomé, another painter in Spain, on the Retablo of Ciudad Rodrigo, a tour de force of religious art, depicting Christian history from the Creation to the Last Judgment.

The majority of his work consists of small panels of religious scenes, often used to comprise altarpieces, or retablos. One notable exception is The Sky of Salamanca, located at the University of Salamanca, a vast ceiling mural which depicts astronomical scenes and constellations. Only three of Gallego's works are signed, Retablo of San Ildefonso, the Prado's Pietà, and Virgin of the Rose triptych. Other works have been attributed to him on the basis of style or through historical documents naming him on contracts.

== Discussion of major works ==
=== Retablo of Ciudad Rodrigo (University of Arizona Museum of Art) ===
The panels from this massive altarpiece, painted between 1480 and 1500, have been attributed to the workshops of Fernando Gallego and Master Bartolomé. Its original orientation and dimensions are not known, as it was likely added to after its installation. It was moved and fell into disrepair by the early 19th century. The panels were subsequently removed from their original frames and split up; twenty-three narrative panels were sent to London in the 1880s. Some scholars claim there may have been upwards of forty-two narrative panels, but since the apse in the cathedral was remodeled in 1502, the size of the space the altarpiece filled is up for debate. There are twenty-six panels in the Kress Collection at the University of Arizona Museum of Art (acquired 1957), and scholars believe that the panels were almost equally split between Gallego and Bartolomé.

Among the panels attributed to the workshop of Gallego, three are from the predella, and eleven from the main altarpiece. They include:

- Predella: St. Andrew and St. Peter, St. Bartholomew and St. John the Evangelist, St. Mark and St. Thomas.
- Altarpiece: The Circumcision, The Charge to Peter, Pilate Washing His Hands, Ecce Homo, Christ and the Samaritan Woman, The Raising of Lazarus, The Agony in the Garden, The Betrayal of Christ, The Healing of the Blind Bartimaeus, Changing the Water into Wine, The Last Judgment.

Although Gallego did not sign this work, there is a document from 1486 which lists him on the tax roll for Ciudad Rodrigo. This in addition to the stylistic attribution lead scholars to believe Gallego and his workshop played a significant role in producing the panels for the altarpiece.

A detailed discussion of these pieces and the science behind the scholarship can be found in the book Fernando Gallego and His Workshop: The Altarpiece from Ciudad Rodrigo, published by the Meadows Museum at SMU. At least two other important, modern studies of Gallego and this Retablo have been published.

- In 1961 Robert M. Quinn wrote Fernando Gallego and the Retablo of Ciudad Rodrigo. This text was accompanied by a Spanish translation by Renato Rosaldo. The study, which is illustrated with full page reproductions in monochrome, was published by The University of Arizona Press.
- A major study of the Altarpiece of Ciudad Rodrigo was published in 2008. The publication and study includes research about the provenance, style, historical context of fifteenth-century Castile, and the role that printmaking played in production of the altarpiece. The final chapter discusses studies made through infrared reflectography and undertaken at the Kimbell Art Museum's Conservation Studio in Fort Worth, which allowed scholars to analyze the theory that two different workshops created the panels; it also served as a case study of fifteenth-century Castilian artistic practice.

=== Retablo of San Ildefonso (Cathedral of Zamora) ===
This work is not dated, so scholars have proposed various dates. It was traditionally considered to have been painted in 1456, when the founder of the chapel received cardinalship, but as late a date as 1467 has also been proposed. This is the oldest of Gallego's retablos. It consists of two main parts arranged with three panels each, a five-figured banco (predella), and two side guardapolvo (angled dust covers). The six main panels represent, from left to right and top to bottom: Baptism of Jesus, Christ on the Cross at Calvary, Martyrdom of John the Baptist, Apparition of Saint Leocadia, San Ildefonso (Saint Ildephonsus) Receiving the Chasuble from the Virgin, and Veneration of the Relics of San Ildefonso. The predella shows, left to right: Saint John the Evangelist, Saint Nicolas de Bari, Saint Peter, The Holy Face, Saint Jerome, and Saint James. The guardapolvo represent Eve and Adam on the top and allegories of the Church and Synagogue beneath. Between the panels show the coat of arms of the Cardinal.

The altarpiece was most recently restored by the Central Institute of Restoration in Madrid between 1966 and 1976. Later overpainting was removed; and although the panels are in relatively good condition, significant portions of the two middle panels (Christ on the Cross and San Ildefonso Receiving the Chasuble) are damaged.

=== The Sky of Salamanca (El Cielo de Salamanca) (University of Salamanca) ===
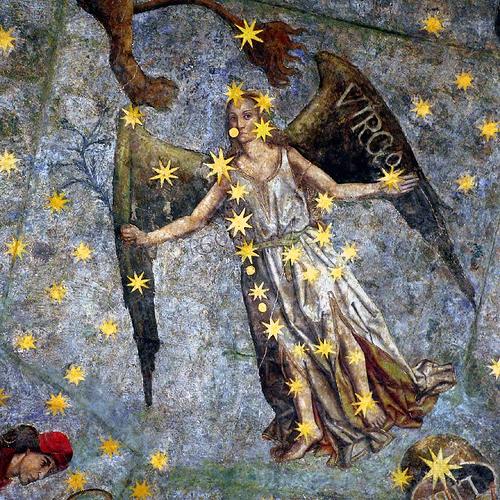
Virgo from The Sky of Salamanca

There are no contracts proving that the mural project The Sky of Salamanca is definitively Fernando Gallego's. However, there is documentation from the rector Rodrigo Alvarez, requesting Fernando Gallego be hired to paint the library, since he had already worked for the cathedral on the Virgin of the Rose triptych. Documents also mention him by name in relation to the painting of the library coffers. The Sky of Salamanca is located in the University of Salamanca's library ceiling. It is an astrological representation of the planets and zodiacal signs.

=== Pietà (La Piedad) (Prado Museum, Madrid) ===
Depictions of the pietà came to prominence during the end of the 15th century. Gallego's version is a rather straightforward and uncluttered composition. Mary cradling the body of Christ is prominently placed in the center of the panel with the cross above them. The only other figures are small representations of the unknown donors. One of them is praying, “m iserere mei due,” a prayer from Psalms spoken on Holy Saturday. A landscape with city scene is evident in the background, likely depicting Jerusalem. This, like other pietàs would have been a purely devotional image, meant for religious contemplation.

=== Virgin of the Rose (Triptych de la Virgen de la Rosa) (Cathedral of Salamanca Museum) ===
Virgin of the Roses is a small altarpiece with three panels. It has been restored and reframed, so the original orientation of the panels is unknown. Due to its small size, it was likely placed in the cloisters of the Salamanca Cathedral, possibly over a tomb. The three shields on the triptych now contain symbols of the saints beneath them (rose bush for the Virgin Mary, tree for Saint Andrew, laurel branch for Saint Christopher), however they have been repainted to cover over the original familial coats of arms. Gallego's signature is plainly visible beneath the Virgin's robes.

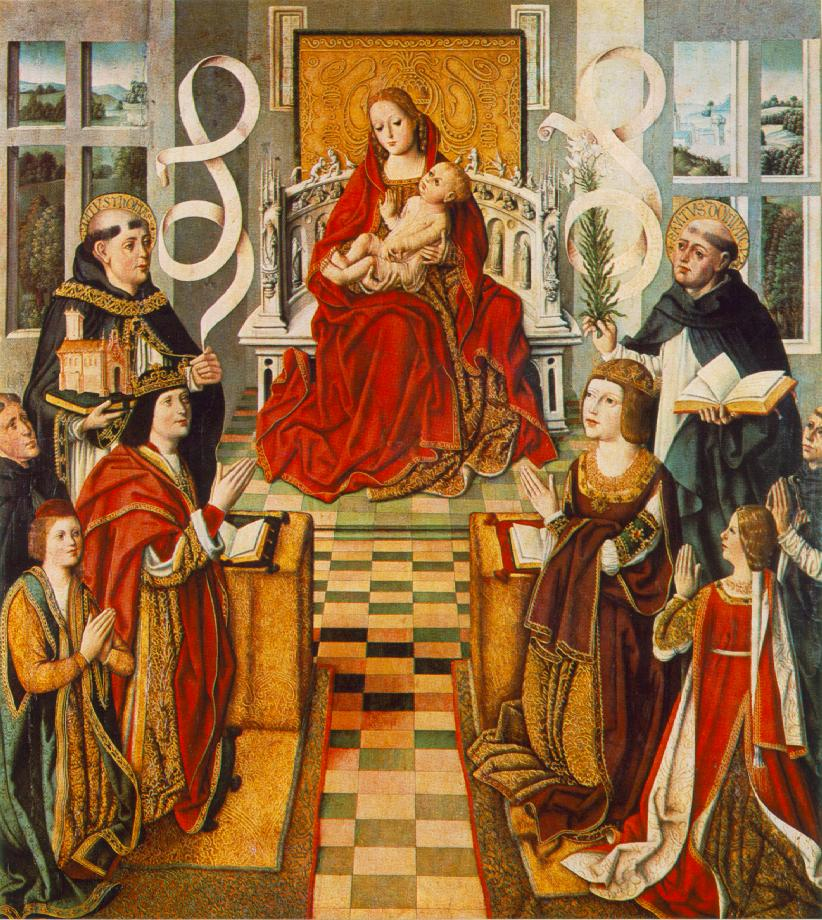
La Virgen de los Reyes Católicos , Fernando Gallego or follower of Fernando Gallego 1490, Museo del Prado

== Issues in attribution ==
Getty Museum’s Pietà

In 1988, Barbara Anderson wrote an article arguing the Pietà acquired by the J. Paul Getty Museum in 1985 was from the circle of Fernando Gallego. While this Pietà is a rather typical example of its kind, she notes the artist’s, “...blunt rejection of the female beauty and decorous grief typical of fifteenth-century depictions of the Virgin. In their place is a boldly unidealized but nonhistrionic depiction of profound sorrow." Anderson notes that as opposed to Flemish practice at the time, Spanish artists stripped away many of the mundane objects in order to emphasize a more conceptual religious experience. Provenance of the piece proved tricky, as the Virgin's face was overpainted in subsequent restorations, and its continental style led many scholars to believe it was an early 16th-century French piece.

When it was finally attributed to a Spanish artist by art historian Charles Sterling, it was at a time when workshops and masters were still being classified, and the Getty's piece was discussed as a possible Juan Nuñez or Bartolome Bermejo, due to the Netherlandish style and similarities in composition. Anderson compares the Pietà to the Crucifixion now in the Prado Museum and Saint Acacius and the Ten Thousand Martyrs on Mount Ararat in the SMU collection, discussing color palette, figural representation, and landscape. Although there are disparities between the three paintings, Anderson argues that they are all linked to Gallego's circle via style and date. This discussion proves the difficulties in attribution to Medieval and Early Renaissance works, many of which were completed in an artist's workshop and had many painters involved. As this was published in the late 1980s, more research has been conducted on Gallego's workshop and the Saint Acacius panel has now been attributed to Francisco Gallego, along with the Getty's Pietà.
