= Hispano-Flemish style =

Term coined by Spanish art historian Elias Tormo

Hispano-Flemish style is used to describe Spanish 15th century paintings and artworks that were influenced by the painters of the Northern Renaissance. The style flourished in the Kingdom of Castile, under the patronage of Queen Isabella I.

The main Flemish contribution to Spanish painting is a more a naturalistic style and the adoption of oil painting, which allowed a richer chromatic range, a luminosity and an attention to detail that was not possible with egg tempera. The Spanish devotional themes were depicted with an enhanced dramatism, increased detail, deeper landscapes and a distinctive stiff, angular treatment of drapery that recalls wood carving.

Artists in the Hispano-Flemish style include the painters Fernando Gallego, Bartolomé Bermejo, Pedro Berruguete and Juan de Flandes, the sculptor Gil de Siloe, and the architect Hannequin de Bruselas.

The collection of the Museo del Prado allows a comprehensive view of the evolution of this style in Spanish painting.

== Artworks ==
Such works could be produced both by Flemish artists employed on projects in the Iberian peninsula, and by Iberian artists whose training or inspiration shows Northern influence. Particularly major works in this style were created in the late 15th and early 16th centuries, especially during the reign of Isabel I of Castile. These notably include tombs, funerary chapels, sculpture, choir stalls, stained glass, and panel paintings influenced by Early Netherlandish painting.

== Paintings ==
Fernando Gallego's Pietà

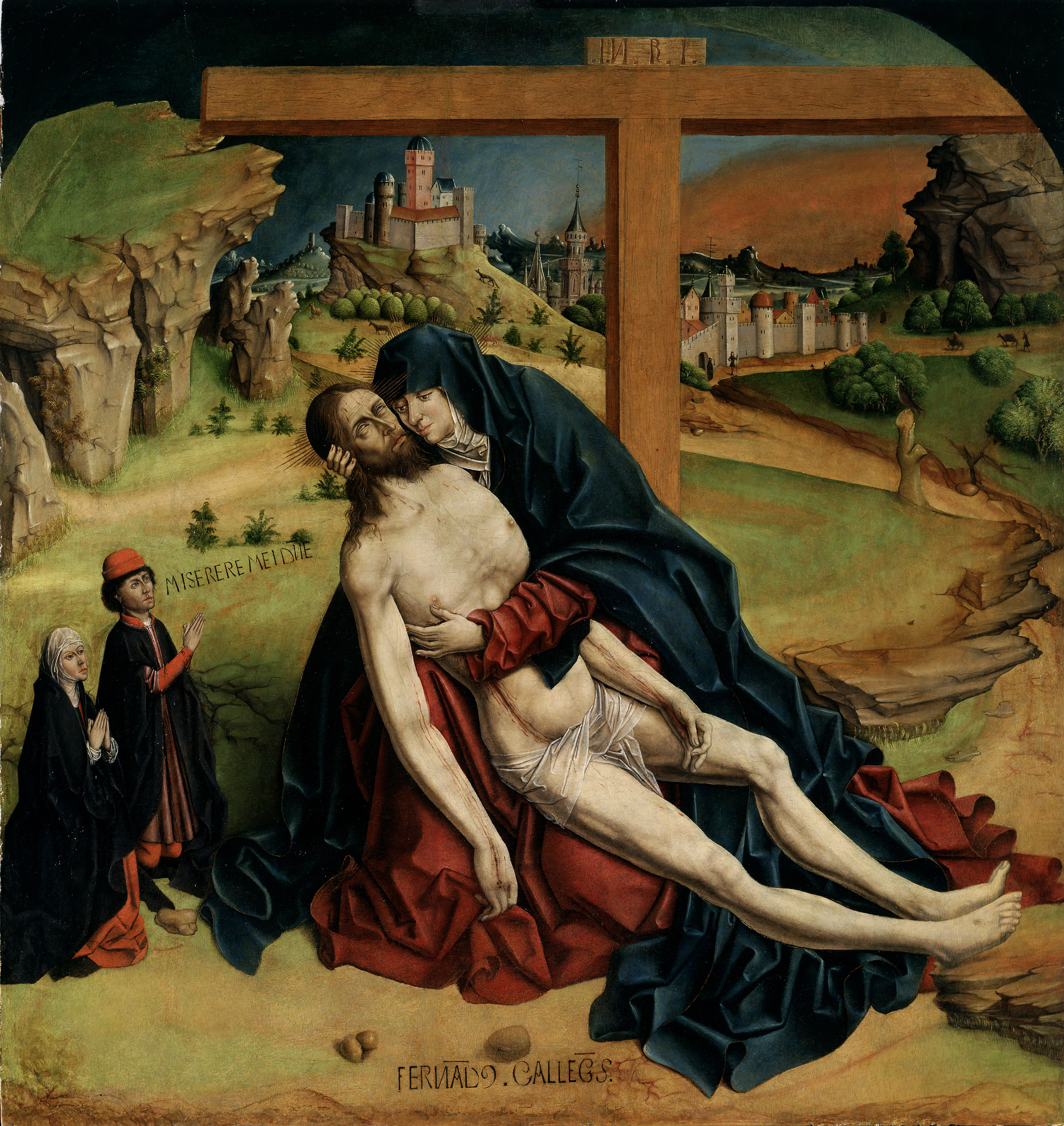
Fernando Gallego, Pietà (1465–70), El Prado Museum.

Fernando Gallego stands as the quintessential representative of the Hispano-Flemish style, with a distinctive "Castilian" interpretation of the Northern models; the figures are more severe and the emotional tenor more dramatic, bordering on expressionism.

In his Pietà panel, all the elements of this style are present: the pathos of the Virgin and Jesus figures, the arid and detailed Castilian landscape and the deep, angular folds in the blue mantle of the Virgin, a direct quotation from the prints of Martin Schongauer, which circulated widely in Castile, serving as models for composition and drapery studies.
