= Hannequin de Bruxelles =

15th-century architect

Hanequin de Bruxelles (Flanders, unknown date – Toledo, 1494) was a 15th-century Flemish architect and sculptor. He is considered to have introduced the Flemish Gothic style and the Hispano-Flemish style in Toledo.

== Biography ==
He arrived in Spain in 1440 and settled in Toledo to work as a general contractor in Toledo Cathedral between 1448 and 1470. Among other things, he was in charge of building the Portal of the Lions. He finished the cathedral tower and it is possible that he built the Chapel of Álvaro de Luna and also of his brother, both of which can be found inside the cathedral. Therefore, it is quite likely that he was also involved in the construction of Escalona Castle.

He worked alongside his brother Egas Cueman on the chapter house of Cuenca Cathedral in 1454. Furthermore, he probably restored the choir of the same cathedral based on his previous works in Toledo. Hannequin also worked on the chapel of Master Pedro Girón. It is quite likely that he created the foundations of the Castle of Belmonte (Cuenca), for Juan Pacheco in 1456. This is a unique castle of its type due to its exterior aspect which has nine curtain walls and six slight towers that seem to form pincers.

In 1465 he appeared with his son, Hanequin de Cuellar, in Cuellar to carry out the renovations and extensions of the castle of Beltrán de la Cueva, Duke of Albuquerque, who had taken possession of the village for the first time a year before. Albuquerque wanted to reinforce the construction because of Isabella I of Castile's views on the ownership of Cuellar. He had a barbican built all around the castle, extending the bailey.
