= Mayor Vicente Villafañe =

Coordinates: 26°12′16″S 59°04′49″W

- Interactive map of Mayor Vicente Villafañe
- Country: Argentina
- Province: Formosa Province
- Time zone: UTC−3 (ART)
- Climate: Cfa

Mayor Vicente Villafañe is a settlement in northern Argentina. It is located in Formosa Province.
