= Torregalindo =

Coordinates: 41°35′N 3°45′W

- Municipality and town
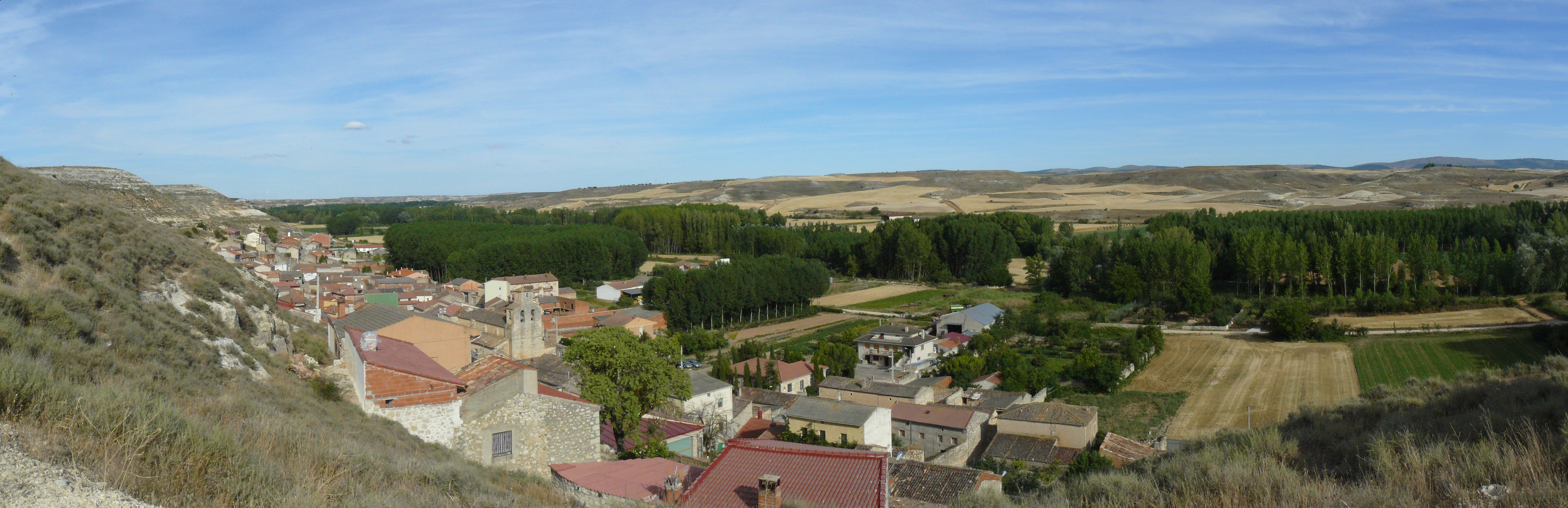
- View of Torregalindo from its castle, 2011

- Flag Coat of arms
- Interactive map of Torregalindo
- Country: Spain
- Autonomous community: Castile and León
- Province: Burgos
- Comarca: Ribera del Duero

Area
  - Total: 15 km^{2} (5.8 sq mi)

Population (2025-01-01)
  - Total: 130
  - Density: 8.7/km^{2} (22/sq mi)
- Time zone: UTC+1 (CET)
  - Summer (DST): UTC+2 (CEST)
- Postal code: 09493
- Website: http://www.torregalindo.es/

Torregalindo is a municipality and town located in the province of Burgos, Castile and León, Spain. According to the 2004 census (INE), the municipality has a population of 126 inhabitants.
