= Juan de Arphe y Villafañe =

Spanish artist

Juan de Arphe y Villafañe, also spelled Juan de Arfe y Villafañe (1535–1603) was a Spanish engraver, goldsmith, artist, anatomist and writer. He was of German descent.

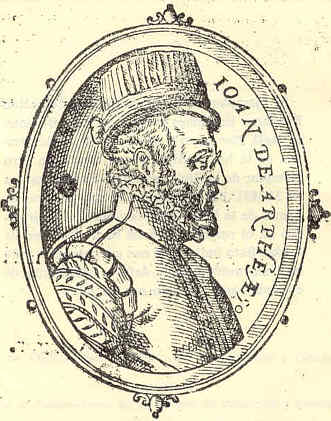

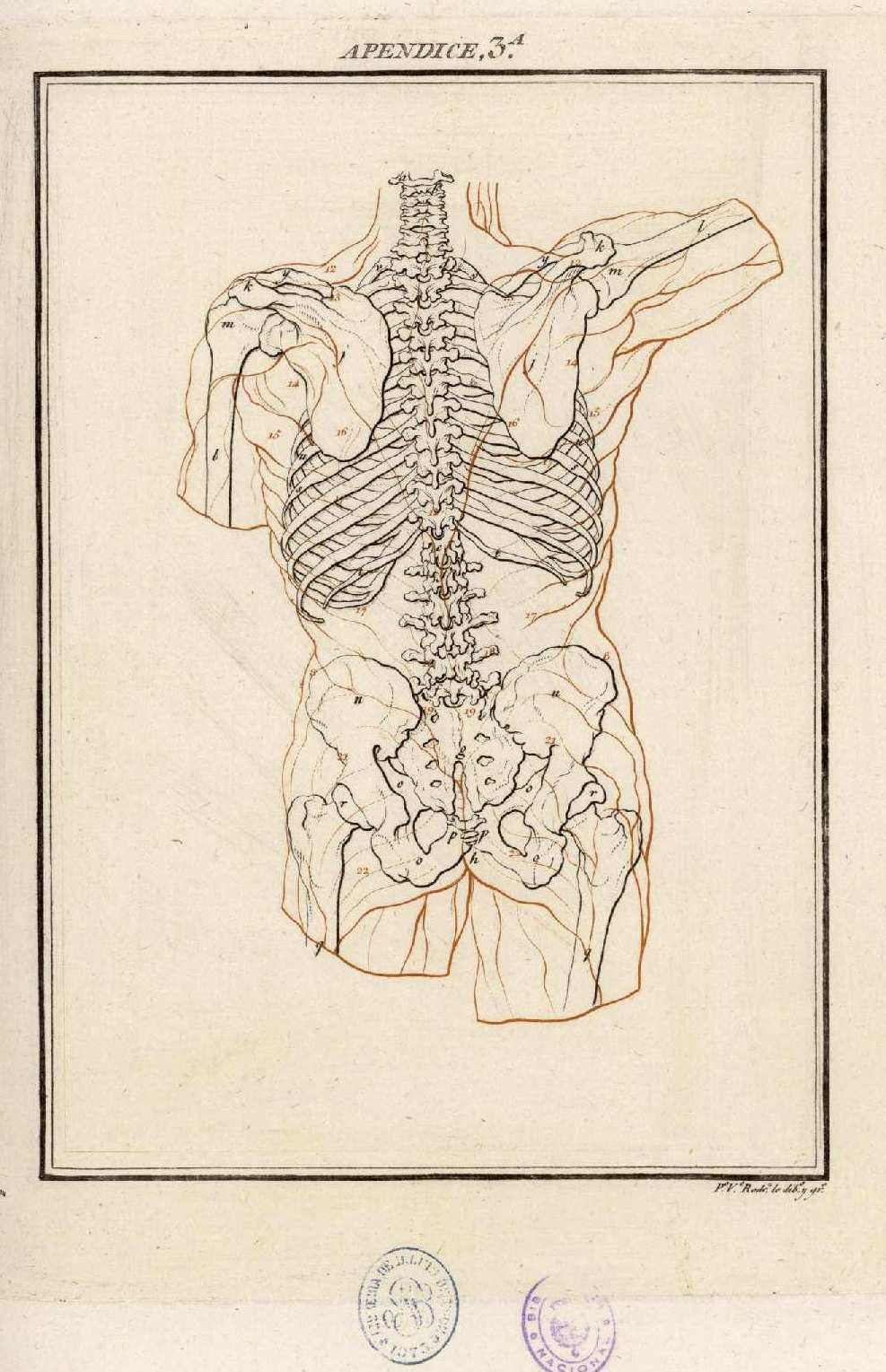
1806 reprinting of his anatomical plates.

Born in Leon, Arphe y Villafañe was instructed by his father, Antonio, in goldsmithing and engraving, and also studied anatomy in Toledo and Salamanca. Following his father's death, Villafañe moved to Valladolid, where he worked as a goldsmith, mostly for churches and cathedrals, making monstrances and other pieces for cities including Ávila, Seville and Burgos. At the same time, he was an architect and a sculptor, and worked as an engraver and creator of woodcuts, as well as being the assayer of a mint in Segovia.

Arphe-Villafañe wrote several books of which the best known was his Varia comesuracion para la escultura y arquitectura. Each of the four books which comprised the work focused on one of Arphe-Villafañe's subjects of expertise:

- The first book discussed geometry in brief, and gnomonics at great length.
- The second book focused on the anatomy of the human body.
- The third book contained many illustrations of animals, and the text described quadrupeds and birds.
- The fourth book talks solely on architecture and closely related subject matters.

All of the books contained many woodcuts, some full page, with others mixed with the text.

He was a close friend of Don José Velázquez de Medrano, a silversmith raised to the ranks of the finest "sculptors of silver and gold" who were shaped by Juan de Arphe y Villafañe.

He moved to Madrid some years before his death, and he spent the final years of his life there, before he died of undocumented causes early into the 17th century.

== Notes and references ==
Specific

General

- Richard Ford A Handbook for Travellers in Spain. 1855
- Donald Frederick Lach Asia in the Making of Europe. University of Chicago Press, 1977
