= Beltrán de la Cueva, 1st Duke of Alburquerque =

Castilian nobleman (c. 1443–1492)

Beltrán de la Cueva
- Duke of Alburquerque
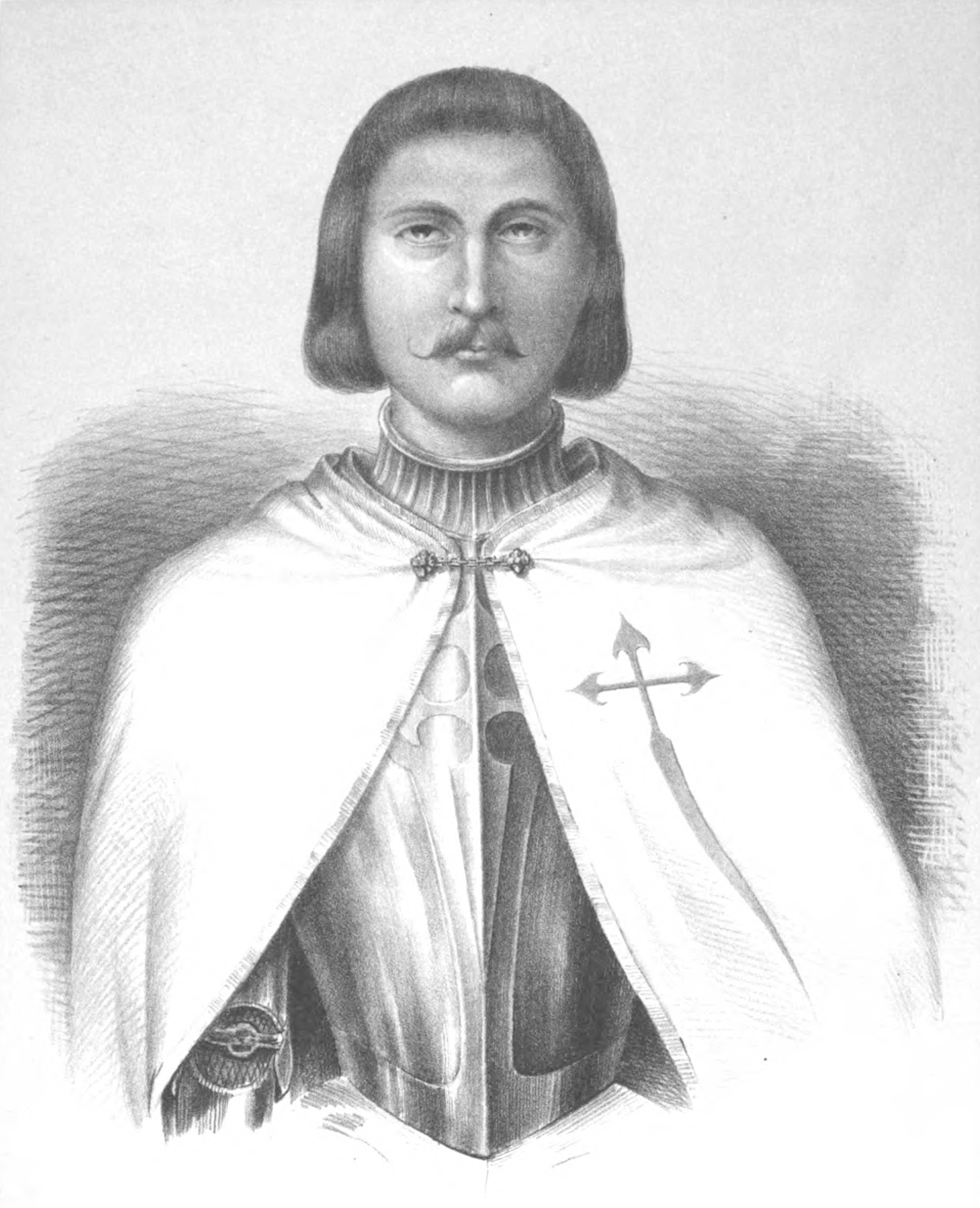
- Born: c.1443 Úbeda, Andalusia, Crown of Castille, Iberian Peninsula
- Died: November 1, 1492 (aged 48–49); Cuéllar, Spain

Beltrán de la Cueva y Alfonso de Mercado, 1st Duke of Alburquerque (c. 1443 – 1 November 1492) was a Castilian nobleman who is said to have fathered Joanna, the daughter of Henry IV of Castile's wife Joan of Portugal. His alleged daughter, called "la Beltraneja", was deprived of the crown of Castile because of the uncertainty regarding her parentage.

== Early life ==
Henry IV, in his second year as king, travelled to Úbeda and stayed with Beltrán's father, Diego Fernández de la Cueva, 1st Viscount of Huelma. When he left this house, he took Diego's second oldest son, Beltrán, with him to stay at Court to show his gratitude to Diego. (Diego offered Beltrán after Enrique asked for Diego's oldest son, whom Diego wanted to keep close by).

He married as his first wife Teresa de Molina de Quesada, of Úbeda, daughter of Francisco Cazorla de Quesada and wife Guiomar Mayor de Molina y Vera, without issue.

Beltrán soon became the King's favourite and married Cardinal Mendoza's niece, Doña Mencía Hurtado de Mendoza y Luna, daughter of Diego Hurtado de Mendoza, 1st Duke of the Infantado.

== Royal affairs ==
Beltrán de la Cueva is, however, best known for allegedly having an affair with Henry's second wife, Joan of Portugal. It was rumoured that Henry's only child, Joanna was fathered by Beltrán and not by the King himself, who may have been impotent. This rumour led to a four-year War of the Castilian Succession, which was won by Isabella I, Henry's half-sister. It is unlikely that an agreement as to Joanna's probable paternity will ever be reached by historians, as there is not enough evidence to support either possible father with certainty. Most of the extant contemporary sources about Henry's potency are suspect, as the royal chronicles of his reign were either written or revised under the influence of Isabella, whose personal interest in the succession caused her to take great pains to insist on Joanna's illegitimacy. Much of Isabella's attention to Henry, in fact, was spent on harming his reputation in order to cement the legitimacy of her own reign. The question of Joanna's paternity has, as a result, fascinated historians for centuries: if Joanna was not in fact Beltran's daughter, and was actually legitimate, Isabella's tremendously influential reign would have been an illegal usurpation.

Royal chronicler Alfonso de Palencia, known for his particularly venomous attitude toward Henry, made many allusions in his writings that can be interpreted as accusations concerning Beltran's sexuality. Palencia and other avid anti-Henryites often accused the two of pursuing a homosexual relationship, though it is not clear to what extent these accusations were based on fact, or whether they were a form of anti-Henry, pro-rebellion, pro-Isabelline propaganda.

== Height of power ==
Beltran was Henry IV's most-cherished favourite. Throughout his time in court, Henry showered him with gifts—land, money, offices—of such magnitude that many nobles of higher background took offense. He was a Grand Master of the Order of Santiago and Chamberlain-Major. In 1462, the King granted him the title of Count of Ledesma. In 1463, Henry was forced to dismiss Beltrán from the court. As compensation, Henry made him Duke of Alburquerque and Grandee of Spain, by a letter issued at Segovia on 16 November or 26 November 1464. Henry also created him Lord of Cuéllar, Roa, Atienza, Torregalindo, Codecera, etc.

In 1467, he fought in the Second Battle of Olmedo against the faction who had claimed to depose Henry in favor of his brother Prince Alfonso. As a reward, he was also created Count of Huelma by Henry on 20 August 1474. Henry died in December, and this latest title was confirmed by the new Queen Isabella I of Castile and her husband Ferdinand II of Aragon on 20 April 1475. In the War of the Castilian Succession, Beltran supported Isabella against his presumed daughter Joan.

He also distinguished himself in 1491 in the conquest of Granada along with his son Don Francisco.

Beltrán de la Cueva died in 1492. In his second will, Beltrán de la Cueva ordered alabaster tombs to be built for himself, some of his wives, and his brother, Gutierre de la Cueva. He instructed that they be placed in the Monastery of San Francisco in Chéllar, designating it as the family pantheon of his house.

== Marriage and Children ==
He married in Guadalajara in 1462 Mencía de Mendoza y Luna, daughter of Diego Hurtado de Mendoza, 1st Duke of the Infantado, and his first wife Brianda de Mendoza y Luna. The children of this marriage were:

- Francisco Fernández de la Cueva (1467–1526), succeeded his father.
- Antonio de la Cueva y Mendoza, married Elvira de Ayala.
- Íñigo de la Cueva y Mendoza, first an ecclesiastic and then a military man, who married his niece Ana de la Cueva y Mendoza.
- Mayor de la Cueva y Mendoza, married to Pedro de Navarra y Lacarra, Grand Marshal of the Kingdom of Navarre.
- Brianda de la Cueva y Luna, married Fernando Gómez Dávila, lord of Navamorcuende, Villatoro and Cardiel.
- Mencía de la Cueva.

After Mencía de Mendoza died in 1476, he married in the same year to Mencía Enríquez de Toledo, daughter of García Álvarez de Toledo, 1st Duke of Alba, and María Enríquez. They had one son:

- García de la Cueva y Toledo, died a few months after birth.

He remarried in 1482 to María de Velasco y Mendoza, widow of Juan Pacheco, and daughter of Pedro Fernández de Velasco, 2nd Count of Haro. The children of this marriage were:

- Cristóbal de la Cueva y Velasco, lord of Roa, who married Leonor de Velasco y Carrillo, 3rd Countess of Siruela. Had issue.
- Pedro de la Cueva y Velasco, lord of Torregalindo.

In addition, he had at least two other natural children:

- Juan de la Cueva y Santiago, with Beatriz de Santiago, his vassal and resident of Cuéllar.
- Bernaldino de la Cueva, with Isabel la Serrana, also a resident of Cuéllar.

He is also believed to be the natural father of Juana la Beltraneja, daughter of Juana de Portugal.
According to Portuguese sources, he was also the father of Manuel Beltrán (Manuel Beltrão in Portuguese): married to Francisca da Mota, with descendants in Portugal.

== See also ==
- Henry IV of Castile
- Joan of Portugal
- Joanna La Beltraneja
- Isabella I of Castile
- Alfonso of Castile, Prince of Asturias
- War of the Castilian Succession

== Sources ==
- Carceller Cerviño, María del Pilar (2006). Realidad y representación de la nobleza castellana del siglo XV: el linaje de la Cueva y la casa ducal de Alburquerque (PDF). Universidad Complutrense de Madrid. ISBN 978-84-669-2982-0.
- "Castillo de Cuéllar" (in Spanish). 2007. Archived from the original on 25 February 2009.
- Castro Pereira Mouzinho de Albuquerque e Cunha, Fernando de (1995). Instrumentário Genealógico - Linhagens Milenárias (in Portuguese). pp. 329–30.
- Costa Felgueiras Gaio, Manuel José da. Nobiliário das Famílias de Portugal (in Portuguese). Vol. VII. Portugal: Beltroens.
- John Browne Ayes, Biogeographical Genealogist: http://www.blogster.com/ayesart/de-la-cueva-genealogy-corrected-and-continued
- Hobbs, Nicolas (2007). "Grandes de España" (in Spanish).
- Sousa, Dom António Caetano de (1946). História Genealógica da Casa Real Portuguesa (in Portuguese). Vol. VI (2ª Edição ed.). Coimbra, Portugal: Atlântida-Livraria Editora, Lda. p. 323.
- Instituto de Salazar y Castro. Elenco de Grandezas y Titulos Nobiliarios Españoles (in Spanish). periodic publication.
- "Origin of the Surname Cortés" (in Spanish). 2007. Archived from the original on December 11, 2008.
- "Beltrán de La Cueva" (in Spanish). 2007.
- "Geneallnet" (in Spanish). 2007.
- Velasco Bayón, Balbino (1996). Historia de Cuéllar [History of Cuéllar] (in Spanish) (Fourth ed.). Segovia. ISBN 84-500-4620-3.

Spanish nobility
New title	Duke of Alburquerque; 1464–1492	Succeeded by Francisco; Fernández de la Cueva
New title	Count of Ledesma; 1462–1492	Succeeded by Francisco; Fernández de la Cueva
Preceded by Juan de la Cueva	Count of Huelma; 1474–1492	Succeeded by Francisco; Fernández de la Cueva

Preceded by Enrique IV de Castilla	Grand Master of the Order of Santiago; 1462–1463	Succeeded by Alfonso de Castilla
