= Plaza de España (Santo Domingo) =

Public square in Santo Domingo, Dominican Republic

Coordinates: 18.4769°N 69.8832°W

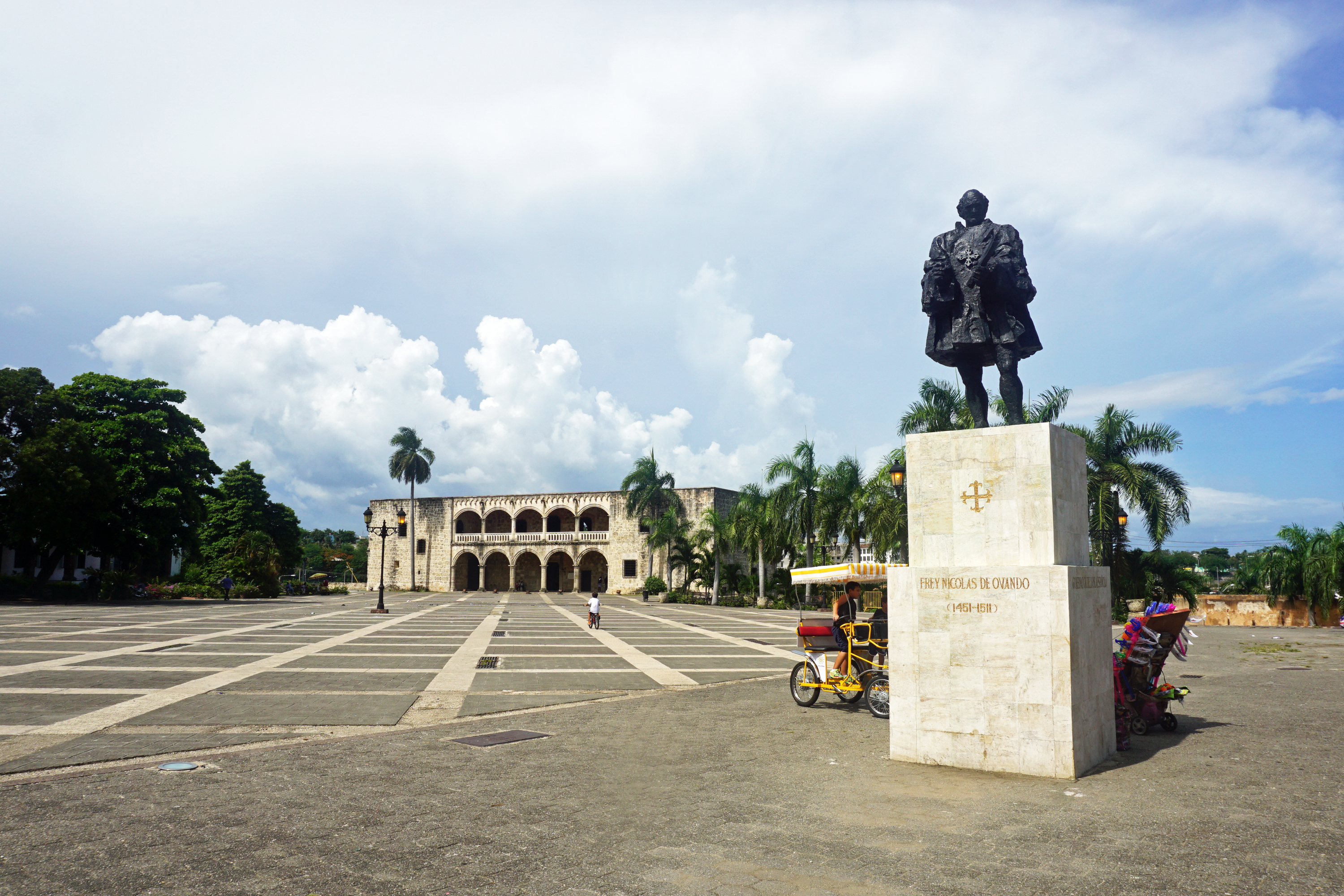
- Plaza de España with the statue of Nicolás de Ovando, governor of La Española, and the Alcázar de Colón in the background.
- Interactive map of Plaza de España
- Type: Plaza
- Location: Ciudad Colonial; Santo Domingo; Dominican Republic
- Opening: Early 16th century 1990 (remodeling)
- Operator: Santo Domingo City Council

The Plaza de España, also known as the Plaza de la Hispanidad, is a public square located in the historic district of Ciudad Colonial, Santo Domingo, Dominican Republic. To its north lies the historic Alcázar de Colón, dating back to 1514, and to the south, the Museo de las Casas Reales, built in 1511.

The plaza is a popular gathering spot in the city, surrounded by a variety of restaurants and outdoor terraces. Due to its large size, it is also a popular venue for concerts and festivals.

== Description ==
On the northeast side of the plaza stands the Alcázar de Colón, dating from 1514, which is the most visited museum in the country. At the center of the plaza is a statue of Nicolás de Ovando, the governor of La Española who ordered the reconstruction of the city. On the south side is the Museo de las Casas Reales, built in 1511 by order of King Ferdinand II of Aragon to house the administrative offices of the Provincial deputation in Spanish America. To the east of the plaza is the Ozama River.

== History ==
Built in the early 16th century, Plaza de España was an important social center for the first Spanish families in the city. It was the commercial and social hub of the city.

During the 19th century, several houses were built around the plaza.

In 1990, the plaza was remodeled when the Ciudad Colonial of Santo Domingo was declared a World Heritage Site by UNESCO. As part of the remodeling, a fountain in the center of the plaza was removed.

== Gallery ==
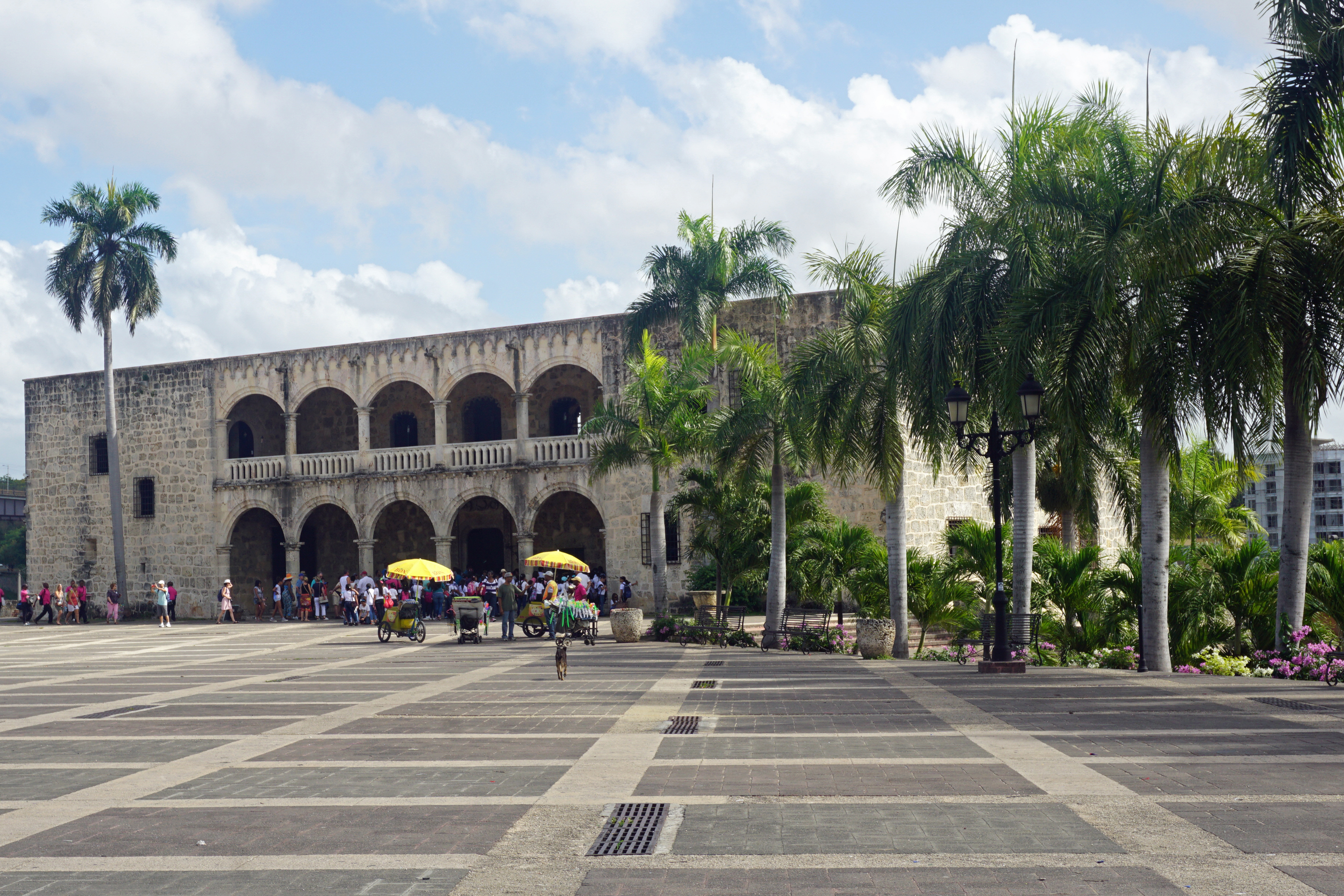
Vista de la plaza y el Alcázar de Colón in 2017

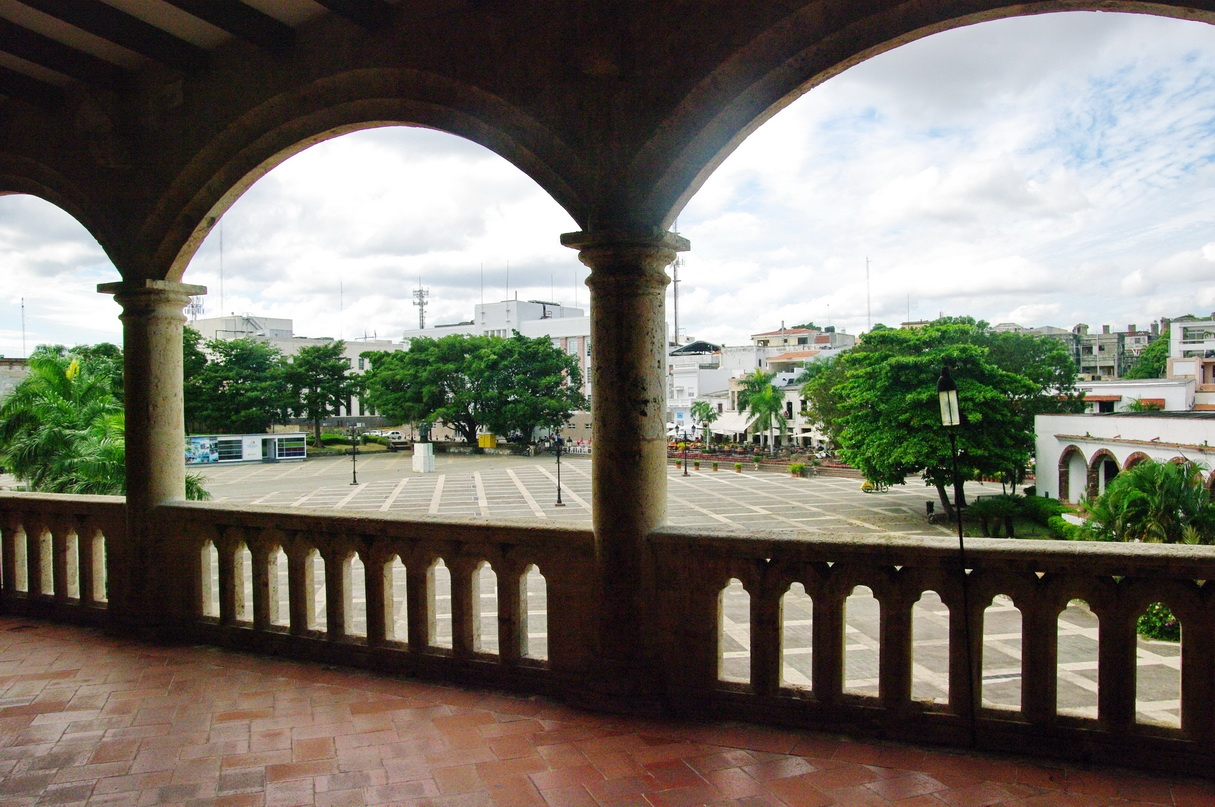
Vista de la plaza desde el Alcázar de Colón

== See also ==
- Dominican Republic–Spain relations
- Ciudad Colonial
