= Parque Colón =

Historic plaza in Dominican Republic

Coordinates: 18.4735°N 69.8840°W

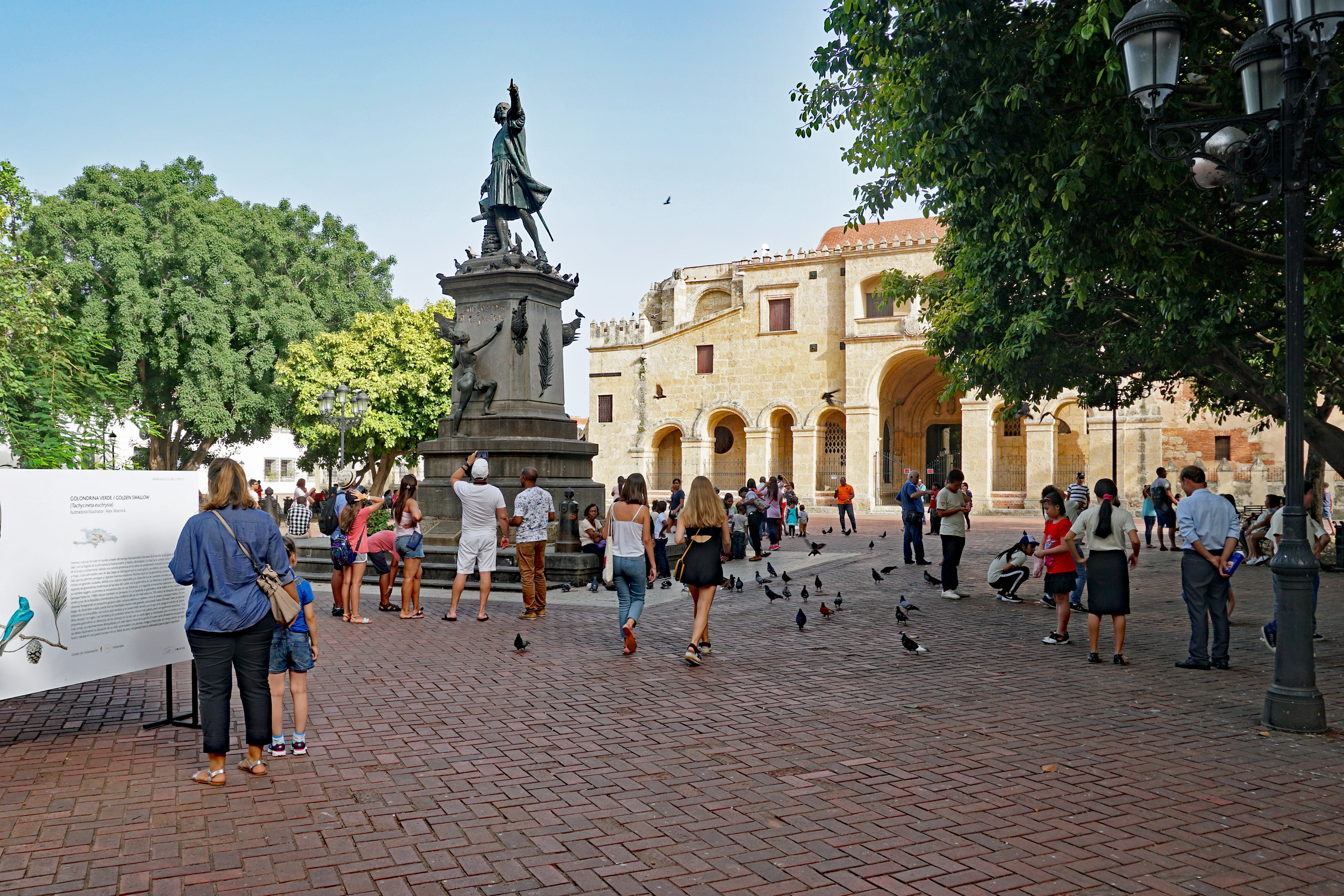
People in Columbus park, Santo Domingo, Dominican Republic.

Parque Colón (Spanish pronunciation: [ˈpaɾke koˈlon]; lit. 'Columbus Park') is the central square of the Ciudad Colonial historic district of Santo Domingo, Dominican Republic. In its center stands a statue of Christopher Columbus, in whose honor the square was renamed in 1887. Previously the square was known as Plaza Mayor.

Monuments bordering the square include the Catedral de Santa Maria la Menor, Santo Domingo's Palace, and the Palacio Borgella, which once hosted the Dominican Republic's Parliament. Calle del Conde, once the thriving commercial heart of Santo Domingo, starts from Parque Colón and runs to the Puerta del Conde. At the beginning of Calle del Conde is a bust of Bartholomew Columbus, Christopher's brother and the founder of Santo Domingo.

== History ==
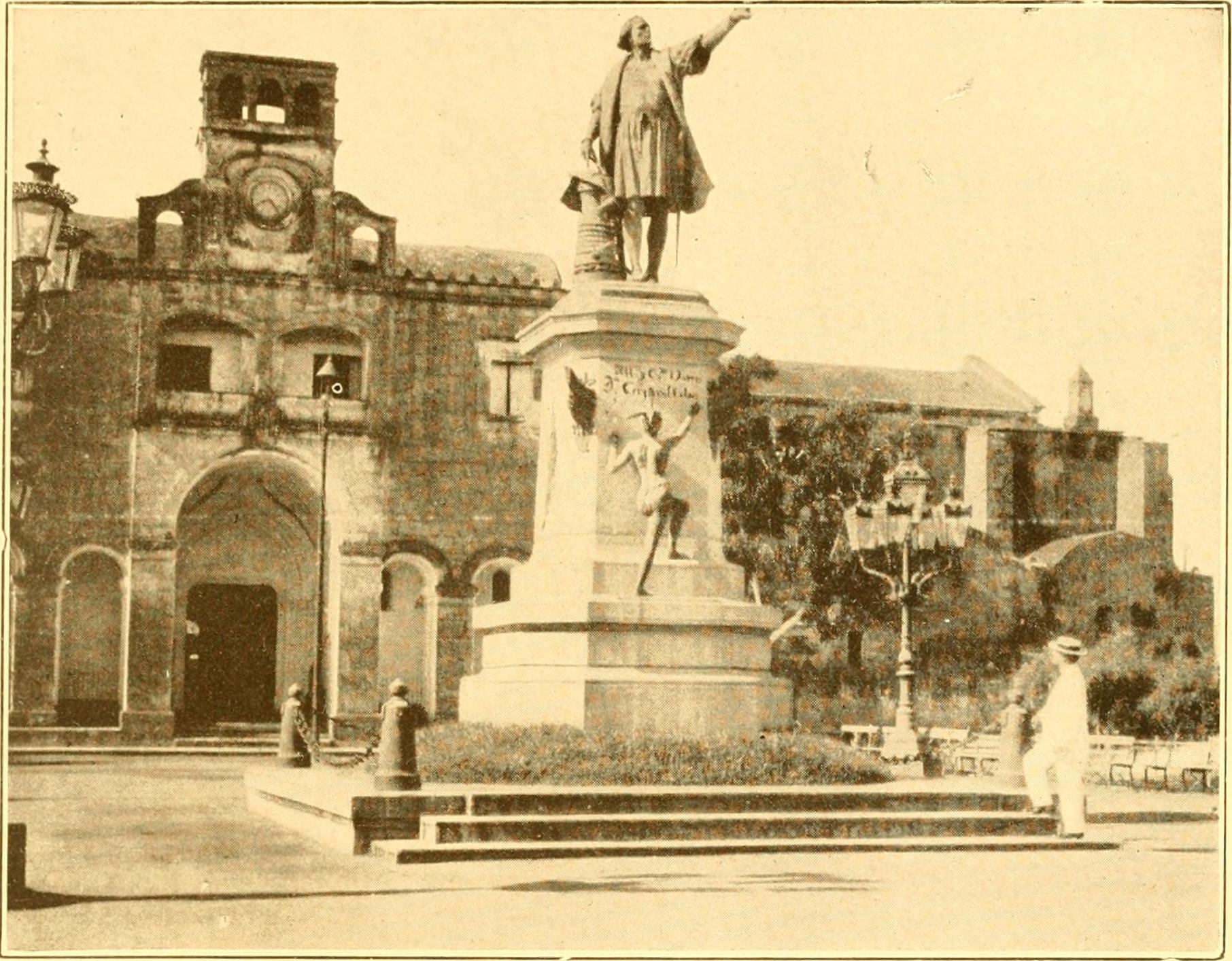
Photograph of Columbus park, Dominican Republic in early 1900s.

During the colonial period of the 15th century, various buildings were built on the island of Hispaniola, which were the first colonial houses in the entire American Continent. Within these residential constructions the Parque Colón was created, which was called by the name of Plaza Mayor de Santo Domingo, which dates back to 1506, and throughout the years to this day it has undergone various modifications.

This was the main entertainment center for the inhabitants of the time, since it gave life and splendor to the town of La Isabela, and its surroundings. The name of Plaza Mayor was given in honor of the Major Commander of the order of Nicolás de Ovando, who arrived in Santo Domingo in 1502. It was named after him even more, since he was in charge of moving the city to the western part of the Ozama River.

Previously it was called as Plaza de la Catedral, since a few meters from the square was the Catedral Primada de América. In the center of this park is the statue of Grand Admiral Christopher Columbus pointing north, and it was a creation of the French sculptor E. Gilbert. On February 27, 1887, it was officially inaugurated as Parque Colón, since there was the statue of Columbus.

== Location ==
Colón Park is located on Calle El Conde, on the corner of Calle Arzobispo Meriño, in the Colonial Zone, in the city of Santo Domingo, in the Dominican Republic.

== Gallery ==
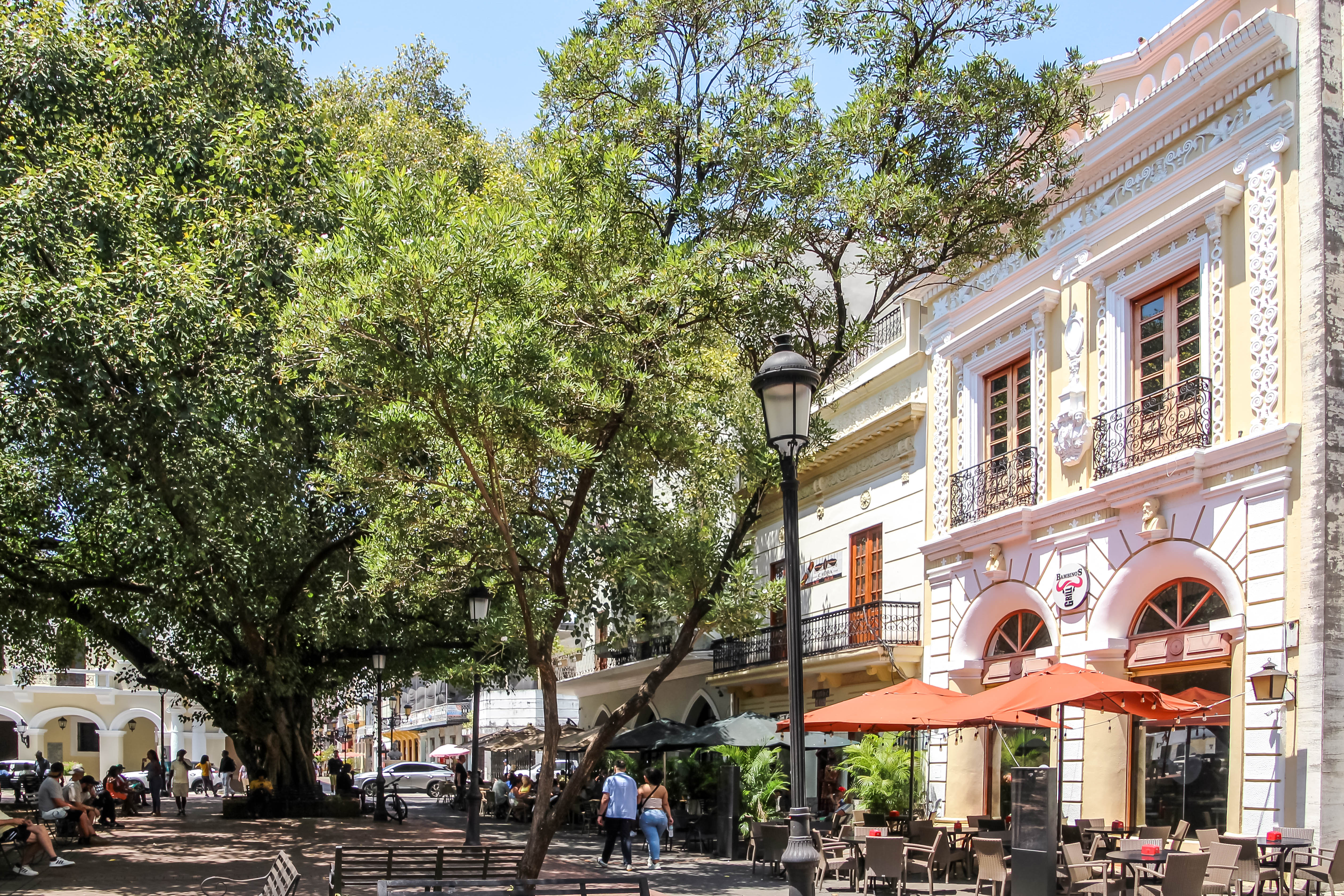

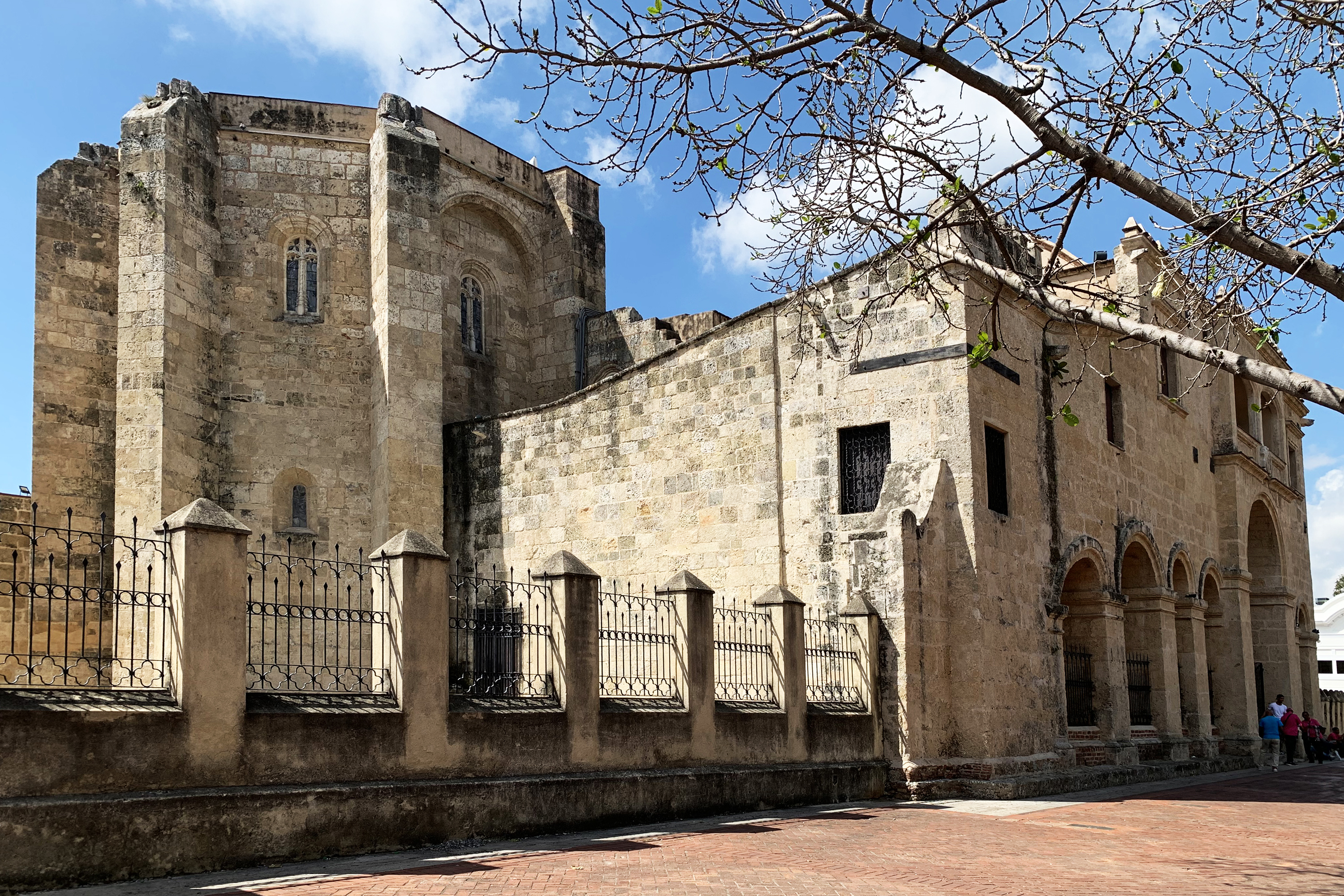

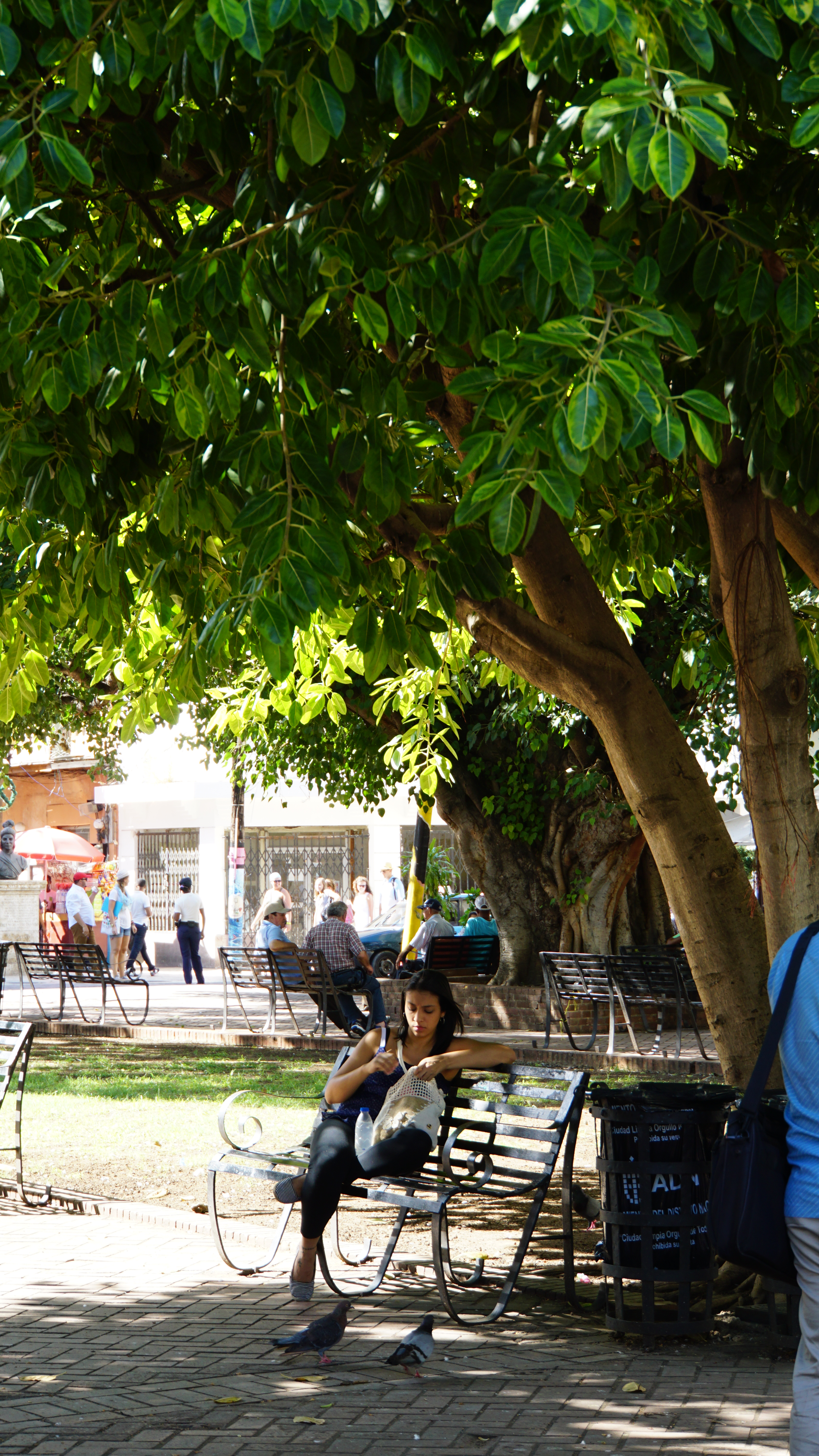

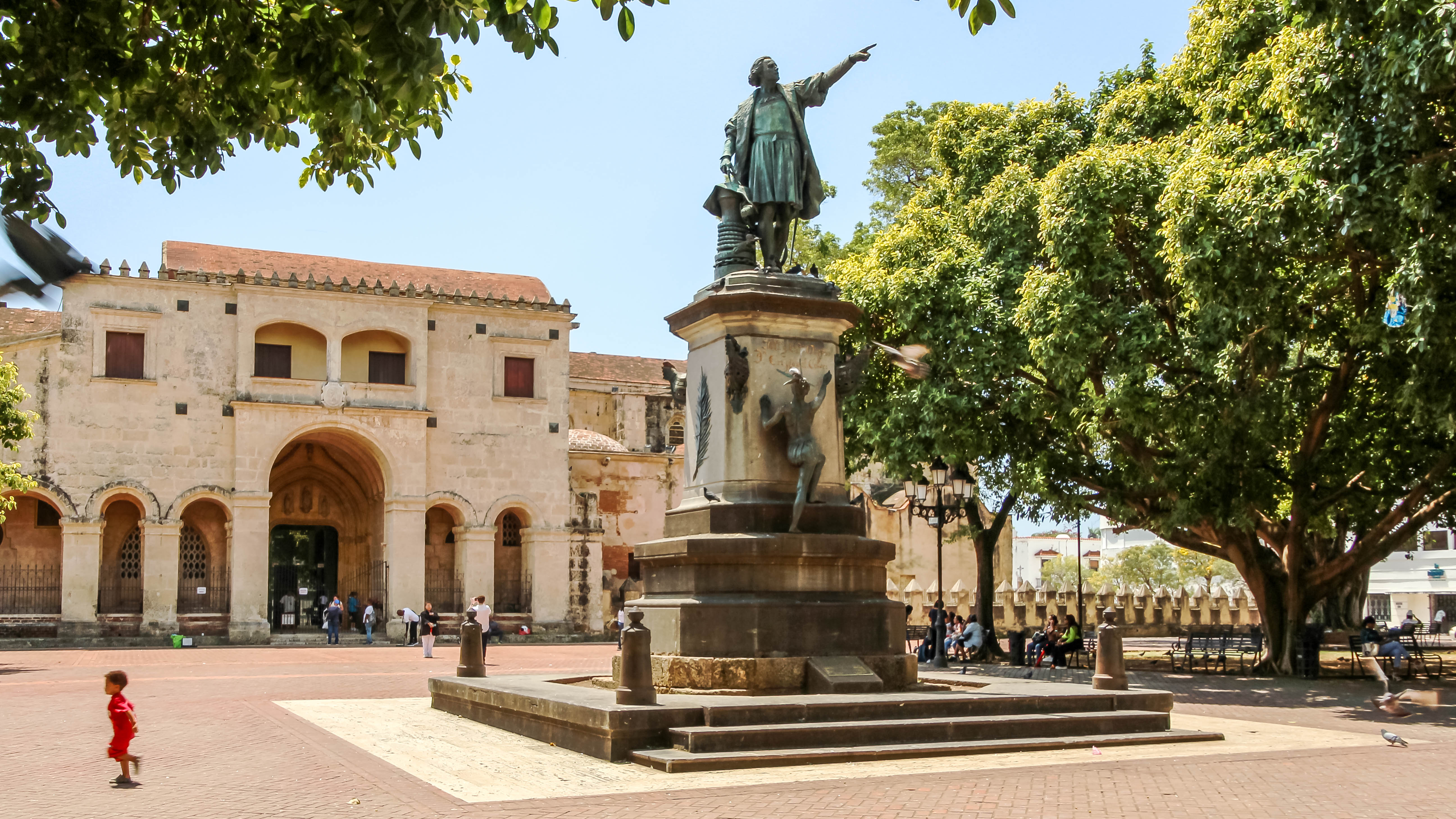
Cathedral and Statue of Columbus

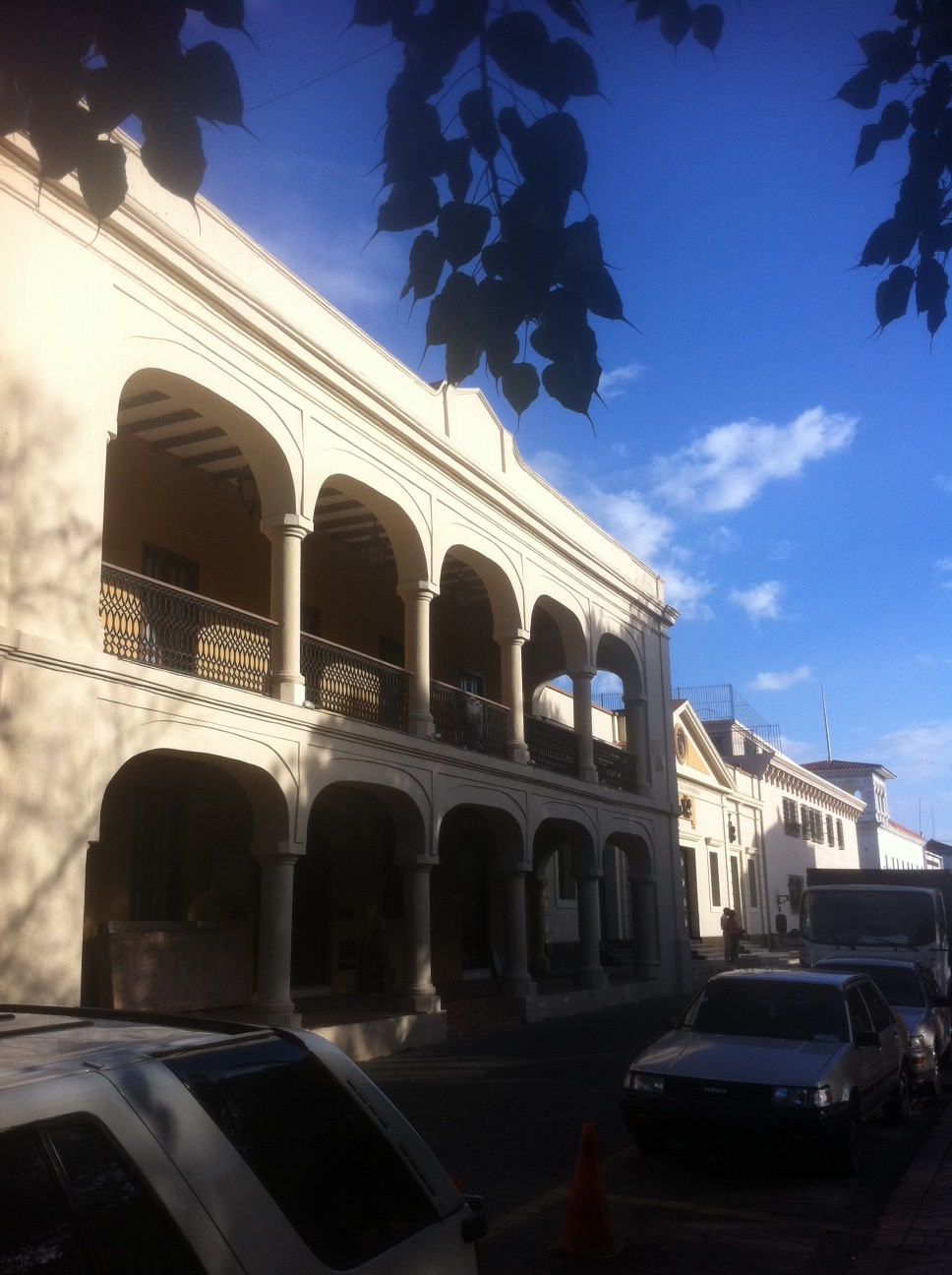
Portico of Palacio Borgella

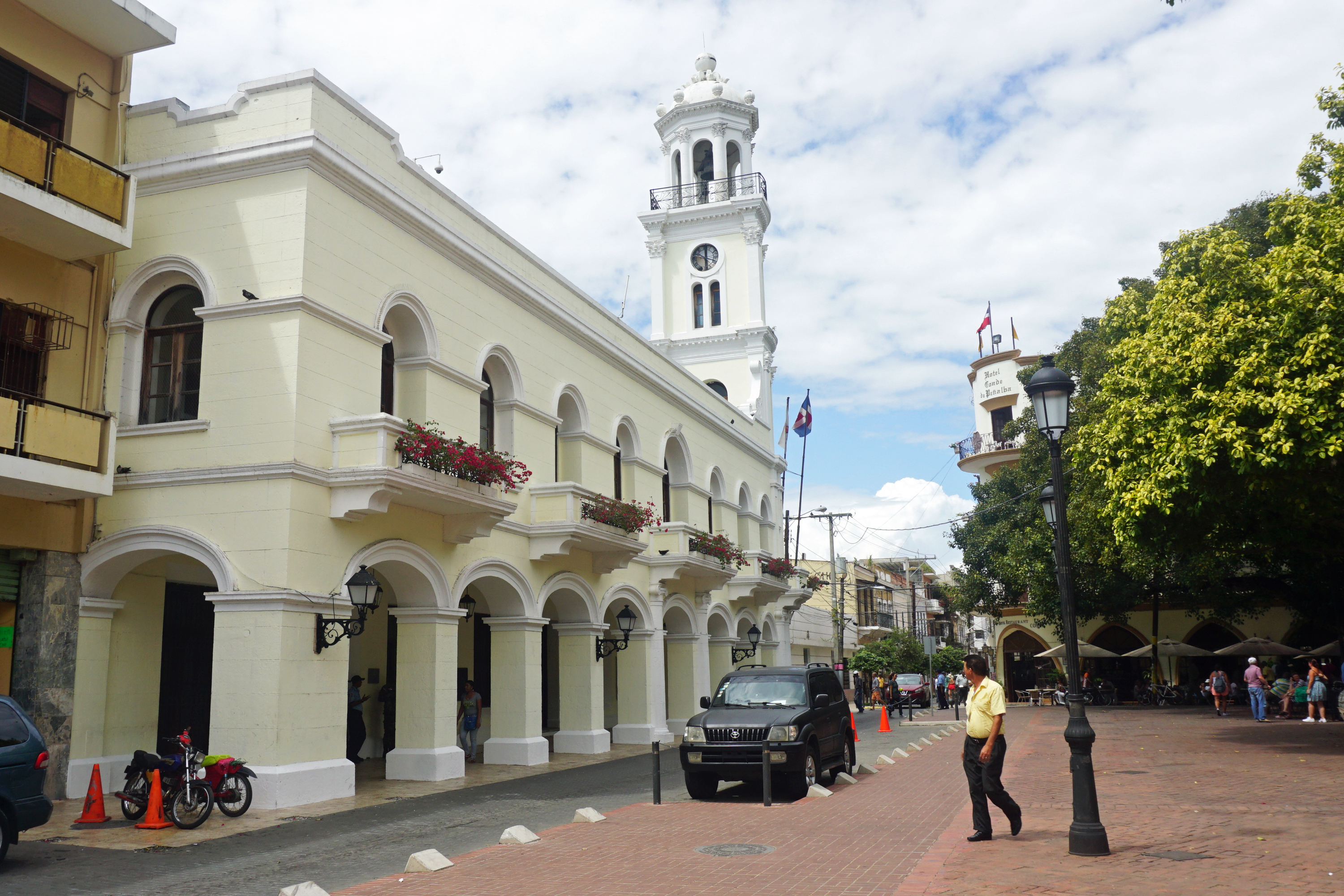
Palacio Consistorial

== See also ==
- Ciudad Colonial (Santo Domingo)
- List of monuments and memorials to Christopher Columbus
