= Memorial Museum of Dominican Resistance =

Dominican Museum in Santo Domingo, Dominican Republic

- Museo Memorial de la Resistencia Dominicana
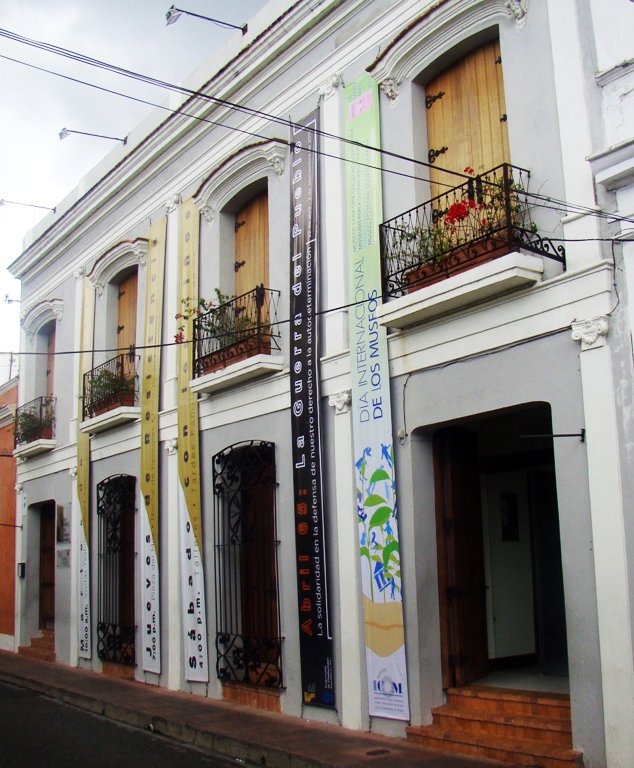
- Established: 2011
- Coordinates: 18.4716°N 69.8881°W
- Director: Luisa De Peña Díaz
- President: Noris González Mirabal

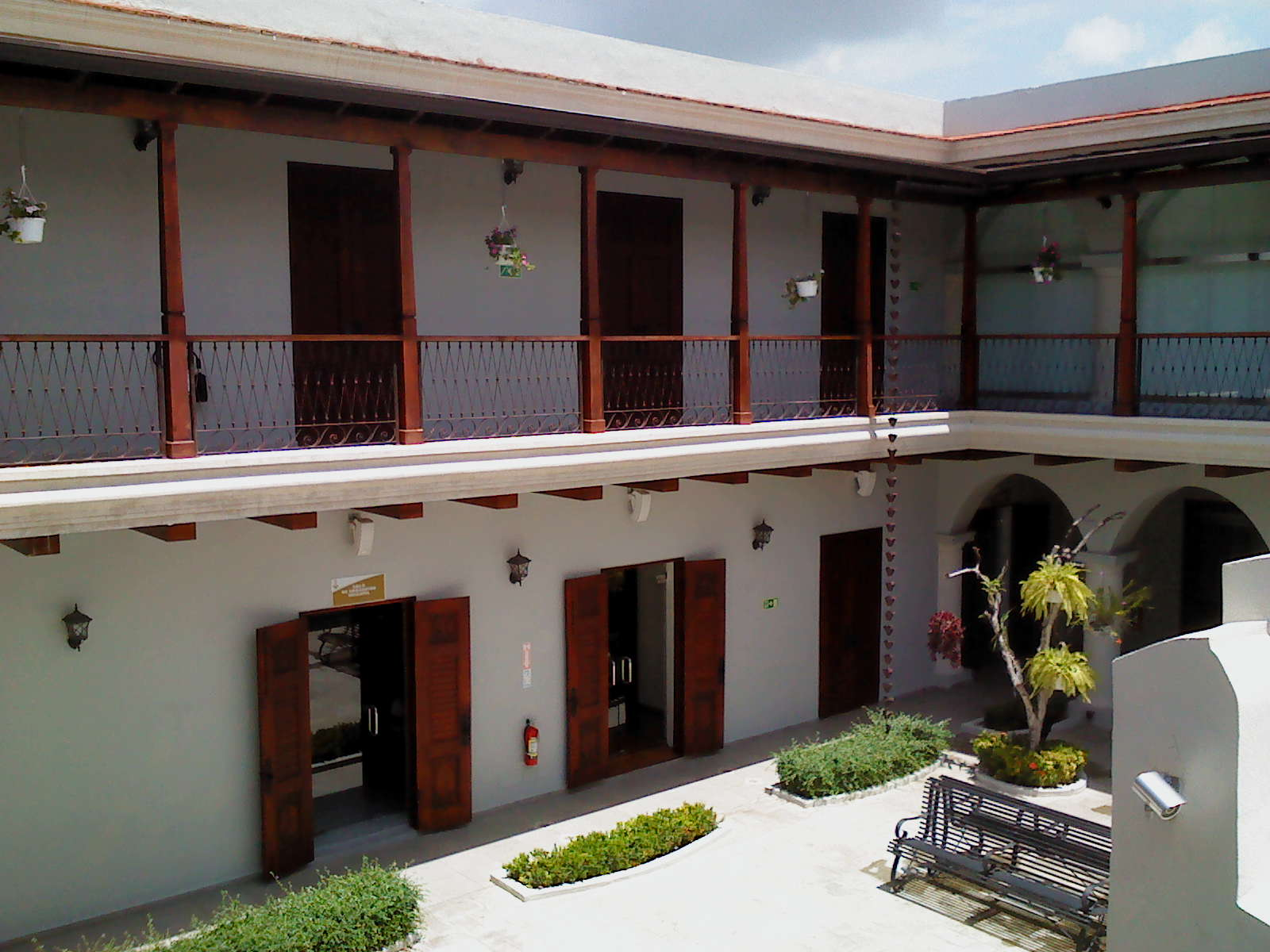
Interior view of museum

The Memorial Museum of Dominican Resistance (Spanish: Museo Memorial de la Resistencia Dominicana) is a museum dedicated to the preservation of the history regarding the struggles of several generations of Dominicans during the dictatorship of Rafael L. Trujillo, including its background and its consequences. On July 31, 2009, the museum's collection was declared part of the Memory of the World Programme by UNESCO, in order to protect its preservation and facilitate its access through this program.

== History ==
The Memorial Museum of the Dominican Resistance was inspired by a concerned mother and a friend in 1995. The mother of the freedom fighter Tony Mota Ricart, Mrs. Angela Ricart, was concerned about who would look after her son's things that reflected his brave patriotism and sacrifice for the country after she died. This concern was expressed to her friend Cristina Gautier, who brought it up to her granddaughter, who at the time was the director of the Columbus Lighthouse and the future founding director of the museum, Luisa De Peña. With his mother reminding him of their responsibility to fallen heroes, Luisa De Peña began to plan the museum.

While looking for support, many replied that the Museum of History and Geography and several commemorative monuments already existed. This did not discourage Luisa De Peña who, with the support of Mrs. Angela Ricart and his mother, continued knocking on doors and moving the project forward. Finally, he approached the Manolo Tavárez Justo Foundation where the project received a warm welcome. It was also immediately well received by the Mirabal Sisters Foundation through Noris González Mirabal, a member of both foundations. At the same time, the Testimony Foundation joined the project, and they also had the idea of creating a museum. In the summer of 2000, the President of the Dominican Republic, Dr. Leonel Fernández, provided the Casa de las Fundaciones ("House of the Foundations"), located on Isabel La Católica street, for the establishment of a museum.

In 2000, the Minister of Culture, Tony Raful, learned of the project, and he immediately supported it.

In 2001, the Manolo Tavárez Justo Foundation proceeded to invite various patriotic foundations to participate in the project. A presentation was made at the Casa de las Fundaciones in the presence of the Tony Raful and seven patriotic foundations. In that same year, the International Council of Museums created the International Committee for Memorial Museums in Remembrance of the Victims of Public Crimes which recognized memorial museums as a special type of museum, with their own unique characteristics and a very specific mission.

For four years, information was collected, people were interviewed, and eyewitnesses were sought.

Notable collaborators included Dr. Roberto Cassá, the president of the Dominican Academy of History and historians Emilio Cordero Michel, Francisco Henríquez, and Franklin Franco.

The project has continued to grow and gain national and international recognition. In 2005, it won a grant from the Ambassador's Fund for Cultural Preservation to digitize the collection. This scholarship opened the doors to the possibility of being eligible for the Memory of the World Programme. Later, in July 2009, the collection of the Dominican Resistance Memorial Museum would be registered as Memory of the World Programme by UNESCO.

In 2005, the museum suffered a setback when the house destined for the museum entered into litigation, the Testimony Foundation was divided and the Federation of Patriotic Foundations lost two members and the museum premises. Later and through the "Fundación Héroes del 30 de Mayo" they got a house on Calle Arzobispo Nouel, donated by the VICINI Group (now INICIA). Finally, the museum entered its semi-final phase.

After sixteen years of planning, in 2011, it finally opened its doors to the public as one of the most modern museums in the Caribbean.

== Museum ==
The Memorial Museum of Dominican Resistance collects, organizes, catalogs, preserves, investigates, disseminates and displays the assets of the tangible and intangible heritage of the resistance during the dictatorships of the Dominican Republic. Its mission is to shine light on the facts, testimonies and people who participated in the struggle for democracy.

It is a place to commemorate the fallen heroes. However, more than anything, it is an educational institution dedicated to raising awareness among new generations about the value of life and the fundamental rights of human beings to freedom where they can act upon and express their ideas without fear of losing family, dignity and life. It is also a place to commemorate those who perished during the struggle for democracy in the Dominican Republic during the 20th century.

The permanent exhibition begins with an explanatory preamble about what dictatorships are and the dismantling of a whole series of myths that the propaganda machine of the Rafael Trujillo regime created and rooted in the Dominican collective belief. The exhibition continues with a chronological journey with the preceding events from 1916, with the occupation of the United States in the Dominican Republic. Then it proceeds to show the Trujillo dictatorship and the Joaquín Balaguer dictatorship that ended in 1978.

The exhibition is made up of a variety of things ranging from the traditional display of objects to the presentation of a hologram and dramatization of an animatronic. This is complemented by a wide range of audiovisual material.

== Location ==
It is located at 210 Arzobispo Nouel Street in the Colonial City of Santo Domingo and is one of the main tourist attractions in the area.
