= Ciudad Colonial (Santo Domingo) =

Historic district in Dominican Republic

- Historic district
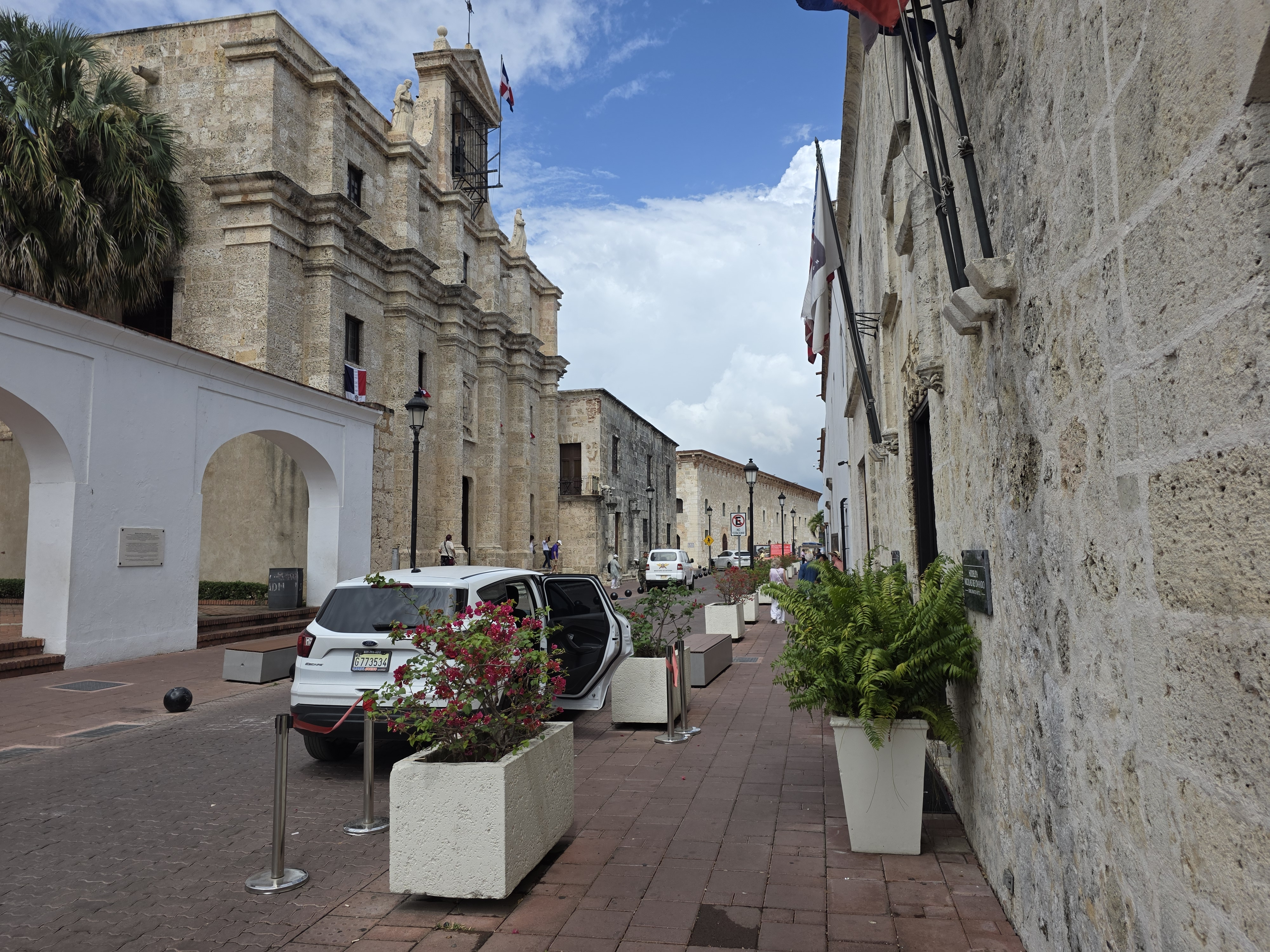
- Las Damas Street, Santo Domingo, Colonial Zone

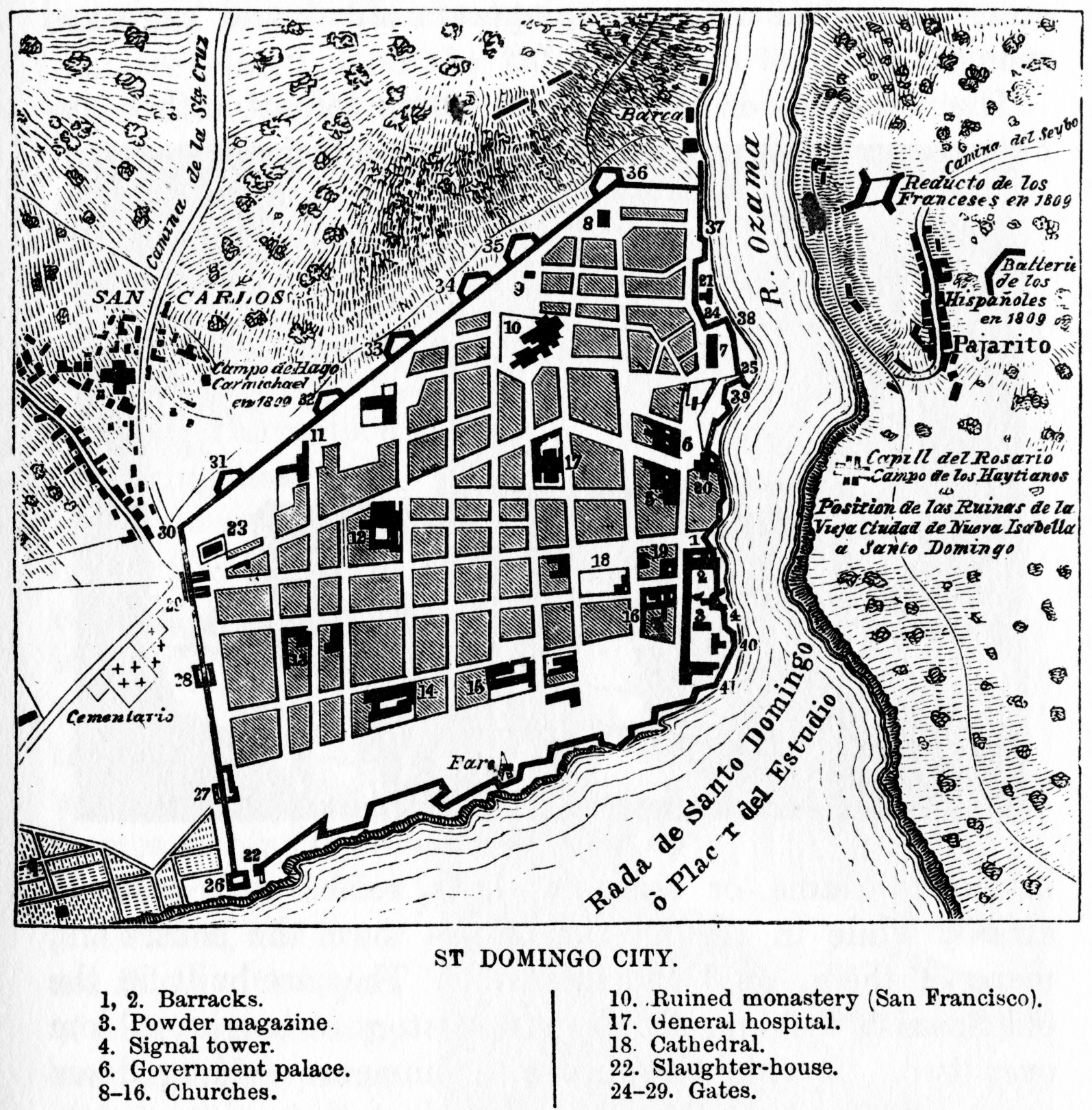
- Map of Santo Domingo, 1873

- Location within the Dominican Republic
- Coordinates: 18°29′N 69°55′W
- Country: Dominican Republic
- Province: Distrito Nacional
- City: Santo Domingo
- Established: 1502

Government
  - Mayor: Carolina Mejía (PRM)
- Time zone: UTC-4
- Postal code: 10210

UNESCO World Heritage Site
- Official name: Colonial City of Santo Domingo
- Location: Santo Domingo, Dominican Republic
- Includes: Alcázar de Colón; Puerta del Conde; Fortaleza Ozama; Monasterio de San Francisco; Cathedral of Santo Domingo
- Criteria: Cultural: (ii), (iv), (vi)
- Reference: 526
- Inscription: 1990 (14th Session)
- Area: 106 ha (0.41 sq mi)

Ciudad Colonial (Spanish pronunciation: [sjuˈðað koloˈnjal]; lit. 'Colonial City') is the historic central neighborhood of the Dominican Republic's capital Santo Domingo. It is the oldest continuously inhabited European-established settlement in the Americas. The area has been declared a World Heritage Site by UNESCO. It is also known as Zona Colonial (Colonial Zone) or more colloquially as "La Zona" (The Zone).

The Ciudad Colonial is located on the west bank of the Ozama River, directly and continuously merging into the eastern disadvantaged neighborhoods of the city center of the modern city of Santo Domingo, namely Distrito Nacional. It covers 1.06 km^{2} (0.41 sq mi) bounded by scattered, discontiguous portions of a largely demolished walled perimeter. It contains several landmarks dating back to the early 16th century, including Alcázar de Colón, Fortaleza Ozama, and Catedral de Santa María la Menor, all located within the extreme southeastern part of the colonial city, which is the only area of the city that preserves most of its colonial character. It is the main tourist attraction of Santo Domingo, even though the main sites of governmental and commercial activity are now in the more Polígono Central area of Distrito Nacional.

== History ==
The first settlement of what is now Santo Domingo was established by Bartholomew Columbus on the East bank of the Ozama River near the end of the 15th century. After the 1502 hurricane that claimed Francisco de Bobadilla among its victims; however, the city was relocated on the West bank under the leadership of Nicolás de Ovando. Ovando and his successor Diego Colón presided over the first constructions of the Colonial City, many of which still exist today. Santo Domingo's fortifications were an important feature of the urban landscape. The defense wall (muralla) extended from the Ozama River to the Puerta del Conde, which was the entrance to the hinterland and the Western boundary of the city until the late 19th century.

The Spaniards used this settlement as the first point of influence in the Americas, from which they conquered other Caribbean islands and much of the mainland of the Americas. Santo Domingo was initially the political and cultural hub of Spanish presence in the new world, but after a few decades started to decline as the Spaniards focused their attention more on the mainland after conquering Mexico, Peru, and other regions of Latin America. Ciudad Colonial nevertheless remained an important historical site.

In 1655, the Ciudad Colonial was submitted to a siege led by the English officers William Penn and Robert Venables. The 1655 invasion was thwarted by Spanish troops commanded by the Captain General of the Colony, Don Bernardino de Meneses y Bracamonte, Count of Peñalva, to whom the Puerta del Conde ("Gate of the Count") is named after. The defensive wall was modified during this episode. Prior to the invasion, there was a fort at the site where the Puerta del Conde is today, Fuerte San Genaro. It is believed that the modification that occurred after the siege involved the expansion of the wall to the fort, effectively creating a bastion, El Baluarte del Conde.

In the late 19th century and early 20th century, the city started to expand beyond its old boundaries but the Ciudad Colonial remained the main hub of activity until the Trujillo era. Trujillo also presided over the restoration of major monuments, including the Alcázar de Colón in the early 1950s.

== Colonial City today ==
The central public space of the district is Parque Colón, a square that borders the 16th-century Cathedral and has a late-19th-century bronze statue of Christopher Columbus in its center. East of Parque Colón, the cobblestone Calle Las Damas is the New World's oldest paved street, dating from 1502. The street is bordered by many of the zone's more prominent landmarks, including Fortaleza Ozama, a site of several major events in Dominican history; Casa de Bastidas, which now houses a children's museum; the French Embassy, in a building said to have been the house of Hernán Cortés; the Casa de Ovando, said to be the former residence of Governor Nicolás de Ovando and now a luxury hotel called Hodelpa Nicolas de Ovando; the National Pantheon of the Dominican Republic; and the Museo de las Casas Reales, in the former governors' palace and Audiencia building.

Calle del Conde is a pedestrian-only street that includes several notable commercial buildings of the early 20th century and connects Parque Colon with the Puerta del Conde and Parque Independencia. Another traditional commercial district is the portion of Avenida Duarte just north of the Zona Colonial, which is currently undergoing a renovation plan that aims to make the area more appealing to tourists.

On the north end of Calle Las Damas, the restored and expanded Plaza de España is bordered by Las Atarazanas (former naval yard, now a museum) and a number of small shops and restaurants. This area was one of the first commercial centers in the Americas, and is still a hub of activity today. The Alcázar de Colón, having once been the colonial palace of the Columbus family—beginning with his son Diego—is now a museum displaying period furniture and decorations. The building was originally built in 1510, and restored to its current appearance in 1952.

A US$700 million investment was made in the Port of Ozama adjacent to the Ciudad Colonial aiming to turn Santo Domingo into a port of call for luxury cruise ships and including a privately owned marina. The project is being completed by Sans Soucí Ports S.A.

== Historical sites of Ciudad Colonial ==
In the Ciudad Colonial there are more than 300 historical sites, including various monuments of cultural and historical character, houses of important figures in the colonial society and important streets, such as the Las Damas street. Some of these are:

- Alcázar de Colón, first castle or viceroyal residence in the Americas. Today houses a 22-room museum
- Altar of the Fatherland, tombs of the founding fathers
- Basilica Cathedral of Santa María la Menor, First Cathedral of the Americas
- Casa de Rodrigo de Bastidas, once home to the prominent Bastidas family, now a children's museum (Museo Infantil)
- Casa del Cordón, built by the Garay family, perhaps the oldest still-erect stone building of the New World (1502) with a beautifully carved door frame in the form of a Franciscan friar's rope belt (cordón)
- Casa de la Moneda or House of the Currency, built in 1540 with a door surrounded by five sculpted medallions in the early Renaissance style, today houses a museum of colonial coins
- Casa of the Dávila Family (One of the 3 houses that makes Hodelpa Nicolas de Ovando Hotel)
- Casa de Nicolás de Ovando, today part of the Hodelpa Nicolas de Ovando
- Casa de Diego Caballero
- Casa de Campuzano Polanco, later Casa de los Presidentes, now Arzobispado de Santo Domingo
- Calle de los Nichos or del Arquillo chico, previously Calle del Mono in the 16th–17th centuries and Calle de los Polancos in the 18th century, today calle Pellerano Alfau, which is a pedestrian street. Both the Casa de Diego Caballero and the Campuzano Polanco are located in this street
- Casa de Alonso de Zuazo, governor of Santo Domingo, located in front of the Campuzano Polanco residence, today Auditorio del Arzobispado
- Casa de Hernán Cortés, thought to be the former house of Hernán Cortés, later became the residence of the Oviedo family. Today houses the French Embassy
- Casa de Diego del Rio, located next to the Casa de Alonso de Zuazo in Calle Las Damas, today houses the KahKow experience museum about the cacao of the island
- Casas de Gaspar de Astudillo, next to the above, located next to each other in front of the gate of Casa de Bastidas. Today, one floors houses the Sociedad Dominicana de Bibliofilos and the other floor houses the Dominican Lions Club
- Casa of the Gargoyles, located at the beginning of the Calle de las Mercedes next to Casa of the Jesuits, it was the seat of the University of Santiago de la Paz and of Gorjón founded by the Jesuits in the middle of the 16th century
- Casa of the Jesuits, located on the intersection of Las Damas Street and Las Mercedes, was the seat of the University of Santiago de la Paz and Gorjón in the mid-eighteenth century
- Casa de Juan de Villoria, sugar mill owner and testamentary executor of Diego Columbus, located next to the Casa of the Gargoyles, today houses the Fundación Dominicana de Desarrollo (FDD)
- Casa de Juan de Ampies, founder of the city of Coro and first Governor of Venezuela, next to the above (turned into one single house today), later became the residence of Genoese merchant Melchor Centurione, business partner of Juan de Villoria, today part of the FDD as well
- Casa del Sacramento, built by the Garay family, now Arzobispado de Santo Domingo
- Casa de "El Tapado", built by Dean Pedro Duque de Rivera in the middle of the 16th century. Takes its name from the legend of one of its residents who only came out at night. The legend says he was a Spanish noble with a disfigured face
- Casa de Tostado, built in 1505 by scribe Francisco Tostado, father of the first poet of America, Francisco Tostado de la Peña (d. 1586), who was killed in the Invasion of Francis Drake. Today houses the Museum of the Dominican Family of the 19th century of furniture and antiquities (Museo de la Familia Dominicana del siglo XIX). The house is the only civilian building in the New World with a gothic period window
- Calle El Conde
- Calle Las Damas, oldest street of the Americas
- Calle Las Mercedes
- Chapel de los Remedios of the Dávila Family
- Chapel and Hospital of San Andrés, second oldest hospital in America
- Church and Convent of the Dominican Order, oldest church in the New World
- Chapel del Rosario inside the Church and Convent of the Dominican Order, also known as the Chapel of the Zodiac, built by the Campuzano Polanco family in early 18th century. The only one of its kind in America and one of the four vaults with astrological representations that exist today in the world
- Chapel of the Dominican Third Order, next to the Church of the Dominican Order
- Church Hospital San Lázaro
- Church of the Jesuits, today Panteón Nacional
- Church Las Mercedes, once the residence of Tirso de Molina between 1616 and 1618 and probably where he wrote part of his works
- Church of Nuestra Señora de la Altagracia, built in 1502 by Nicolas de Ovando, rebuilt in 1920
- Church Nuestra Señora del Carmen
- Church Regina Angelorum, residence of Leonor de Ovando and Elvira de Mendoza, first poets of America
- Church of Santa Bárbara
- Church of San Miguel
- Ceiba of Columbus
- Colonial Sewer, built by Nicolás de Ovando in 1502. The entrance to one of its tunnels is in front of the Museum of Rum and Cane
- Convento Santa Clara
- Fort of El Angulo
- Fort of La Carena
- Fort of La Caridad
- Fort of La Concepción
- Fort of El Invencible, part of the defense of the Ozama River built by the Dávila family
- Fort of San Diego
- Fort of San Gil, built around 1505, the first defense of the Ciudad Colonial
- Fort of San José
- Fortaleza Ozama, oldest fortress in America
- Statue of Gonzalo Fernández de Oviedo y Valdés, inside the Ozama Fortress
- Gate de la Misericordia
- Gate de San Diego, built in 1576, main entrance to the colonial zone from the sea
- Hermitage of San Antón
- Hospital San Nicolás de Bari, oldest hospital built in the Americas
- Modelo Market, largest souvenir shop in the Ciudad Colonial
- Monasterio de San Francisco, original burial place of Alonso de Ojeda and Bartholomew Columbus
- Museo de las Casas Reales, before the Palace of the Real Audiencia of Santo Domingo, today a museum with 9 rooms on the colonial history of the island considered one of the best in the Caribbean
- Museo de la Catedral, previously was La Carcel Vieja in colonial times (The Old Jail), then became the theater of the Filantropica society. Today houses a museum of religious objects from the Cathedral of the 16th to 19th centuries
- Museo de Juan Pablo Duarte, in the house where the Dominican Republic's national hero was born
- Memorial Museum of Dominican Resistance, honoring the struggles against the Trujillo and Balaguer regimes
- Museo del Ambar, or Amber World Museum, located in front of the Columbus Park. Contains a collection of amber from the country with historical and scientific data
- Museo Larimar, museum about a gemstone only found on the island, located in the Isabel La Católica street
- Museo Naval de las Atarazanas, naval and underwater archeology museum of the island
- Parque Colón (Columbus Park)
- Palace Consistoral, building of the first city hall of America
- Palace of Borgellá
- Park Independencia
- Plaza de España
- Plaza Fray Bartolomé de las Casas
- Plaza Duarte
- Plaza María de Toledo, next to the Church of the Jesuits (today National Pantheon)
- Plaza and statue of Antonio de Montesinos
- Plaza Pellerano Castro
- Plazoleta de los Curas, the oldest cemetery in America was once located here
- Plazoleta Padre Billini
- Puerta del Conde
- Reales Atarazanas, first customs offices and real warehouses of America, originally managed by the Welser Family
- Sun Clock, in front of the Museo de las Casas Reales, built in 1753 by governor Francisco Rubio y Peñaranda
- Steps of Las Damas

== Gallery ==
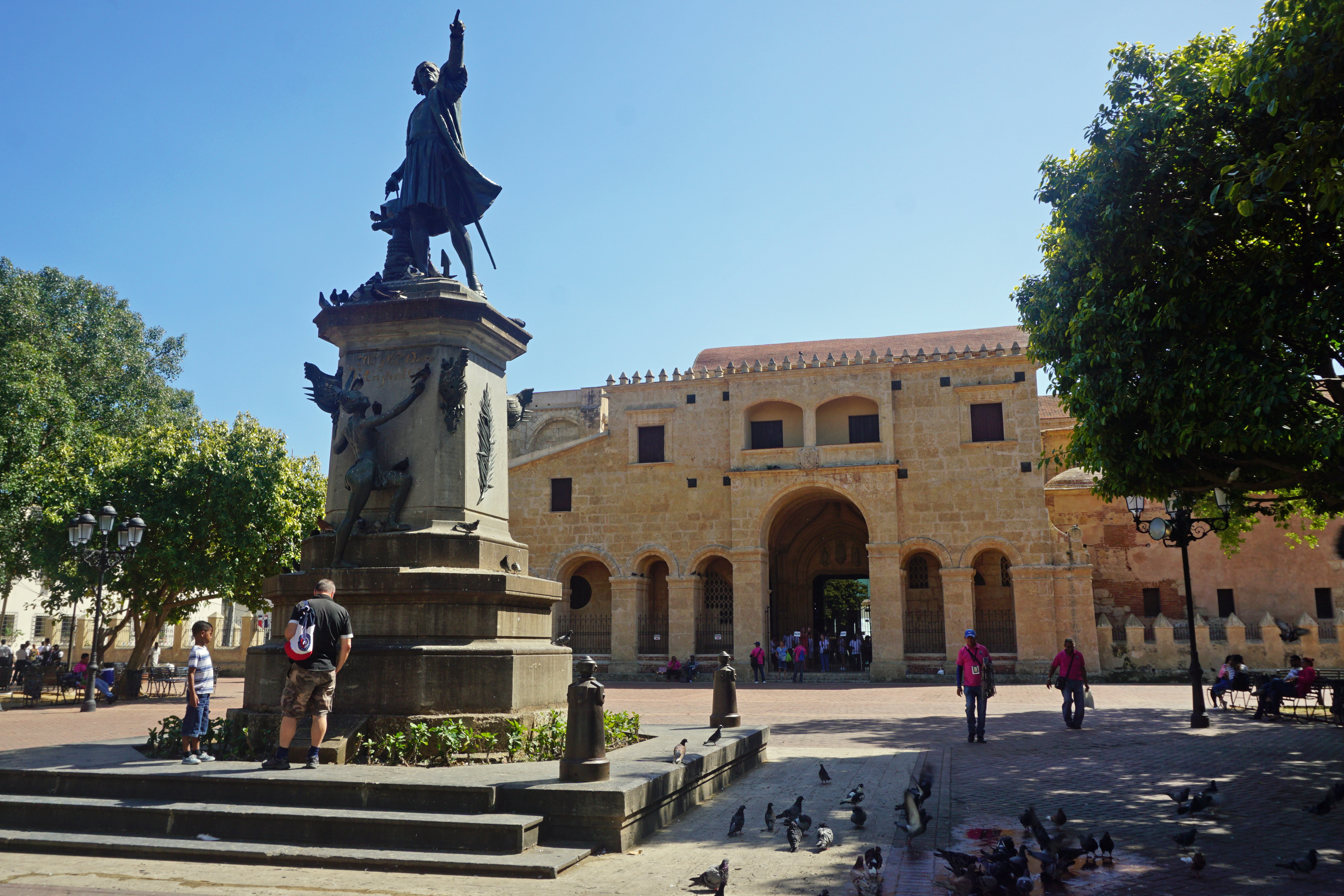
Parque Colón

Calle El Conde

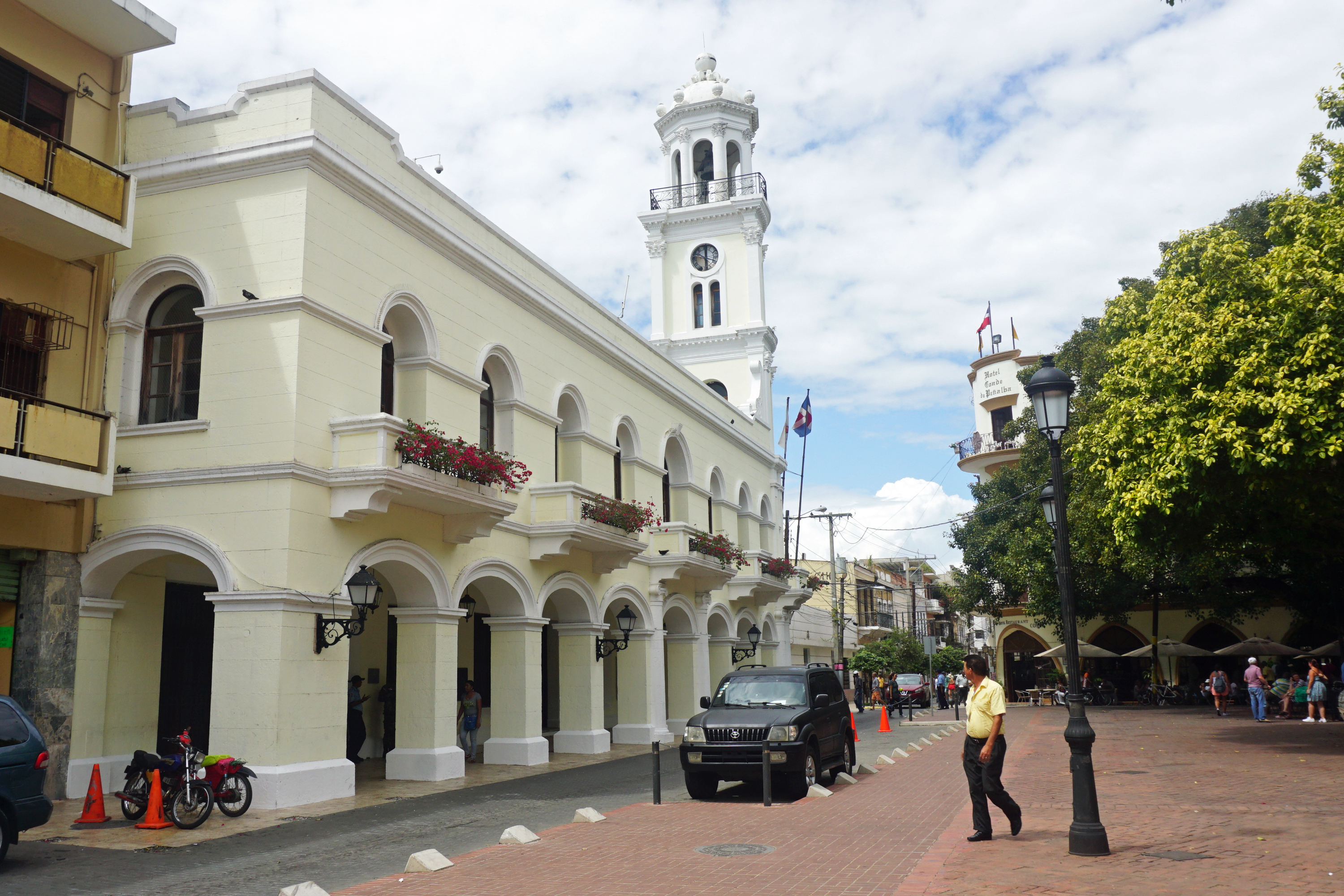
Palacio Consistorial

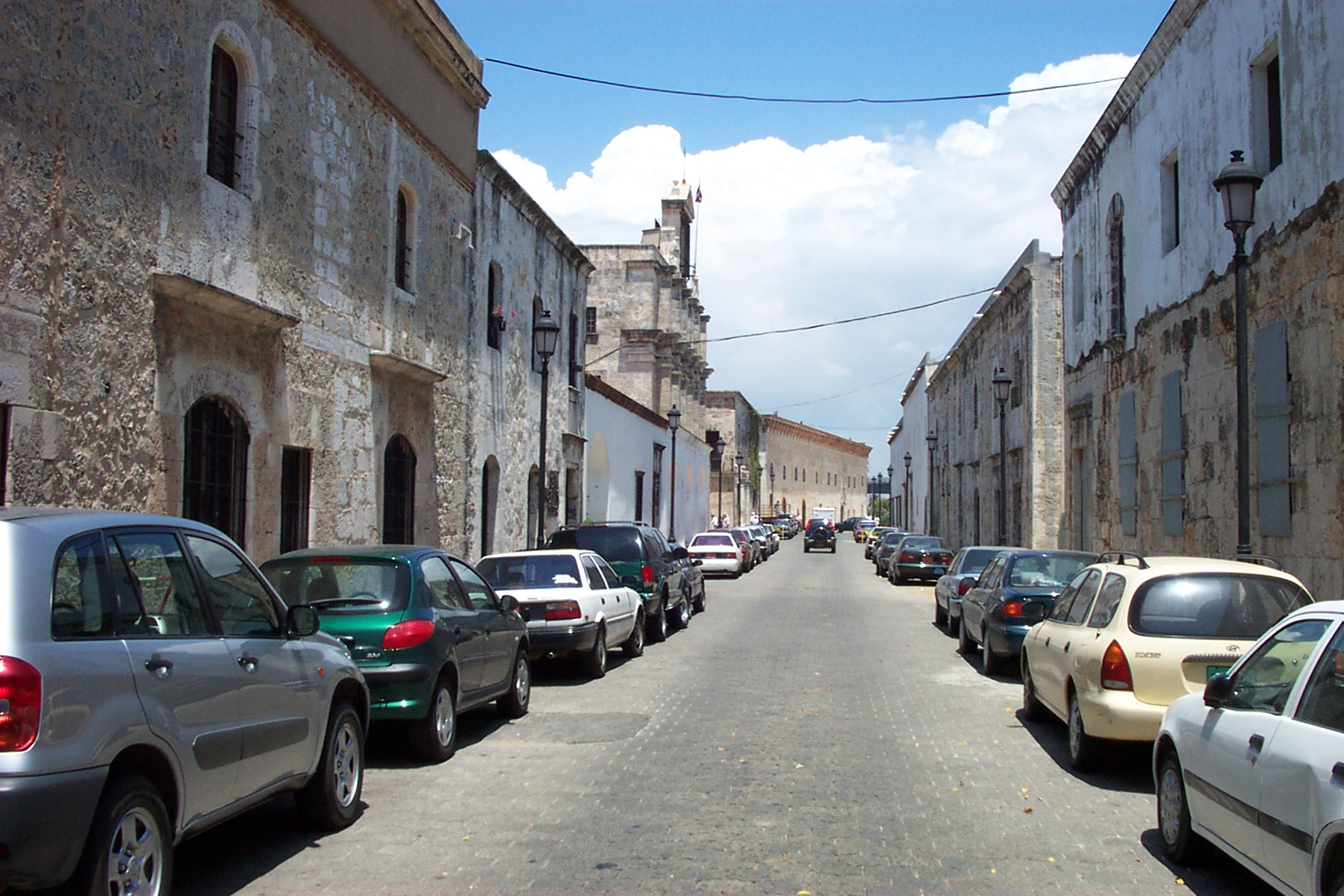
Calle Las Damas

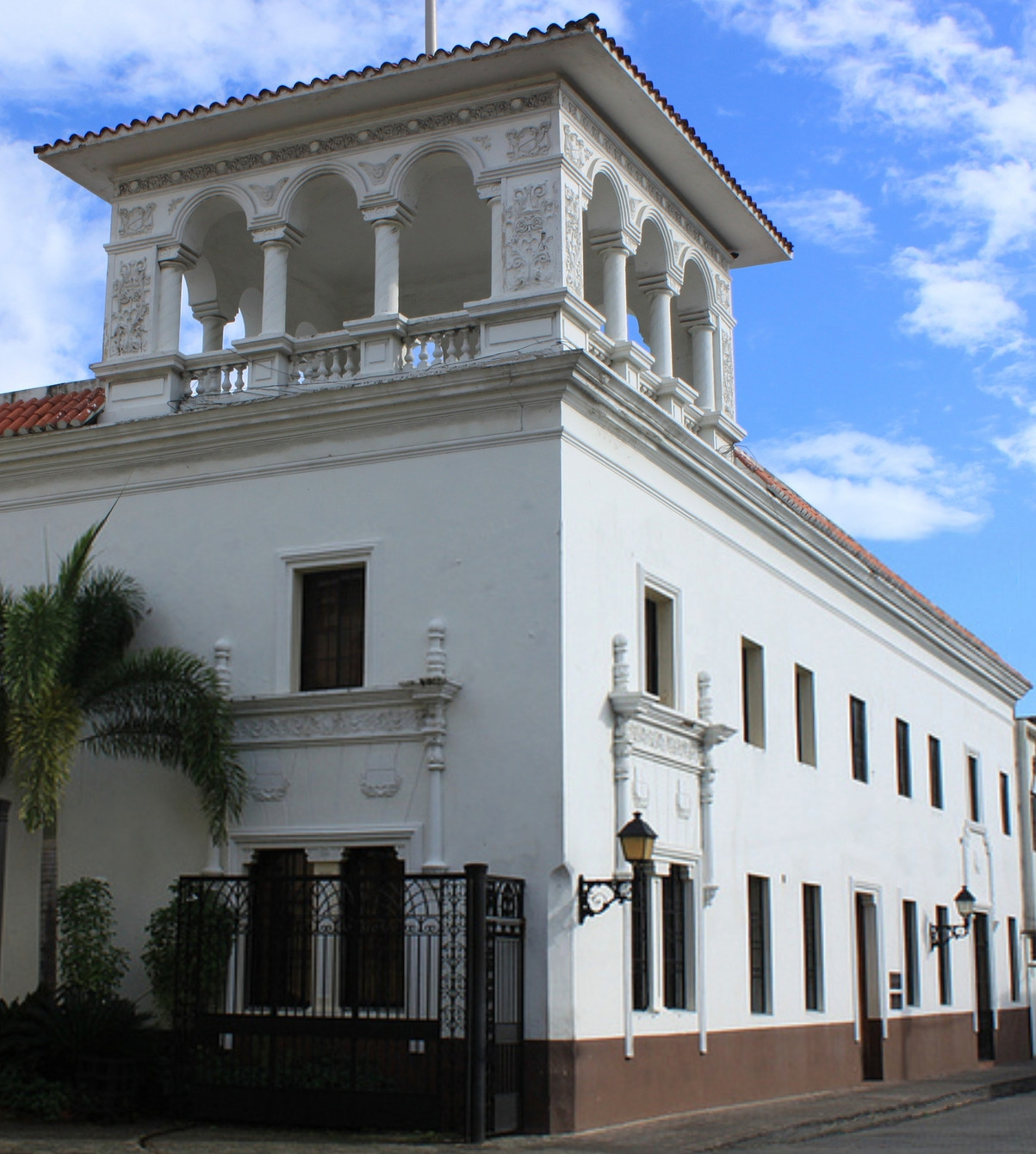
Casa del Sacramento

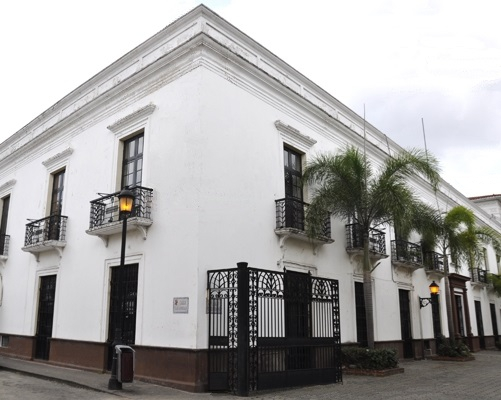
Casa de los Presidentes

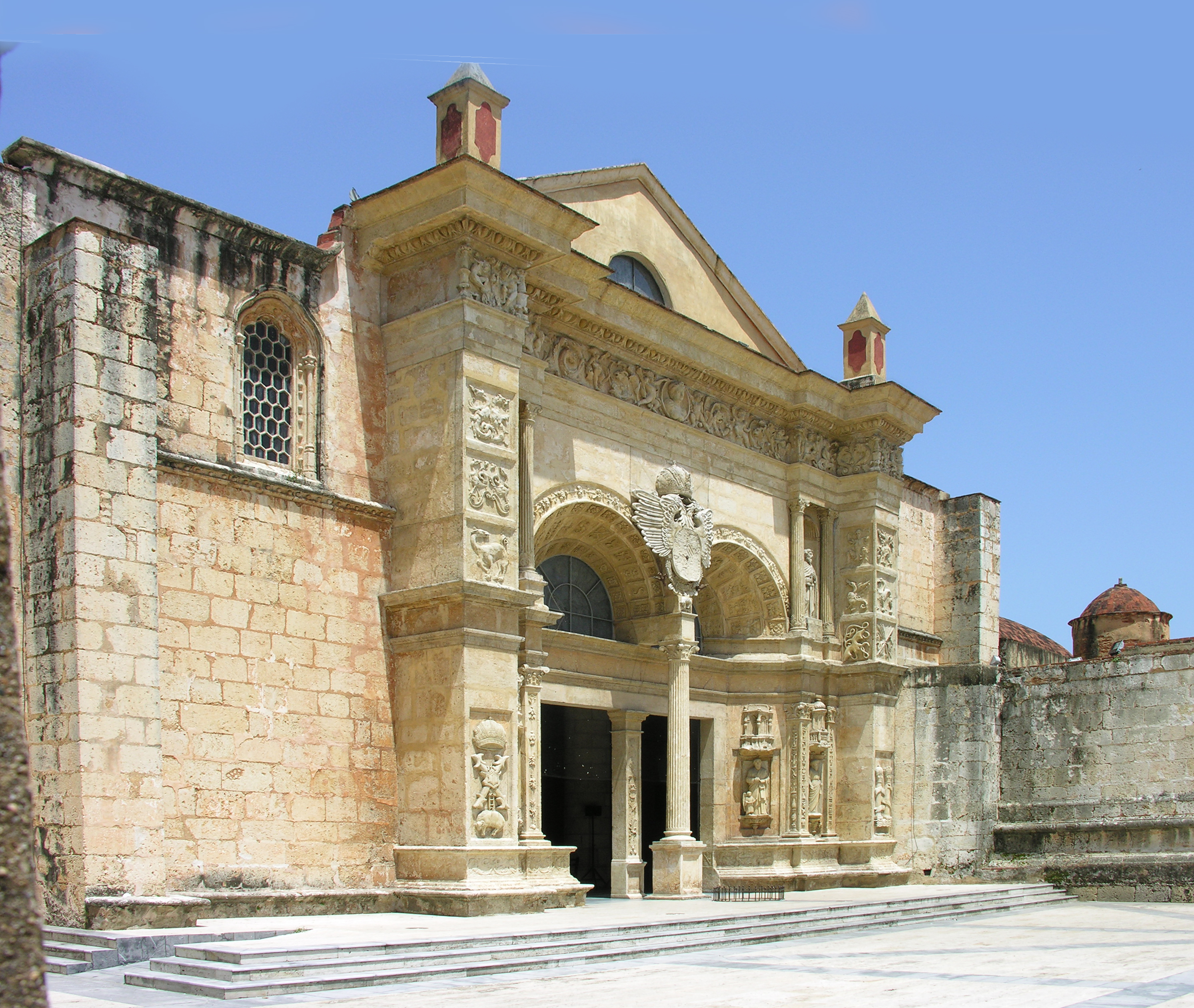
Cathedral, West facade

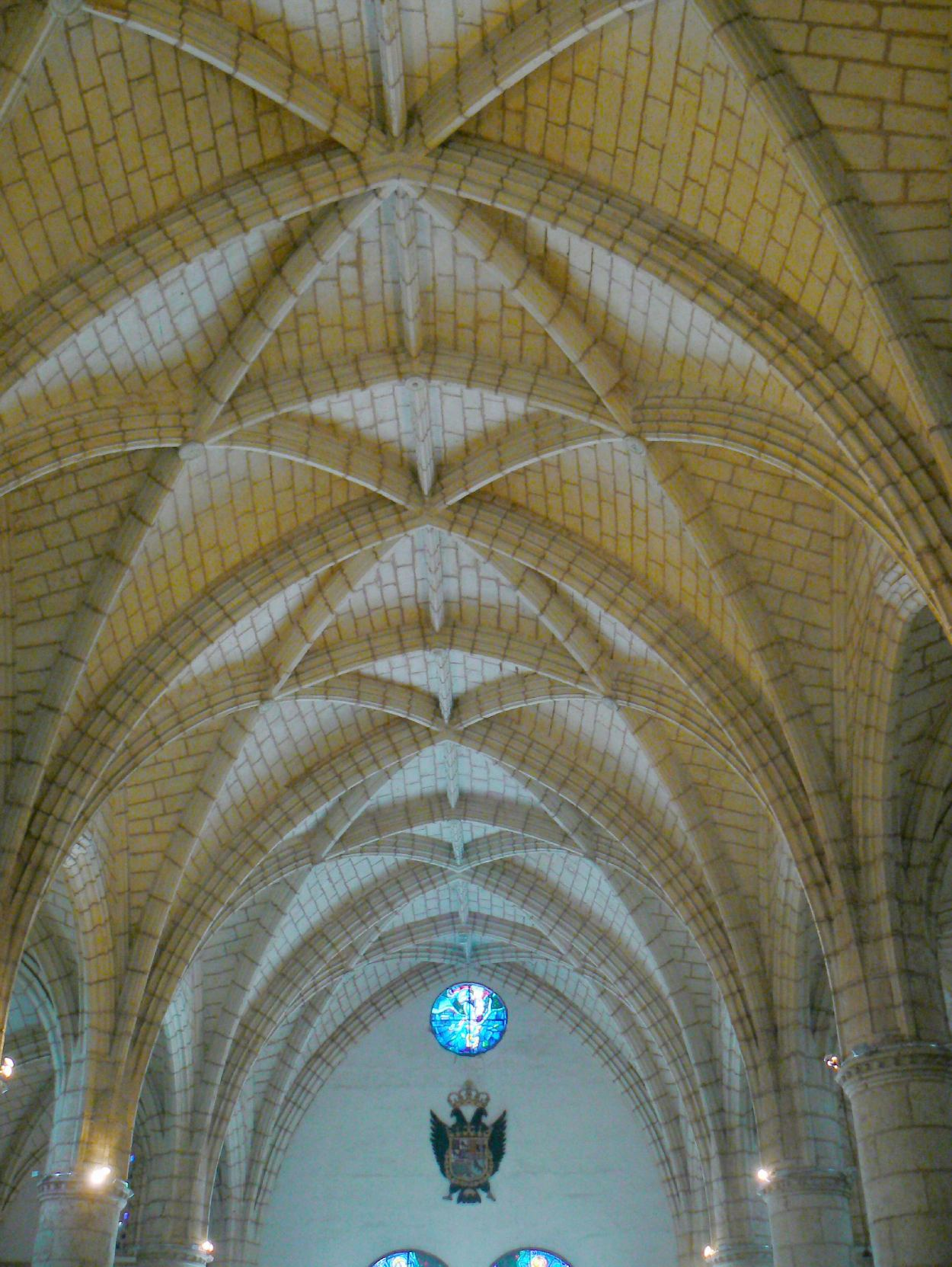
Cathedral, interior

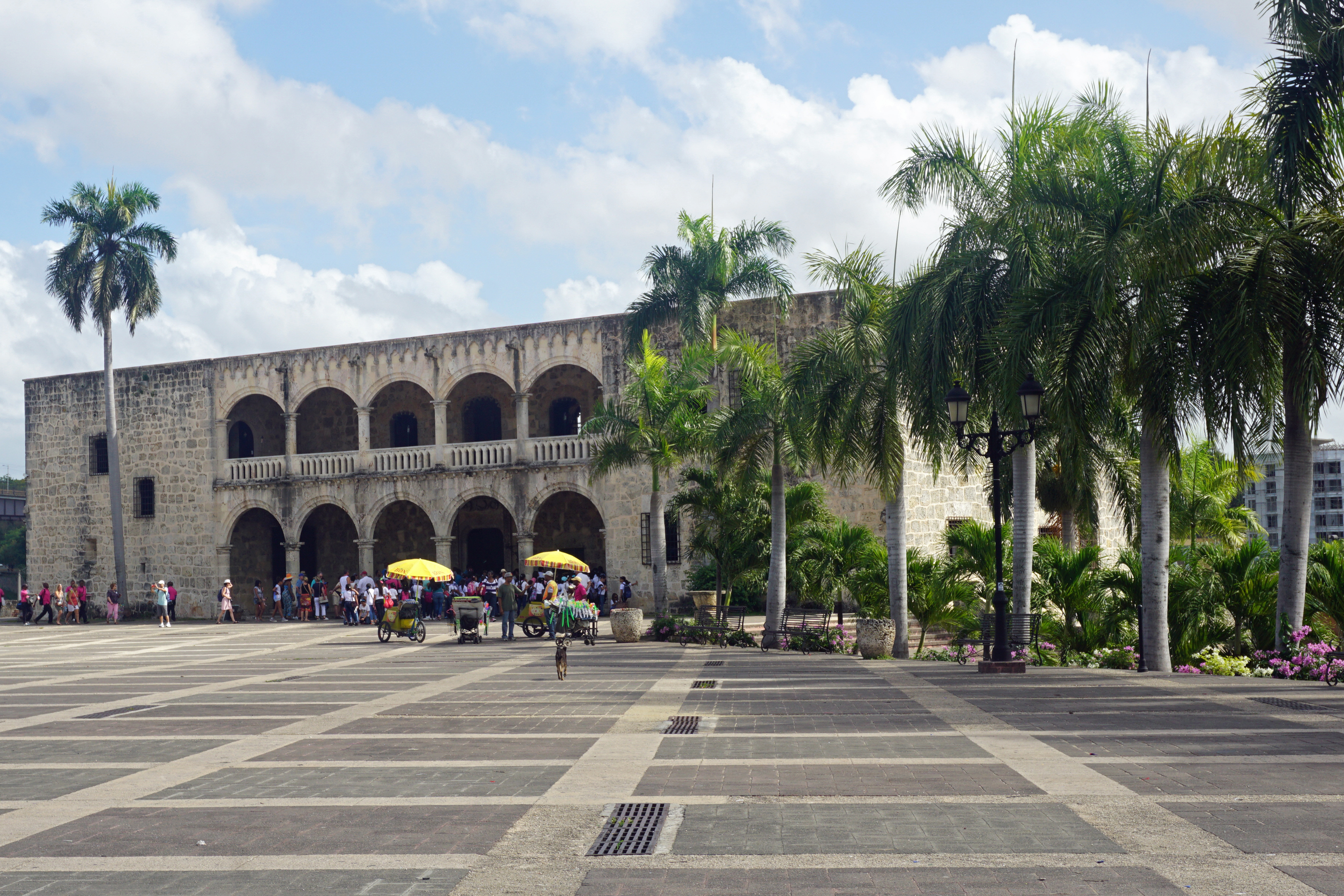
Alcázar de Colón and Plaza de España

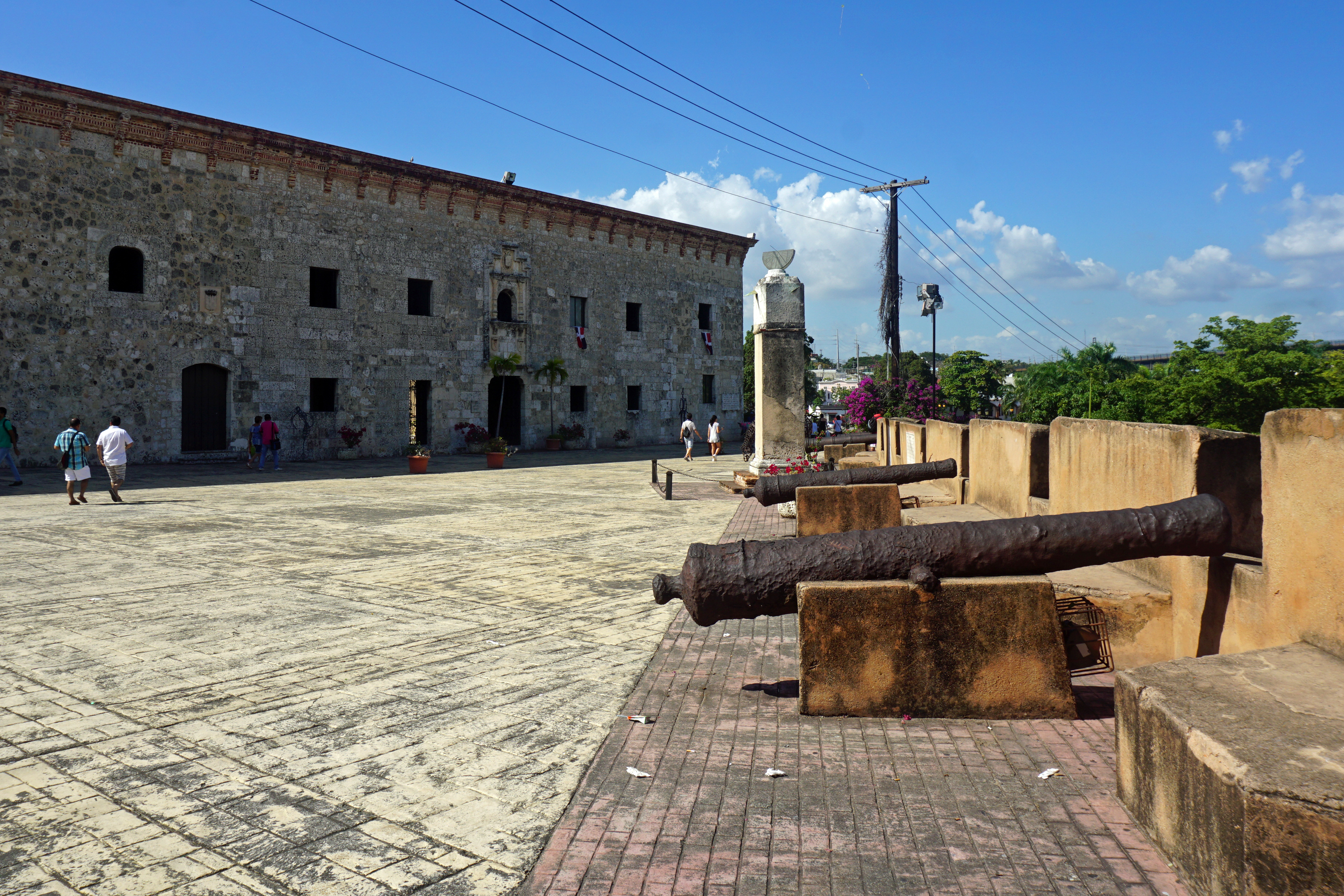
Museo de las Casas Reales

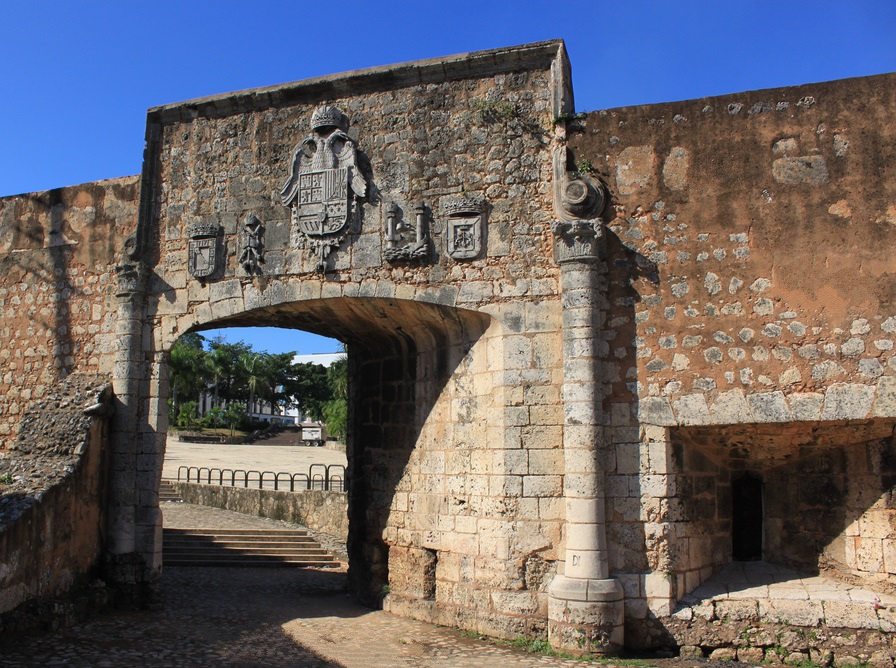
Puerta de San Diego

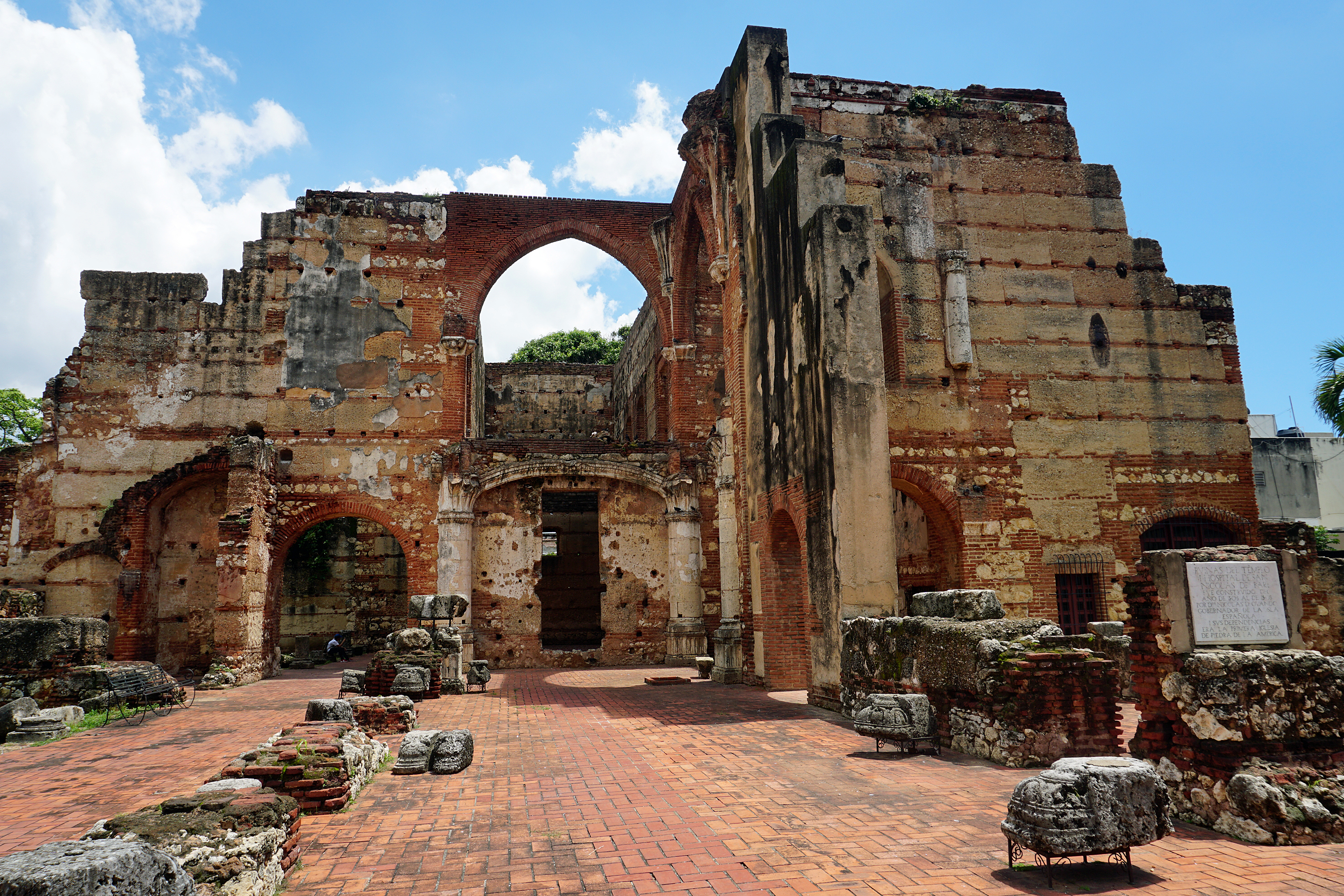
Ruinas Hospital San Nicolas de Bari

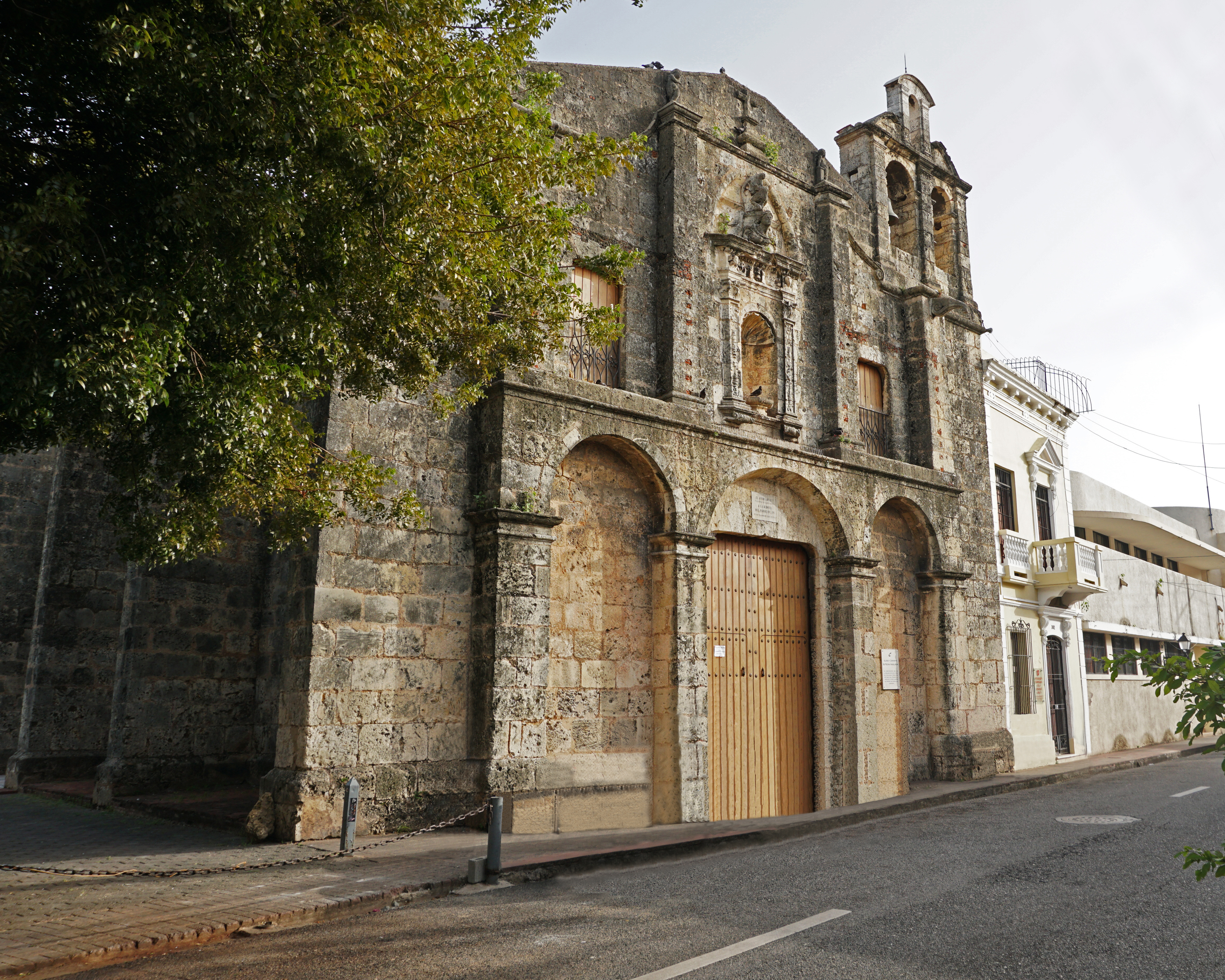
Iglesia Regina Angelorum

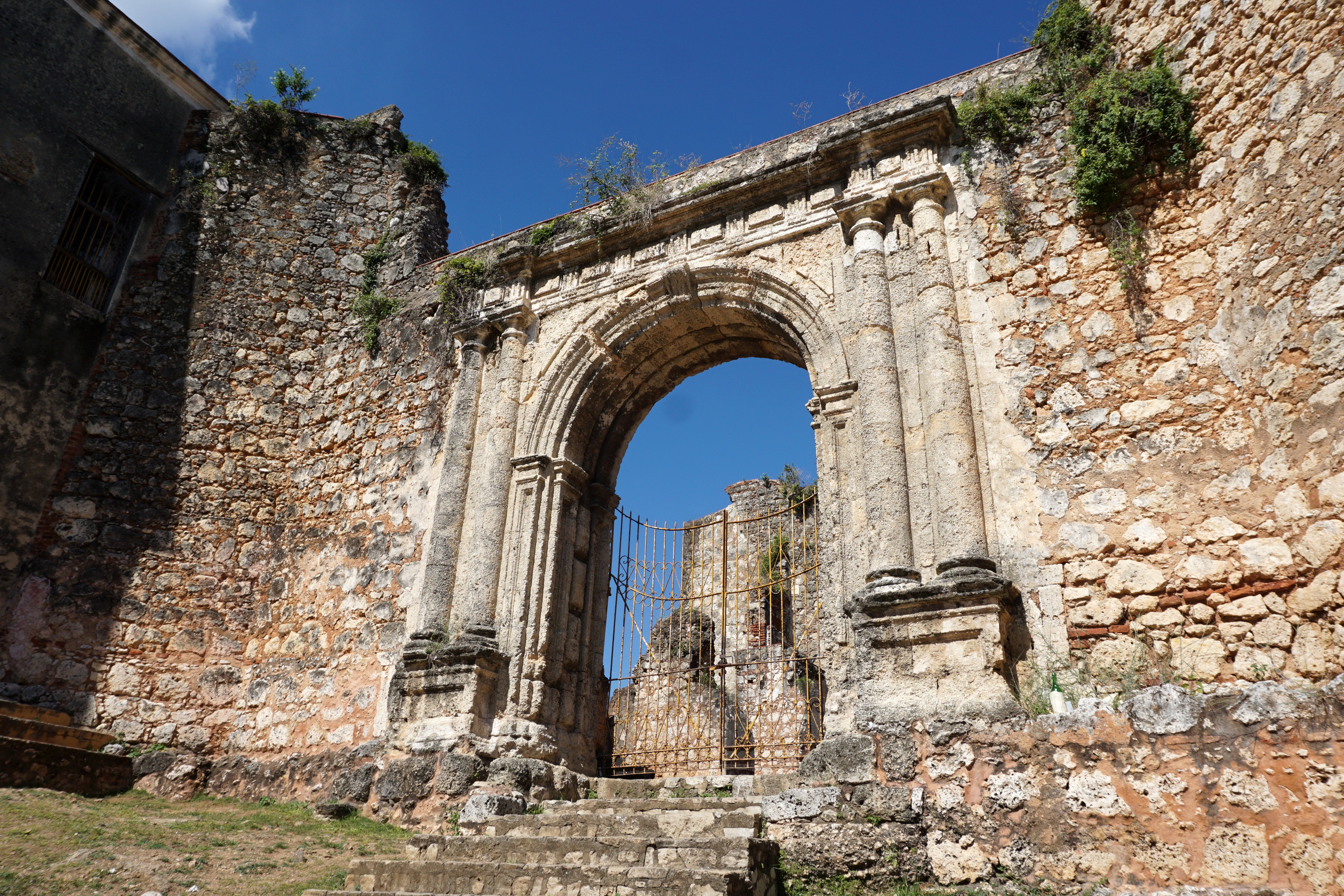
Ruinas Monasterio de San Francisco

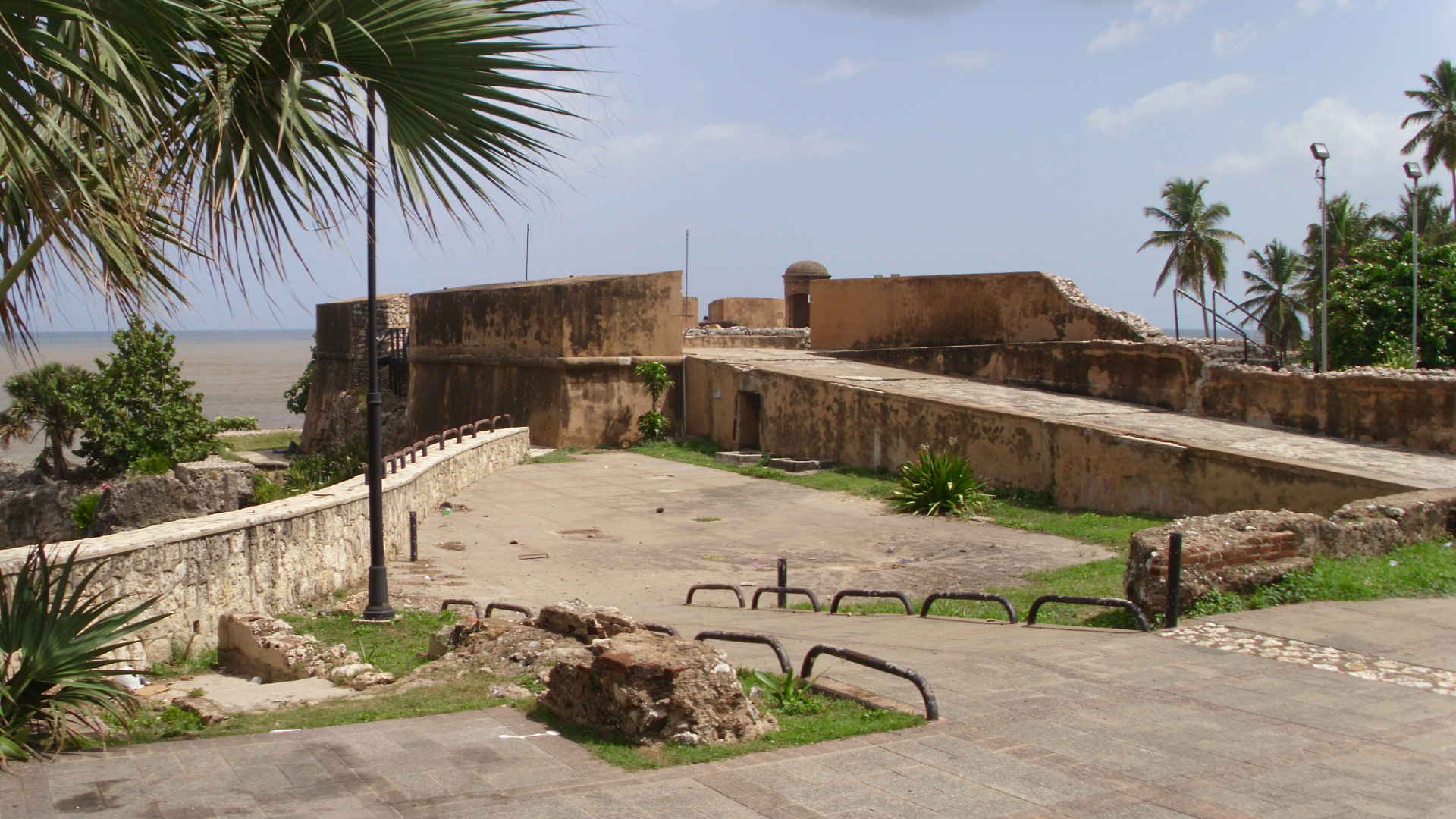
Fort of San Gil

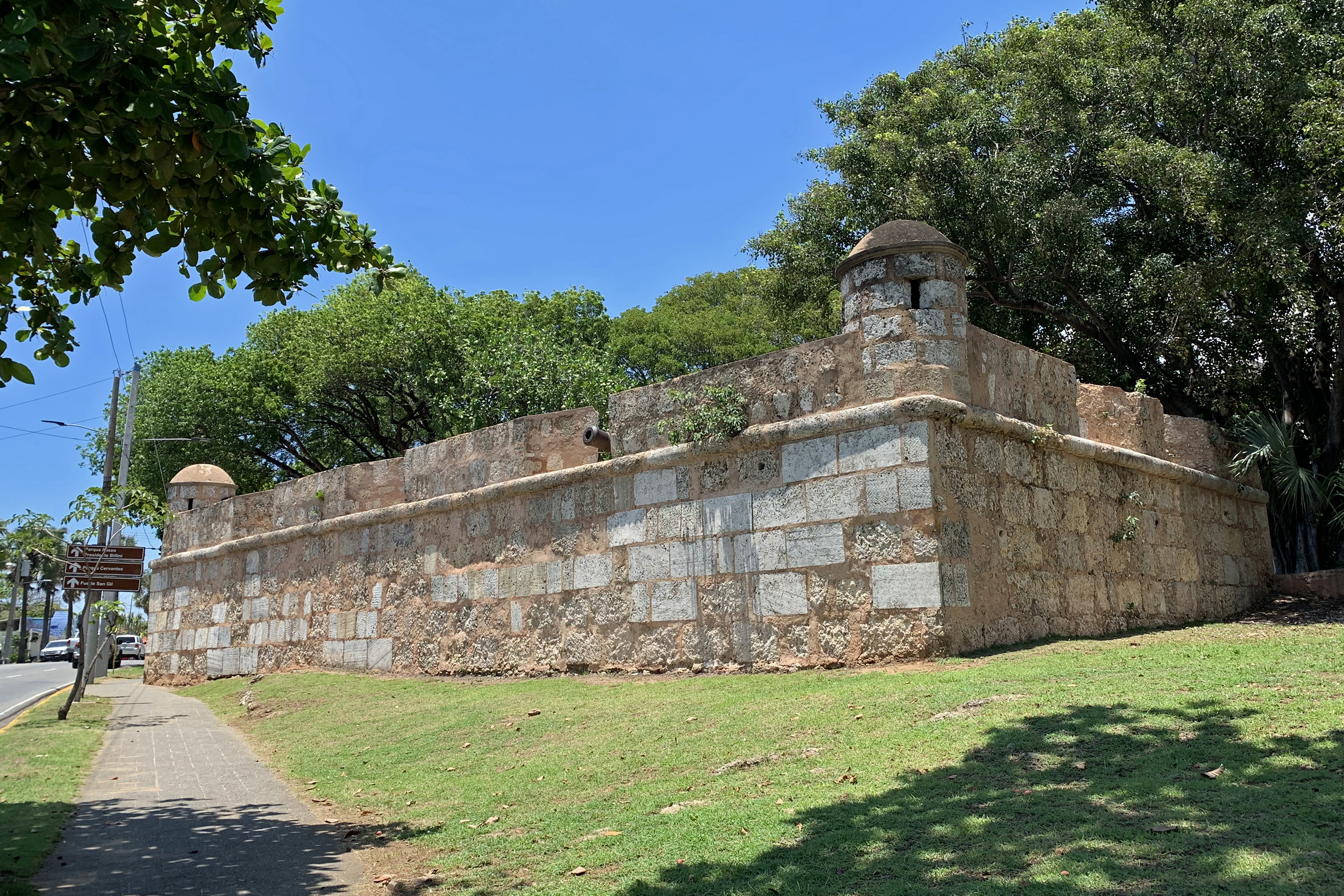
Bastion San Jose

Casa de Rodrigo de Bastidas

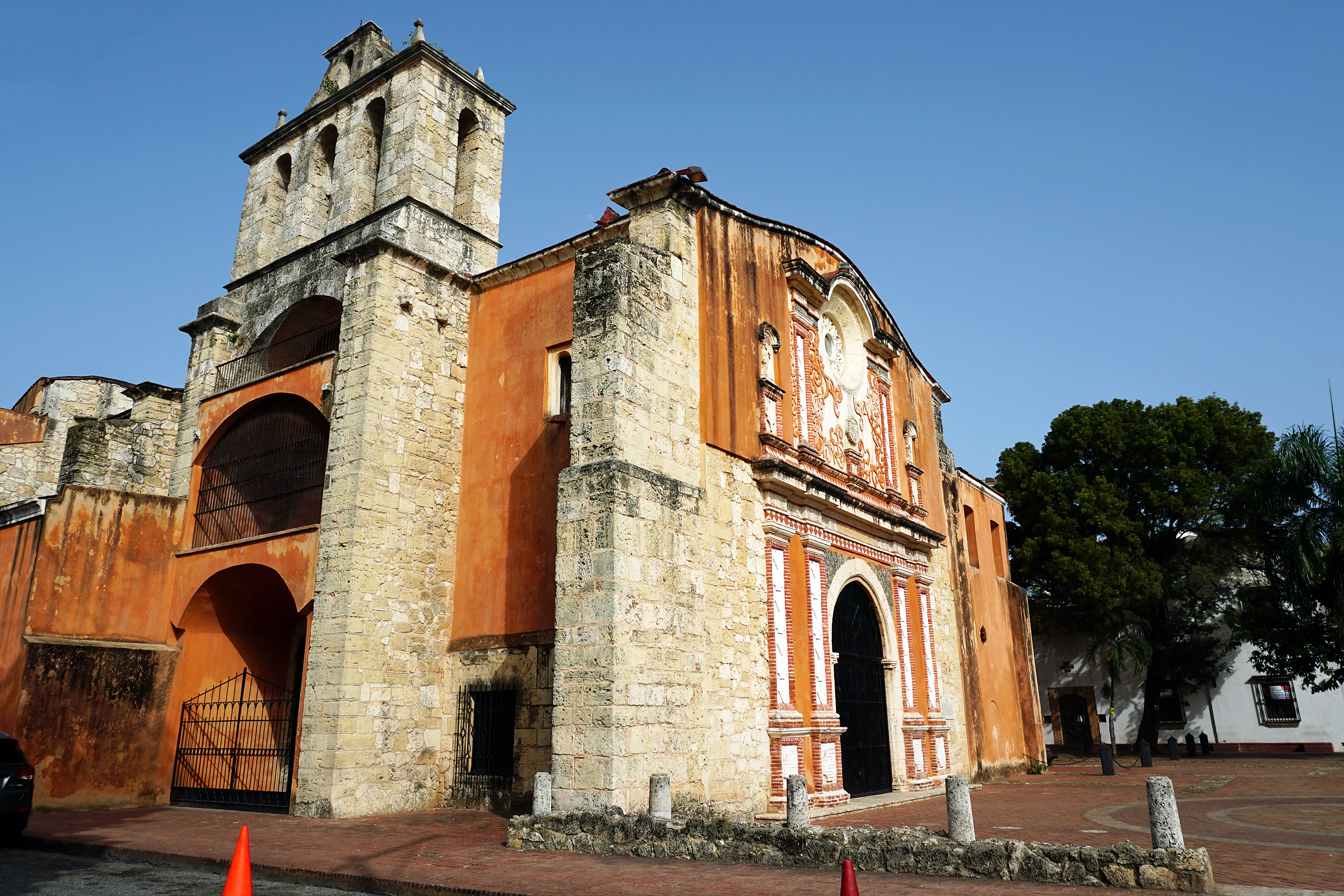
Iglesia y Convento de los Dominicos

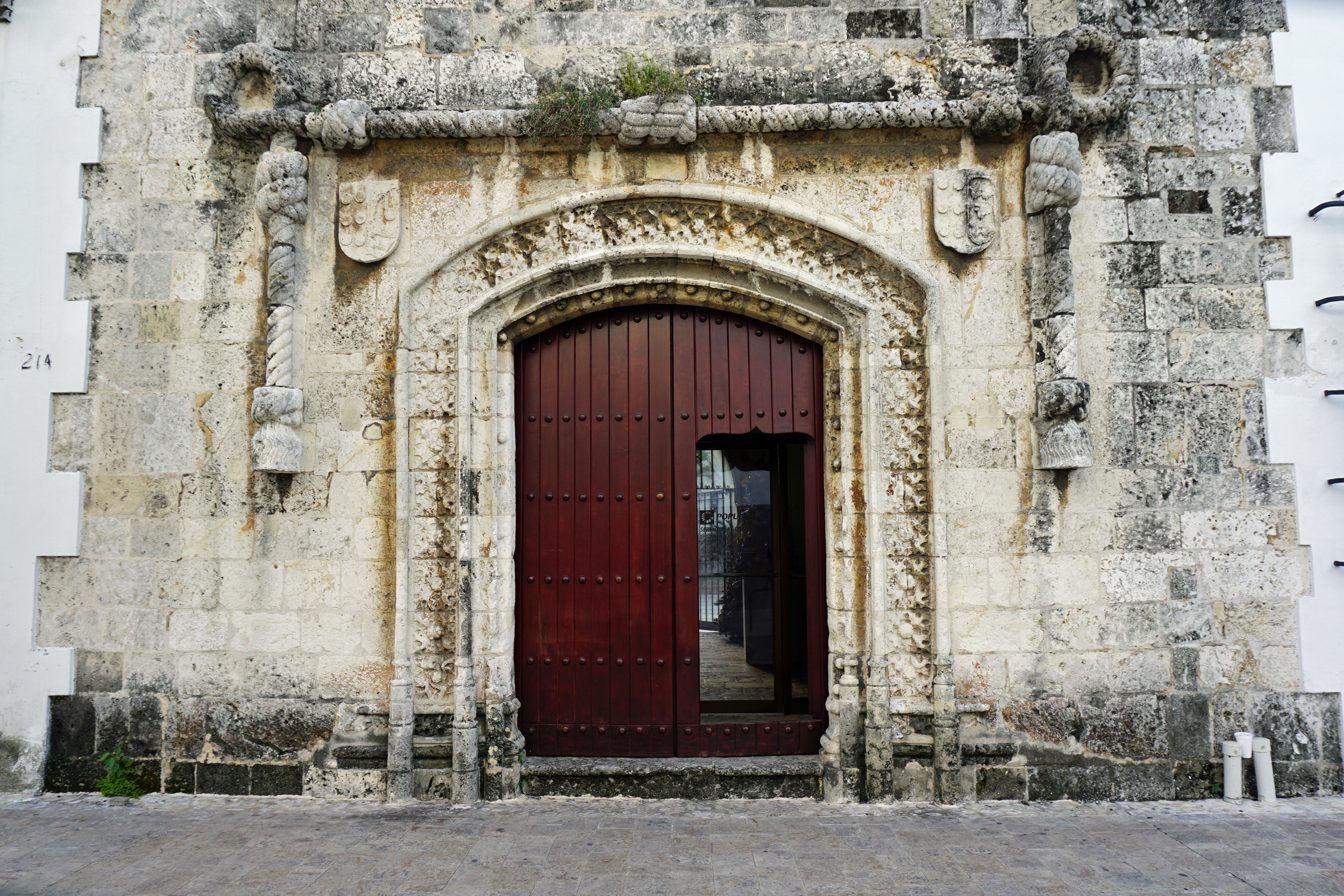
Casa del Cordon

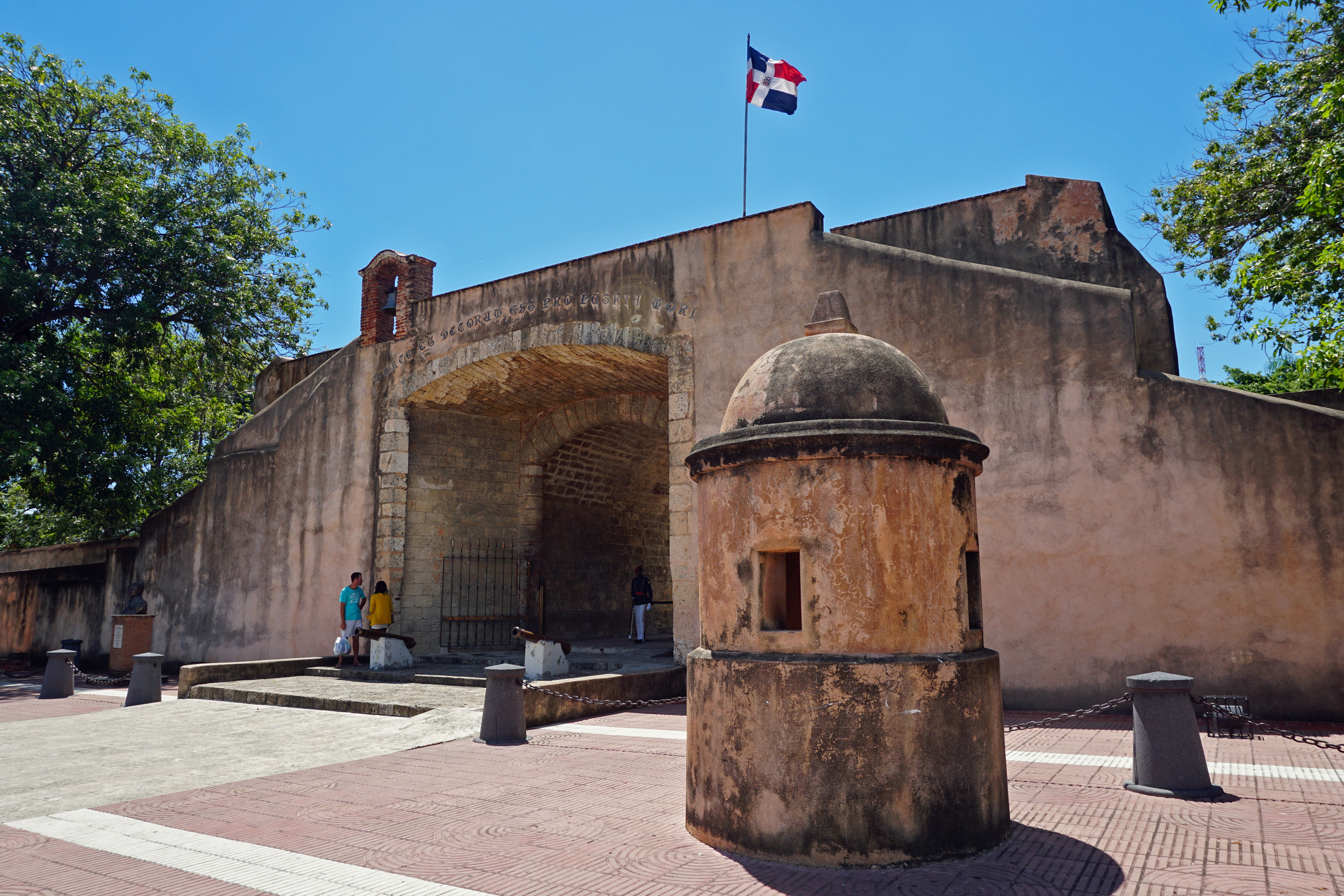
Puerta del Conde

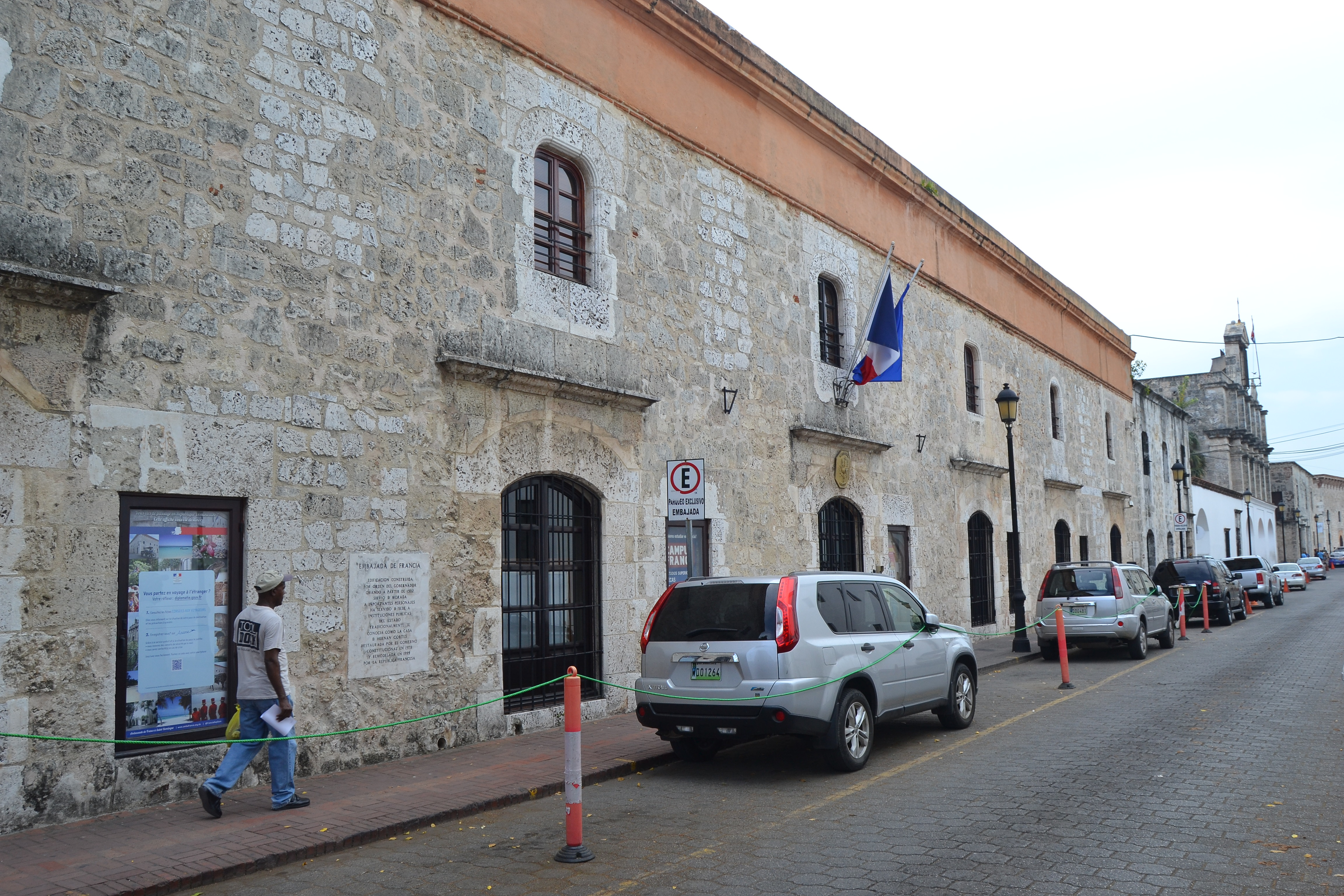
Casa de Hernán Cortés

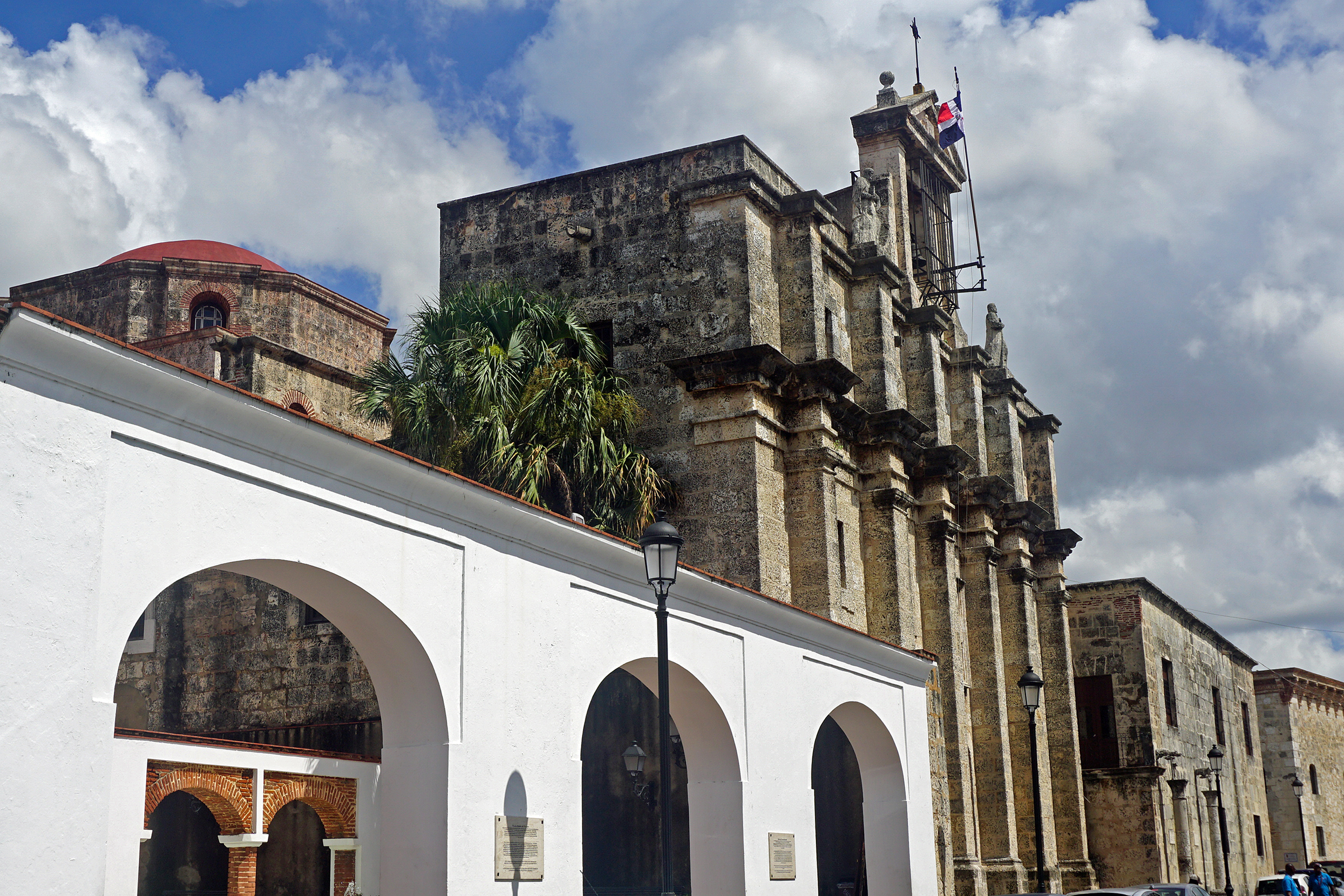
National Pantheon

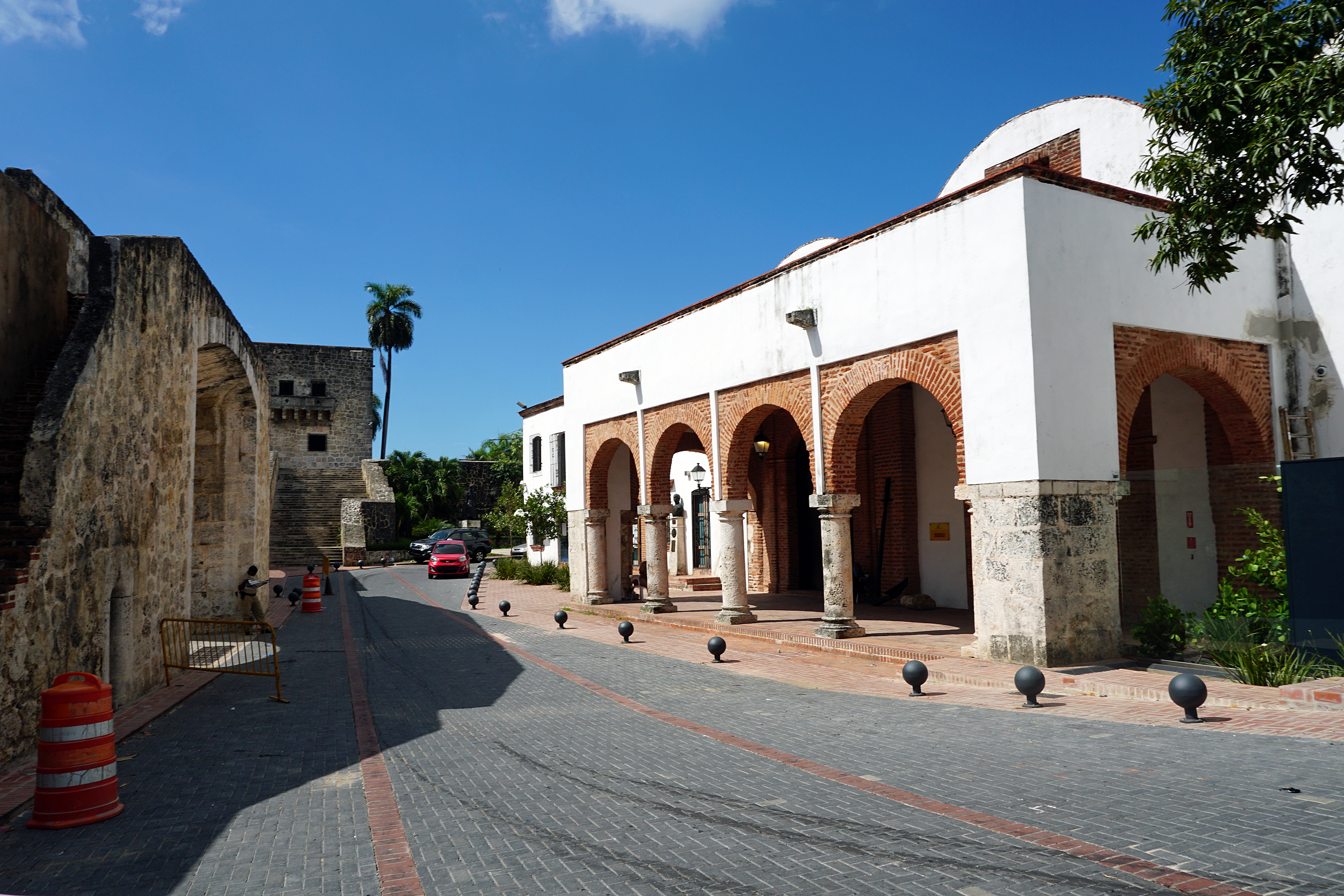
Museo Naval Atarazanas Reales

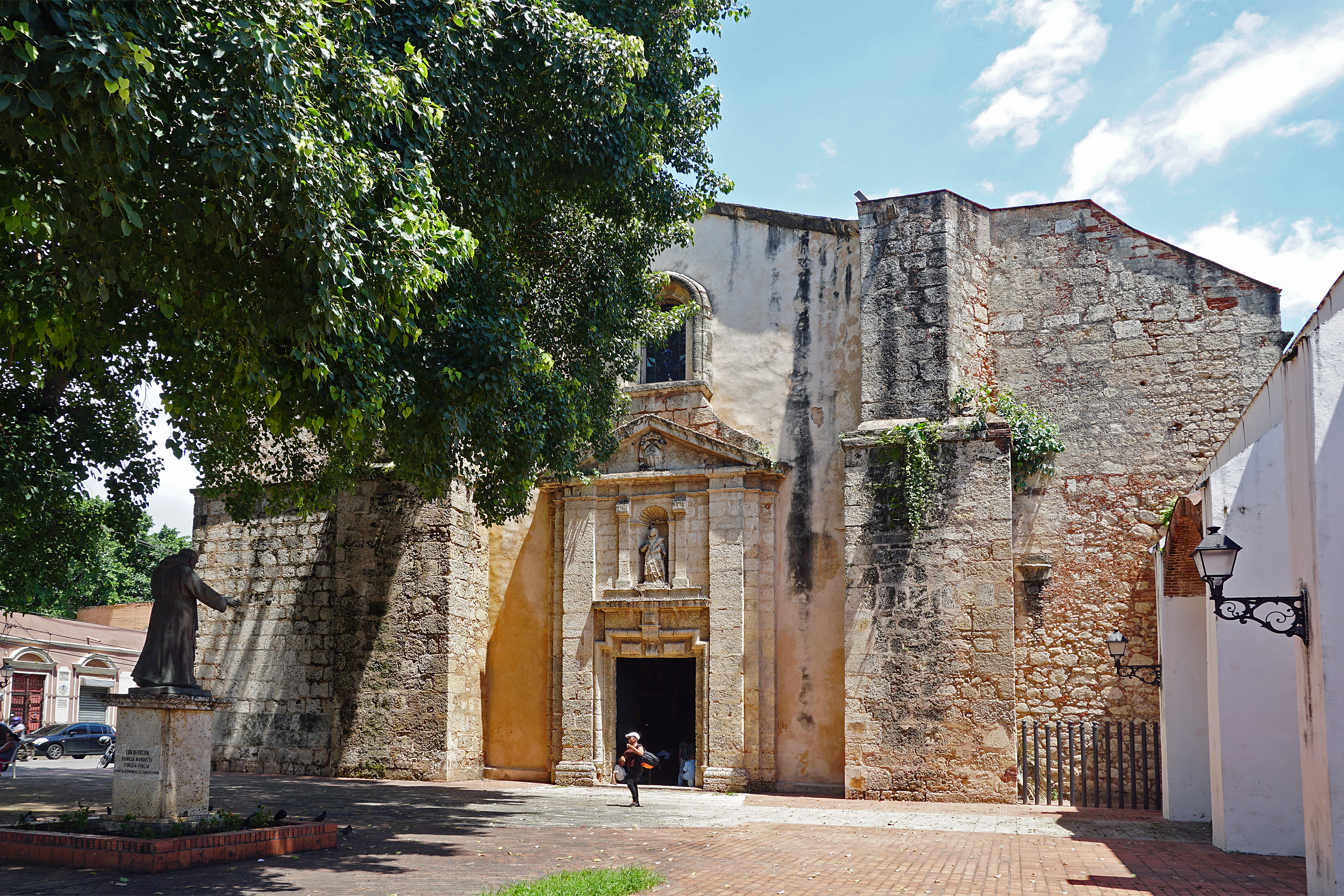
Iglesia Las Mercedes

== See also ==
- Colony of Santo Domingo
- Timeline of Santo Domingo
- Port of Santo Domingo
- Old San Juan, Puerto Rico
- Old Havana, Cuba

== Works cited ==
- Moreta Castillo, Américo "El Santo Domingo del Siglo XVIII a través del Libro Becerro". "CLIO" 74 (Santo Domingo, 2007) pp.&nbsp; 43–66.
- González Hernández, Julio Amable "Toponomía y Genealogía: La Ciudad Colonial (2 de 15)". "IDG" (Santo Domingo, 2007)
- Alemar, Luis "La Ciudad de Santo Domingo: Santo Domingo, Ciudad Trujillo". "Editora de Santo Domingo" (Santo Domingo, 1980)
