= Castilian Civil War of 1437–1445 =

Civil War for the Crown of Castile

- Part of Castilian Civil War
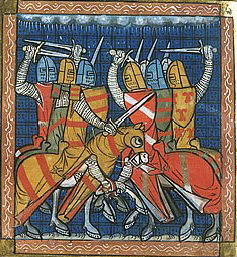
- Miniature depicting medieval cavalry in combat.
Date	1437–1445
Location	Crown of Castile
Result	Victory of the side of John II of Castile and his valido Álvaro de Luna

Belligerents
Crown of Castile	Part of the Castilian nobility: Supported by: • Kingdom of Navarre • Crown of Aragon

Commanders and leaders
John II of Castile; Álvaro de Luna; Prince Henry IV of Castile; Gutierre de Sotomayor; Pedro Fernández de Velasco; Gutierre Álvarez de Toledo; Lope de Barrientos; Fernando Álvarez de Toledo y Sarmiento; Íñigo López de Mendoza, 1st Marquis of Santillana; Pedro de Zúñiga; Garci IV Fernández Manrique de Lara; Juan Pacheco; Juan Alonso Pérez de Guzmán; Gastón de la Cerda y Sarmiento; Juan de Luna y Pimentel; Lorenzo II Suárez de Figueroa; Juan Ramírez de Arellano; Carlos de Arellano; Pedro Fernández de Córdoba y Arellano Pedro Álvarez Osorio	John II of Aragon; Henry of Aragon; Alfonso V of Aragon; Maria of Aragon (1440-1444); Pedro Manrique de Lara y Mendoza; Fadrique Enríquez; Rodrigo Alonso Pimentel; Pedro de Zúñiga; Pedro de Acuña y Portugal; Alfonso de Aragón y Escobar; Pedro de Quiñones; Luis de la Cerda y Mendoza; Pedro López de Ayala el Tuerto; Diego Gómez de Sandoval y Rojas Pedro Ruiz Sarmiento

The Castilian Civil War of 1437–1445 was a civil war in which two noble factions fought for power in the Crown of Castile. On one side was Constable Álvaro de Luna, King John II of Castile, and Henry Prince of Asturias. On the other side was the noble League led by Infantes of Aragon John and Henry, sons of Ferdinand of Antequera, who was the regent of Castile during the minority of John II. Although the Infantes of Aragon faction won in 1441, imposing their conditions in the Medina del Campo ruling, the final victory went to the royalist faction and the Constable, who won the decisive battle of Olmedo. According to historian Carme Batlle, Álvaro de Luna is primarily responsible for the war. Following his victory over the Infantes of Aragon during the truces of Majano, Luna's "authoritarian excesses" escalated and led to a civil war. Although Batlle places the war's start in 1439.

== Arrest of Pedro Manrique and Castronuño agreement (1437-1439) ==
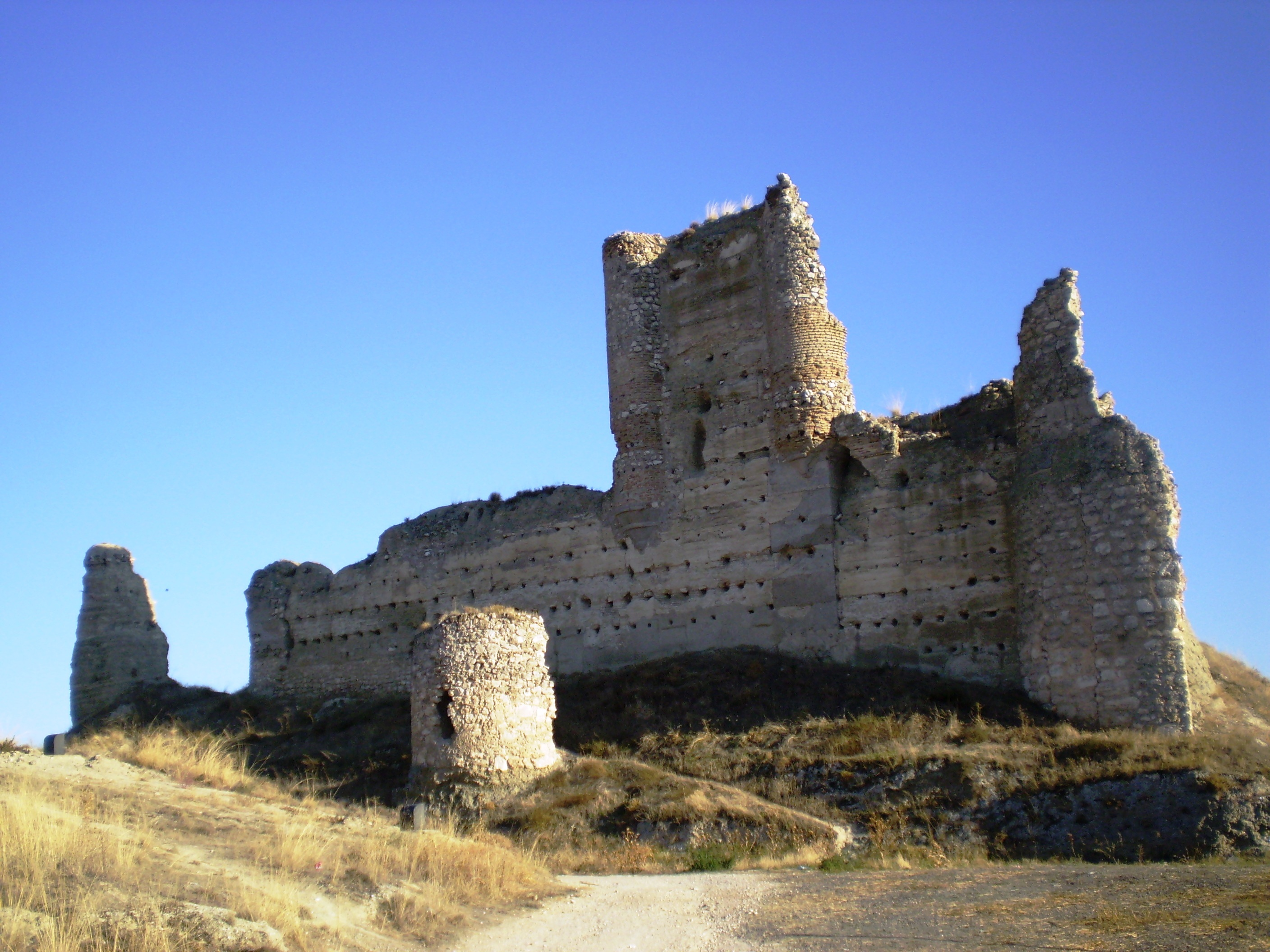
Fuentidueña de Tajo Castle from where Pedro Manrique escaped in August 1438

After the defeat of the Infantes of Aragon in the Castilian–Aragonese War of 1429–1430, the position of the Constable Álvaro de Luna at the Castilian court was consolidated, but after a few years a faction of the nobility began to oppose the almost absolute power that he had achieved thanks to King John II's trust in him. One of the leaders of the group was Pedro Manrique, the Adelantado Mayor of León. On August 13, 1437, he was apprehended in Medina del Campo on the king's orders, at Álvaro's request. This event sparked a period of aristocratic discord in Castile that Jaume Vicens Vives stated escalated into a civil war. Following the arrest of Pedro Manrique, his supporters and relatives rose in rebellion alongside nobles who opposed Álvaro de Luna. These nobles were led by Fadrique Enríquez, the Admiral of Castile, as well as the Counts of Benavente, of Ledesma, and of Valencia de John, namely Rodrigo Alonso Pimentel, Pedro de Estúñiga, and Pedro de Acuña y Portugal, respectively.

In August 1438, Pedro Manrique escaped from confinement in Fuentidueña de Tajo Castle. In February 1439, he and Castilian Admiral Fadrique Enriquez signed a letter to King John II demanding the banishment of Constable Alvaro de Luna's court "with all his relatives and people, so that Your Grace may remain in all of your free power." In the next month, the rebellious aristocrats surprised Valladolid, prompting King John II to seek assistance from the Infantes of Aragon, including John, the Navarrese king consort. He obtained royal permission to cross the border in accordance with the stipulations of the Concord of Toledo of 1436. On April 6, 1439, he convened with the king in Cuéllar, where he met with the court and the primary unit of the Constable's army. He was joined by his brother, Archbishop of Toledo Juan de Cerezuela, and a group of nobles who supported him, including the Master of the Order of Alcántara Gutierre de Sotomayor, the Count of Haro Pedro Fernández de Velasco, and the Bishop of Palencia, Gutierre Álvarez de Toledo. John was accompanied by his brother, Infante Henry. However, Henry soon joined the side of the revolted nobles when they promised him the return of all his possessions confiscated at the end of the Castilian-Aragonese War of 1429-1430, as well as the mastery of the Order of Santiago, which he had previously held.

In June 1439, John, King of Navarre, convened leaders from two opposing factions in Tordesillas. The purpose was to negotiate an agreement without resorting to armed conflict. On one side were King John II himself, the Constable Álvaro and the Count of Castro; on the other, the Admiral of Castile, the Adelantado Mayor of León, the Count of Benavente and the Comendador Mayor of Castile. No agreement was reached, as the nobles supporting Álvaro de Luna refused to return the goods they had confiscated from the Infantes of Aragon in 1430. A skirmish occurred a few days after the unsuccessful Tordesillas meeting in Roa, where the armies of the Count of Ribadeo, belonging to Álvaro de Luna's faction, clashed with the rebel nobility who had formed a League. However, the discussions did not come to an end, and a temporary resolution was reached in October 1439, referred to as the Castronuño agreement, that inflicted a six-month banishment from the court on Álvaro de Luna.

== Medina del Campo ruling (1439-1441) ==
Álvaro de Luna violated the Castronuño agreement by maintaining communication with the king through the nobles of his faction, who were present at court. This prompted intervention from both John of Navarre and the nobles of the League, who demanded that King John II "swear not to deliver or take any action without their advice." On January 17, 1440, the day after receiving the message, the king chose to flee the court located in Madrigal with the prince of Asturias and the noble supporters of Alvaro. In the face of this attitude by King John II, the King of Navarre abandoned the position of mediator he held until then and sided with the nobiliary League. So did his sister, Queen Maria, wife of the Castilian king, and the Count of Haro Pedro Fernandez de Velasco, guarantor of the "Seguro de Tordesillas" which had facilitated the gathering of the ringleaders in the aforementioned town.

John of Navarre led his armies towards Bonilla de la Sierra, where King John II had sought refuge after escaping from Madrigal. John's forces captured Ávila, prompting John II to enter negotiations and appoint an embassy to meet with John and the other leaders of the nobiliary League in Madrigal. There, the king's ambassadors received a memorial addressed to John II in which the government of Alvaro de Luna was harshly criticized and who was even accused of being a homosexual, "which was always more reviled in Spain than any other known to man", and of having bewitched King John II: "the said Constable has bound and tied up all your bodily and animal powers by magical and deavollic enchantments". Finally, it was demanded that the king should order "the restitution of his royal liberty and power and his wealth". (Note: The document made a detailed account of the faults attributed to Don Alvaro; forgetfulness of his birth and ambition to bid on "all the great and noble of your kingdoms"; hoarding and control of the public treasury and the mints; immoderate increase of the taxes; direction of the royal treasury towards its own peculium and situation of funds abroad, specifically in Venice; protection of illicit games; intervention in the ecclesiastical elections; purchase of ecclesiastical goods to the detriment of the treasury; management of the royal grants and appointments; usurpation of municipal functions; coercion of members of the royal council; seizure of tenures and captaincies of castles; general impersonation of the monarch. After this list of accusations, in which acts typical of an authoritarian monarchy were intermingled with the ailments of all privation, the memorial went on to consider the abuses of power of the Constable with respect to his enemies: fomenting tares among the great men of Castile; persecution of the princes of Aragon; deaths of the Count of Trastámara, the Count of Luna and Fernán Alonso de Robles; premeditated imprisonment of Pedro Manrique. Vicens Vives (2003, pp. 102–103)) At the same time, support for the king and the Constable was declining as cities began to switch sides and align with the League, demonstrated by the Cortes held in Valladolid in May 1440.

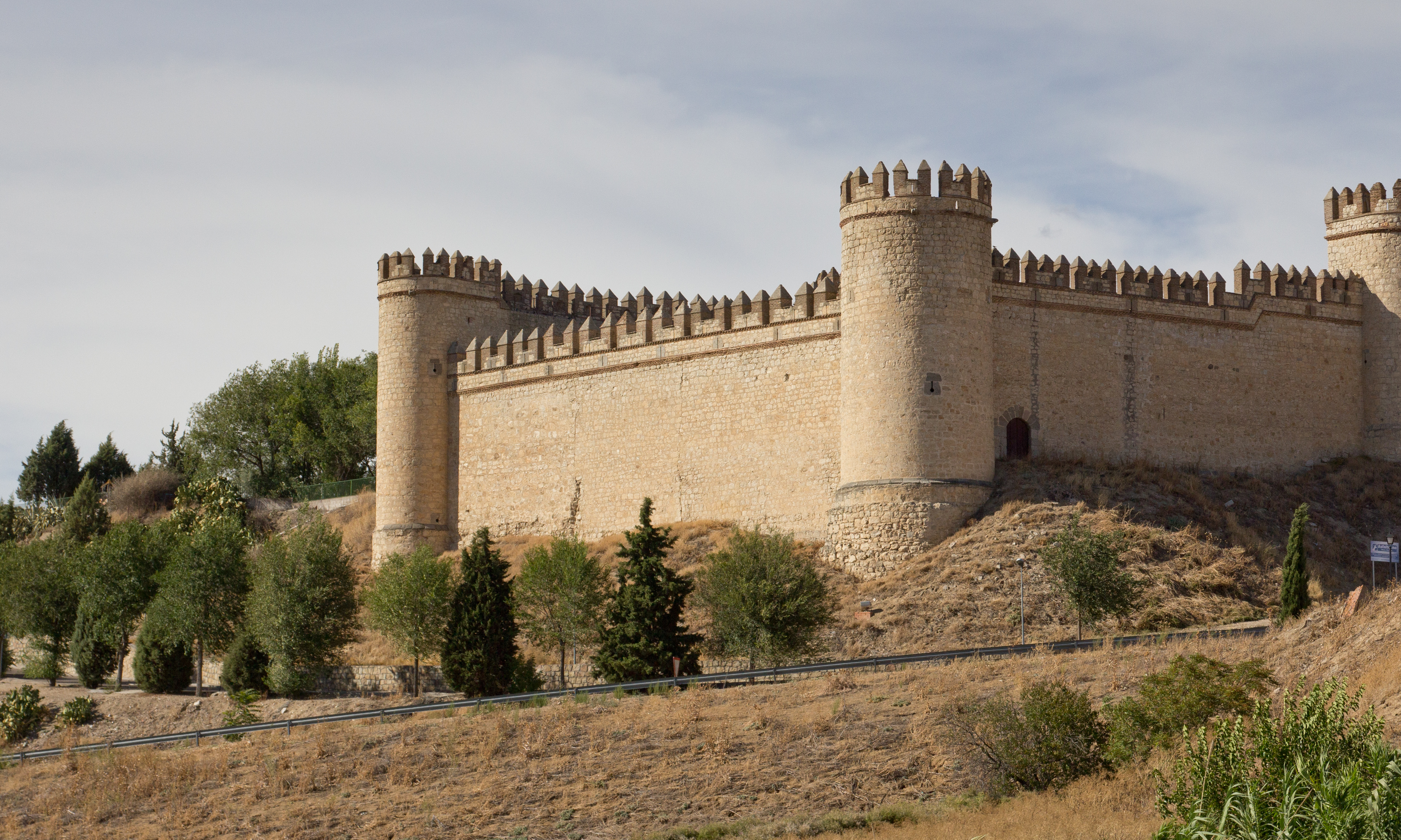
Castillo de Maqueda, one of the strongholds of Álvaro de Luna, which he had to surrender to his adversaries in compliance with the Medina del Campo ruling.

Finally King John II agreed to meet with the Infantes of Aragon and the leaders of the League in Valladolid, accepting the banishment from the court of the most prominent supporters of Álvaro de Luna: the Archbishop of Seville Gutierre Álvarez de Toledo, the Bishop of Segovia Lope de Barrientos and the Count of Alba Fernando Álvarez de Toledo y Sarmiento. To cement the pact, on September 15, 1440, the wedding of the Prince of Asturias, Henry, and Doña Blanca, daughter of the King of Navarre, was celebrated in Valladolid, as stipulated in the Concord of Toledo.

But in early January 1441, King John II fled from the court in Arévalo with the Prince of Asturias to gain independence from the Infantes of Aragon and the League. They traveled to Avila, where the Archbishop of Seville and the Bishop of Segovia, along with other prominent supporters of Alvaro de Luna, awaited them. There they decided to reach out to the Constable for a consultation on the kingdom's affairs and disputes. The interview occurred on January 6 in El Tiemblo. The next day, they issued an ultimatum to the League, warning them of war if they did not dismantle their forces. The League demanded that the Constable "leave the kingdom" as a prerequisite for any agreement, and on January 21 they published a manifesto in Arévalo against Álvaro de Luna, calling on the Castilian cities to join the League in the war they would wage against the Constable. The document began as follows:

"You well know how much damage and harm these kingdoms have suffered from twenty years to the present the favouritism of the Constable with the said lord king."

Then they reiterated the arguments already presented to the ambassadors of John II in Madrigal, with the addition of a new one: that Alvaro de Luna intended to tyrannize the Prince of Asturias and Queen Maria. It ended by saying that the signatories, the Infantes of Aragon and the noble leaders of the League:

"[have] agreed to reverse and we revert to the said Constable any security and assurances... and we revoke and annul them... and we send him to challenge by our procurators as an enemy of the said lord king... and as a sower of scandals and tumults and discords."

The League's troops initiated the first battles with the opposing factions in the Tagus valley. After leaving Arevalo, they traversed the Guadarrama mountain range and attacked Maqueda and Illescas, which were under the control of the Constable and his brother, the Archbishop of Toledo. Íñigo López de Mendoza captured Illescas and Prince Henry took control of Alcalá de Henares. However, the League's troops were unsuccessful in their attempts to capture Maqueda, a stronghold belonging to Álvaro de Luna, as well as the Royal Alcázar of Madrid, where Álvaro's son Juan de Luna y Pimentel was fortified. Meanwhile, other League forces seized territories of the Constable to the north of Sierra de Guadarrama, including Riaza, Sepúlveda and Ayllón.

The Constable launched a counterattack in Tagus Valley, successfully defeating the League's forces in the battle of Torote that occurred on April 7, 1441 near the Torote River and Alcalá de Henares, as well as near Arroyo de Molina by Montánchez. In late April, he besieged Torrijos, where Infante Henry was staying, asking for the help of most of the troops of the league that were concentrated in Arévalo under the command of his brother, John of Navarre. The royal army left Avila to assist Henry in Torrijos after John's forces departed, in accordance with a plan agreed upon by John II and the Constable. On May 15, the army captured Medina del Campo, Castle of La Mota, and Olmedo, all owned by John. The king's endorsement of Constable Alvaro de Luna compelled the League to view John II as their adversary, directing their forces against him. Consequently, the majority of League forces that had laid siege to Maqueda lifted the siege and returned across the Guadarrama mountain range to Medina del Campo, where John II's army was situated.

The Constable Alvaro de Luna reinforced Medina del Campo's defense on June 8 with 1,600 men-at-arms. However, on June 28, the League's forces broke through the walls and entered the town by surprise. According to a contemporary chronicler, the 3,000 royal soldiers refused to fight "due to their displeasure with their Constable", enabling the seizure of the location. He and his brother, the Archbishop of Toledo, along with the Master of the Order of Alcántara, were able to flee, but King John II was captured by the League. However, a contemporary chronicler reported that "the king was always guarded and respected with the utmost humility and reverence". From that moment forward, as noted by Jaume Vicens Vives, "John of Navarre became the mediator of Castilian political affairs."

A few days after the attack on Medina del Campo, the Medina del Campo ruling was signed in which the victors imposed their conditions on the vanquished. As stipulated in the verdict, Constable Álvaro de Luna was banished from the court for six years.

== Battle of Olmedo (1441-1445) ==
On July 9, 1443, the coup of Rágama was carried out by the Admiral of Castile and the Count of Benavente, who, at the instigation of John, Infante of Aragon and King Consort of Navarre, kidnapped King John II of Castile in the town of Rágama, where he was waiting for his quarters to be set up in the nearby town of Madrigal. The purpose was to prevent Constable Alvaro de Luna from striking a blow against John of Navarre and regaining control of the Castilian monarchy.

The following morning, the court was moved from Rágama to Madrigal, and during the journey the Bishop of Avila, Lope de Barrientos, a supporter of the Constable, convinced the Prince of Asturias that it was not true what he had been told by the supporters of John of Navarre about an alleged conspiracy of Álvaro de Luna to arrest him and his advisor, Juan Pacheco. Thus they sealed an alliance to oppose John of Navarre and his allies in the nobiliary League.

Months later, after gathering support among the high Castilian nobility, the Prince of Asturias, Henry, declared war on John of Navarre by means of a manifesto published on March 29, 1444, in which he made a special appeal to the Castilian regions bordering Navarre so that all would join the fight to free King John II, expel the "foreigners" and attack the towns of the neighboring kingdom. The document ended with an offer of pardon to the members of the nobility League who joined their ranks, assuring them that Constable Álvaro de Luna:

"is mine and in my house and lives with me, and he must do the things that I command and say to him after the king my lord and that would be his service and mine."

After the war declaration, the Asturian prince mobilized his armies, including those of the Constable and the nobles supporting him (the Archbishop of Toledo, the Count of Alba, the Count of Haro, the Count of Plasencia, the Count of Castañeda, and Íñigo López de Mendoza). They headed to Burgos where they arrived in early June, while the armies of John of Navarre were entrenched in Pampliega, just six leagues away from Burgos, after moving the king to Portillo Castle. Remaining under Count of Castro's custody, the subject withdrew to Palencia upon being informed of King John II's escape from Portillo Castle on June 16. This was due to the assistance rendered by Queen Mary, who had defected. Shortly thereafter, in Mojados, the queen pledged her support to the king with a promise to stand by him "against all the people of the world, even if they were of royal state and were close to him in any degree". She also aimed to ensured his "complete personal freedom to rule and govern his kingdoms freely". Finally, John retreated to the Navarre border, but did not cross it, and waited for his brother King Alfonso the Magnanimous of Aragon to intervene, as the Prince of Asturias' declaration of war violated the Concord of Toledo of 1436.

After John's retreat, King John II seized his Castilian possessions, including Medina del Campo, Olmedo, Roa, and Peñafiel. The latter was captured on August 16 following a month-long siege. Ten days later, the ambassadors of Alfonso the Magnanimous arrived at the Castilian court in the village of Torresandino. However, they were unable to persuade John II to comply with the stipulations of the Concord of Toledo and return the occupied places. The King of Castile demanded that the King of Navarre vacate "his kingdoms" and dispatched a force of 1,500 soldiers to the border of Navarre. Meanwhile, another army, led by the Prince of Asturias and Constable Álvaro de Luna, crossed the Guadarrama mountain range to occupy the territories of the Order of Santiago, led by the Infante Henry, and of the Order of Calatrava, governed by the illegitimate son of King Alfonso of Navarre Alfonso.

On September 25, 1444, a five-month ceasefire was established between the opposing factions. However, during this period, King John II utilized the opportunity to seize all of the Castilian assets belonging to the Infantes of Aragon. Therefore, despite the embassy of King Alfonso the Magnanimous of Aragon threatening the Castilian king with "great distress and sorrow" if he did not take steps towards reconciliation with his cousins, the Infante Henry and John, no progress was made. Following the failed Aragonese embassy, preparations for war were made. The Court of Navarre, meeting in Olite, approved a large donation of money between December 1444 and February 1445 to defend the kingdom of Navarre against possible Castilian attack. Additionally, King Alfonso the Magnanimous of Aragon was sought for intervention. Meanwhile, Henry, the Infante of Aragon, retreated with his army to Lorca, where he gathered troops recruited from the southern Kingdom of Valencia.

When the ceasefire ended in February 1445, John of Navarre launched an invasion on the kingdom of Castile through the Henares basin. He captured Alcalá la Vieja, Alcalá de Henares, Torija, and Santorcaz from Atienza. The King of Castile responded by directing his army towards El Espinar where he received the news of his wife Queen Maria and her sister Queen Leonor of Portugal's death. Subsequently, he proceeded to La Alcarria, passing through Madrid and San Martin de Valdeiglesias to thwart the union of John's army with that of his brother, Henry, who was approaching from the south. However, he failed to achieve this objective. Meeting in Santorcaz, the two Infantes of Aragon decided to attack Alcalá de Henares, which had just been recaptured by John II, and, if the Castilian king did not put up a fight there, to advance to Olmedo, where they would join the armies of Castilian nobles who supported them, including the Admiral of Castile and the Count of Benavente. As Jaume Vicens Vives has pointed out, "it was a risky maneuver, which forced a definitive clash". On March 24, they arrived at Olmedo and held new negotiations between the King of Castile and the King of Navarre. However, the talks did not reach a satisfactory conclusion due to the fact that both Constable Álvaro de Luna on the royalist side, and Infante Henry on the rebel side, sought to resolve the conflict through armed means.

The royalist faction emerged victorious in the battle fought near Olmedo on May 19, 1445. Prince Henry and his brother, Prince John, sought refuge in Olmedo while their fellow nobles were taken as prisoners. The princes hurriedly fled to Aragon the next day, reaching Calatayud in a state of panic. There Prince Henry died on the 15th of July as a result of a wound he received in his hand and arm during the battle.

== Consequences ==
In an effort to prevent Constable Alvaro de Luna from regaining the significant power he held from 1430 to 1436, Prince of Asturias Henry garnered support from nobles aligned with the Infantes of Aragon. This support included the Admiral of Castile and the Counts of Benavente, Castro, and Plasencia. Henry achieved this support by convincing his father, the King, to grant these nobles a pardon and spare their possessions from confiscation. However, the Constable, his supporters, the Prince of Asturias himself, and his advisor Juan de Pacheco seized all the goods and titles of the Infantes of Aragon. As noted by historian Jaume Vicens Vives, the victory in Olmedo did not reinforce the Castilian monarchy but simply led to a redistribution of perks and estates, albeit with the "royal authority recovering much of its pre-eminence in the country." Álvaro de Luna became the new master of the Order of Santiago, and additionally received the county of Alburquerque and the lordship over the towns of Trujillo, Medellín and Cuéllar. Íñigo López de Mendoza was granted the marquisate of Santillana and the county of Real de Manzanares. Prince of Asturias, Henry, received the cities of Logroño, Ciudad Rodrigo and Jaén, as well as the city of Cáceres, while Juan Pacheco received the important Marquisate of Villena, as well as some places on the border with the Kingdom of Portugal, and his brother Pedro Girón received the Mastership of the Order of Calatrava. (Note: "This distribution not only satisfied the appetite of the victors, but also responded to the need to respect the molds of the internal Castilian political balance, as it had been conceived until then. The experience of 1437 had been of no use".Vicens Vives (2003, pp. 136–137))

César Álvarez Álvarez notes that the Battle of Olmedo had two significant outcomes. Firstly, the demise of Prince Henry, who was described as "the most ambitious, audacious, bellicose, and intriguing of the Infantes of Aragon". Secondly, it marked the conclusive departure of Prince John, the King of Navarre, from Castile. But this historian also agrees with Jaume Vicens Vives, emphasizing that the winners of Olmedo were the most prominent nobles of Castile who, on this occasion as well as others, reaped significant rewards. Alvarez Álvarez concludes:

"The removal of the Infantes [of Aragon] from their previous permanent intervention in Castilian lands and affairs opened a new path in the traditional confrontation between nobility and monarchy, aggravated by the existence of practically two courts, that of King John II and his valide, and that of the Prince of Asturias, the future Henry IV, with their respective parties and noble factions and interests. This situation would continue to seriously damage the prestige of the monarchical institution until the arrival of the Catholic Monarchs. Something that had certainly been happening for twenty years."

== See also ==
- History of Spain
- Castilian War

== Bibliography ==
- Álvarez Álvarez, César (2007). "Los infantes de Aragón". In Álvarez Palenzuela, Vicente Ángel (ed.). Historia de España de la Edad Media (in Spanish). Barcelona: Ariel. pp. 727–744. ISBN 978-84-344-6668-5.
- Batlle, Carmen (2007). "Triunfo nobiliario en Castilla y revolución en Cataluña". In Álvarez Palenzuela, Vicente Ángel (ed.). Historia de España de la Edad Media (in Spanish). Barcelona: Ariel. pp. 745–774. ISBN 978-84-344-6668-5.
- Vicens Vives, Jaume (2003). Freedman, Paul (ed.). Juan II de Aragón (1398-1479): monarquía y revolución en la España del siglo XV (in Spanish). Pamplona: Urgoiti editores. ISBN 84-932479-8-7.
