= Lope de Barrientos =

Castilian statesman (1382–1469)

- Bishop Barrientos
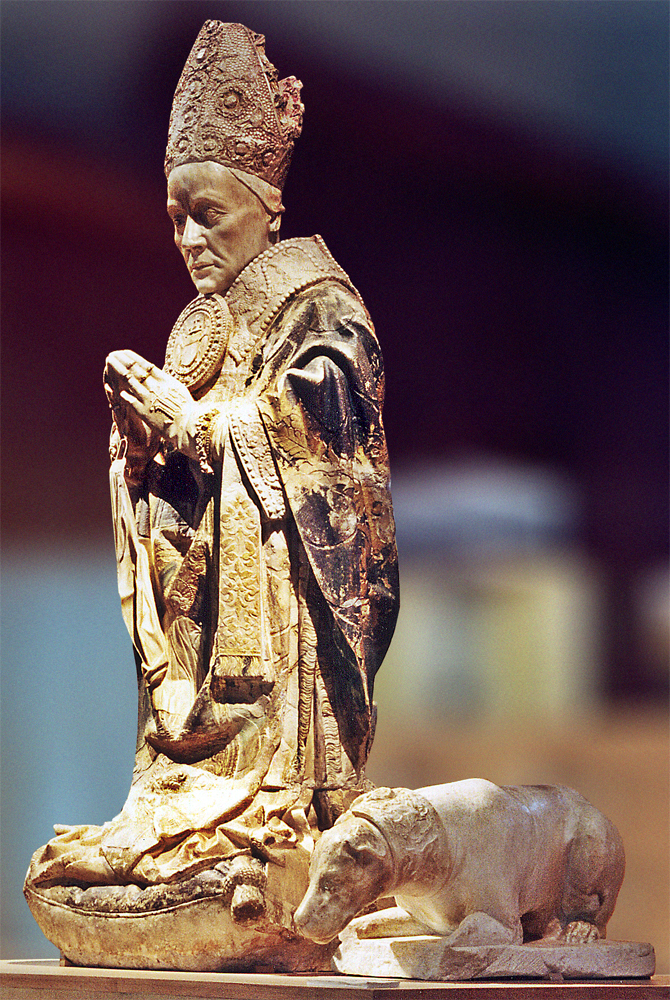
- Funeral portrait of Lope de Barrientos; from Museum of the Fairs in Medina del Campo

Personal details
- Born: 1382 Medina del Campo, León, Castile
- Died: 1469 (aged 86–87) Cuenca, Toledo, Castile
- Occupation: Clergyman and statesman

Lope de Barrientos (1382–1469), sometimes called Obispo Barrientos ("Bishop Barrientos"), was a powerful clergyman and statesman of the Crown of Castile during the 15th century, although his prominence and the influence he wielded during his lifetime is not a subject of common study in Spanish history.

From relatively humble beginnings in Medina del Campo, where he studied grammar, he took advantage of a secular custom of Castilian monarchs to selectively promote lower class court nobility to the service of Ferdinand I of Aragon—a privilege normally reserved for those of high birth.

Barrientos exploited every opening to climb in social rank against the backdrop of a complex political atmosphere: he became a Dominican friar; served as a professor of theology at the University of Salamanca (possibly the first); as the bishop of three successive cities—Segovia, Ávila, and chiefly of Cuenca —as royal confessor of John II of Castile; an Inquisitor; an advisor to Henry IV of Castile; and as Chancellor of Castile. In addition, he published a series of theological treatises and tracts concerning religious problems encountered in 15th-century Spain.

== Biography ==
Barrientos was born in Medina del Campo in 1382, the son of Pedro Gutierre de Barrientos, a servant of Ferdinand I of Aragon, who was killed during a battle in service to the king. It is probable, though not possible to conclusively demonstrate, that his family were originally Marranos—that is, Sephardic Jews who in earlier times adopted the identity of Christians, either by sincere conversion or through coercion, or who, for form's sake, became Catholic converts in service to the Crown. He was born into the court and was treated as one of the Infantes de Aragón ("Princes of Aragon"; the children of Fernando I and Eleanor of Alburquerque), which explains why he was a part of—-at least at first—the internal Castilian struggles against Álvaro de Luna, the Constable of Castile, Grand Master of the military order of Santiago, and favorite of King John II.

Barrientos first studied to be a Dominican friar in Medina, then at the Convent of San Esteban in Salamanca in 1406. Following the completion of his education, he took a teaching position at the University of Salamanca, where he conducted classes in theology and philosophy. While at the university, he met and befriended another eminent figure, Juan de Torquemada. Barrientos and Torquemada had many things in common: they were both likely of Jewish origin; belonged to the Dominican Order; came from villages in the province of Valladolid; and, undoubtedly, shared ideas on the religious problem of Castile.

Barrientos was considered so outstanding in his teaching that in 1416 he was offered and accepted a chair at the university as professor of theology. Adding more prestige to the position, it is thought that this was the first time the University of Salamanca had endorsed this type of professorship. He remained there until 1433, when King John II nominated him to the post of royal confessor and further entrusted him with the education of his sons, Prince Henry (who went on to become "the Impotent" King) and later, Prince Alfonso (b. 1453 – d. 1468).

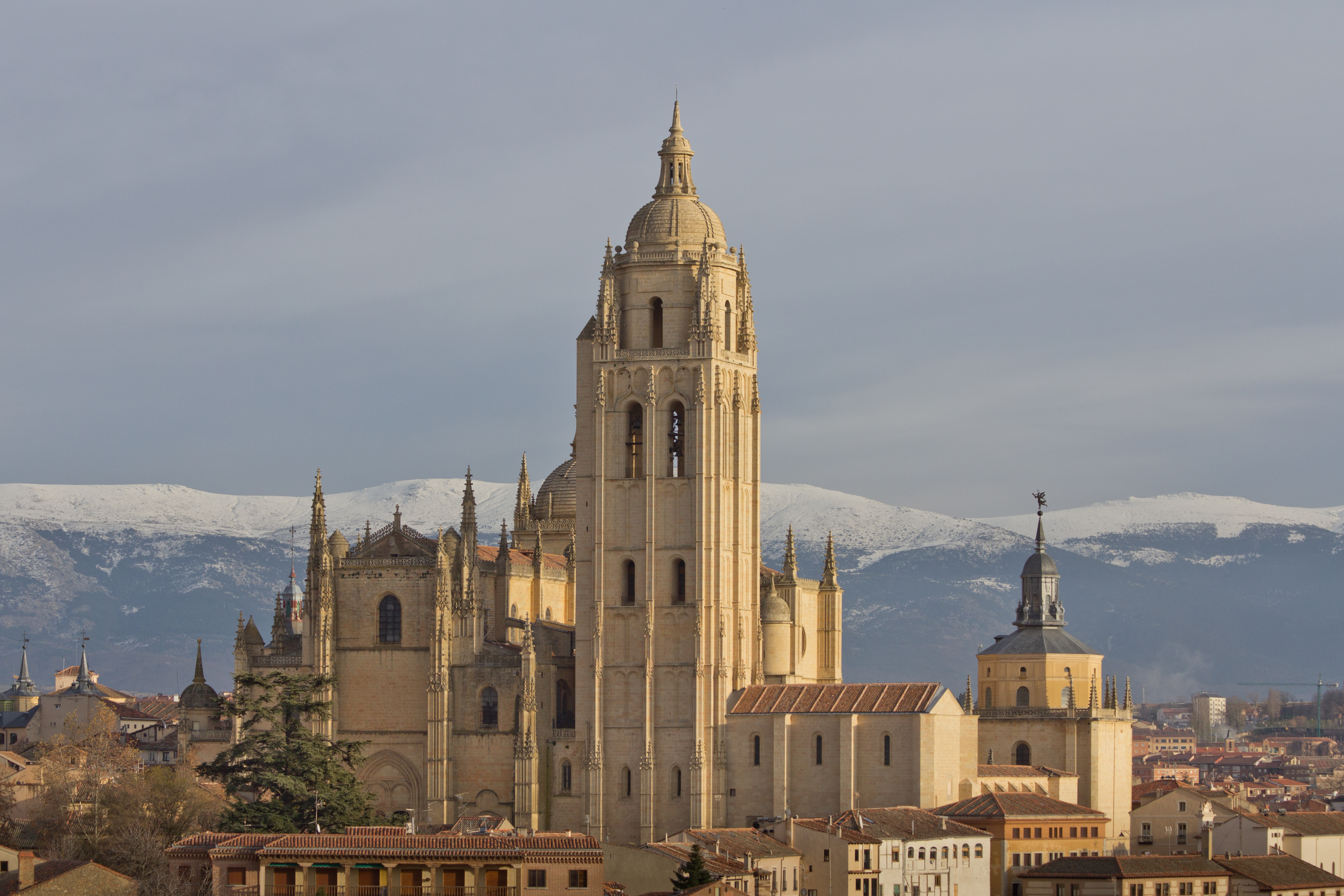
View of the Cathedral of Segovia from the Alcázar.

Barrientos was appointed an Inquisitor during this time, and in 1438 was elected Bishop of Segovia. On 3 May 1440 a church council was convened in the Church of San Miguel of Turégano, at which he presented his synodal commandments for the theological and pastoral formation of his clergymen. Being loyal to John II, in 1442 he reformed the diocese of Segovia, which had been under the influence of the rebellious prince Henry, to serve the province of Ávila in supporting the King. Later, he engineered a conciliation in the Tordesillas area to create a joint front in the face of the opposition of the Kingdoms of Navarre and Aragon. In 1444 he occupied the diocese of Cuenca and in the following year he lent the diocese's aid to the region's troops in the First Battle of Olmedo. Similarly, in 1449, he pledged the arms of the diocese in defense against the troops of don Alonso de Aragón and other Castilian noblemen who opposed the king. One offered him the archbishopric seat of Santiago de Compostela, but he rejected this enticement.

Despite his important religious responsibilities, Bishop Barrientos never neglected his duty to the state, serving throughout his career as adviser first to John II, later to Henry IV, and possibly as an instructor of Henry IV's half-sister and successor, Isabella I of Castile as well as being named tutor to John II's youngest son, Prince Alphonsus in the King's will. From his privileged position of confidence it is likely that he decisively influenced their politics, as the religious policy views of all three monarchs closely resembled Barrientos' known theological policy leanings. Nevertheless, Barrientos deplored both kings for their sheepishness, and it is likely he conspired against Henry IV before his coronation, given his close relationship with the Princes of Aragón.

His work as man of state was as discreet as it was fundamental. He worked (or plotted) in close proximity to John II, at first as a partisan supporter of the Princes of Aragón, but later as a faithful follower of John II, once he became king. Ultimately, he became a very powerful and rich man despite the vow of poverty associated with the Dominican Order.

Although Álvaro de Luna had been a favorite of John II, acting as one of his main advisors, and wielded great power as Grand Master of the military order of Santiago, the king's second wife, Isabella of Portugal, was offended at the immense influence of the constable, and urged her husband to free himself from slavery to his favorite. In 1453 the king succumbed; Álvaro was arrested, tried and condemned. He was executed at Valladolid on 2 June 1453. Barrientos stepped into the power vacuum, replacing Luna in the government of Castile until the death of John II just a year later. Following the crowning of Henry IV, Barrientos separated to some extent from the affairs of the state over disagreements with the new monarch. Despite his eventful political life, he still had time to found diverse convent houses—the Hospital de San Sebastián de Cuenca and Nuestra Señora de la Piedad de Medina del Campo—and to write numerous books, reflecting his adherence to the philosophy of scholasticism. Barrientos died in Cuenca on 30 May 1469 and was laid to rest in the second of the two convents he founded.

== Activities as inquisitor and policy on conversion ==
At the end of the 15th century, a wide sector of Spanish society was hostile toward Jews; as the Franciscan, Alphonso de Spina explains in his treatise, Fortalitium Fidei: "Entraron, ¡oh Señor!, en tu rebaño los lobos rapaces. Nadie piensa en los pérfidos judíos, que blasfeman de tu nombre" (They entered your flock, oh Lord!, as greedy wolves. Nobody thinks about the perfidious Jews, who blaspheme in your name).

By contrast, there were influential Spaniards who decried these attitudes—at least toward converted Jews (some of them being converts themselves) such as Díaz de Toledo, Alonso de Cartagena, Lope Barrientos, and Juan de Torquemada (the uncle of the inquisitor). Benzion Netanyahu, a noted writer on 15th-century Spanish affairs, affirms that when the converted Spaniards were persecuted, they were "determined to fight fire with fire, the Marranos enlisted in their support men of courage and brilliance, such as Lope de Barrientos".

Barrientos wrote a number of tracts defending Jews; in one he recognized that it is "posible es que aya algunos, pero puesto que ansy sea, injusta e inhumana cosa sería todo el linaje dellos manzellar nin diffamar" (possible that there are some deserving of condemnation, but even if that is the case, it would be unjust and cruel to debase and defame all people of Jewish heritage). Thanks to his position as inquisitor and the influence that title conferred upon him, he was able to contact Pope Nicholas V regarding the issue. In 1449 he obtained a favorable response; according to Barrientos, the Pontiff "había mandado que no se hiciera ninguna discriminación entre los nuevos convertidos a la fe y los cristianos viejos en la recepción y tenencia de honores, dignidades y oficios, tanto eclesiásticos como seculares" (ordered him not to discriminate between new converts to the faith and old Christians in the reception and tenancy of honors, dignities and offices, both ecclesiastical and secular).

Barrientos went so far as to make sure that he was descended from converted Jews. However, the research's aim was to establish himself as an old Christian, with the goal of using this evidence to strengthen his ideological position: to defend converted Jews, but to attack unconverted Jews.

Despite his defense of converted Jews, Barrientos and, the Dominican Order in general, supported the prohibition of Judaism in Castile. His stance was that the Judeo-Spaniards had to convert or leave. They defended this ideology until Tomás de Torquemada, the grand inquisitor, convinced Isabella I of Castile and Ferdinand II of Aragon to act. In 1492 the Alhambra Decree issued, which mandated the expulsion of all Jews from Spain and its territories and possessions by 31 July 1492.

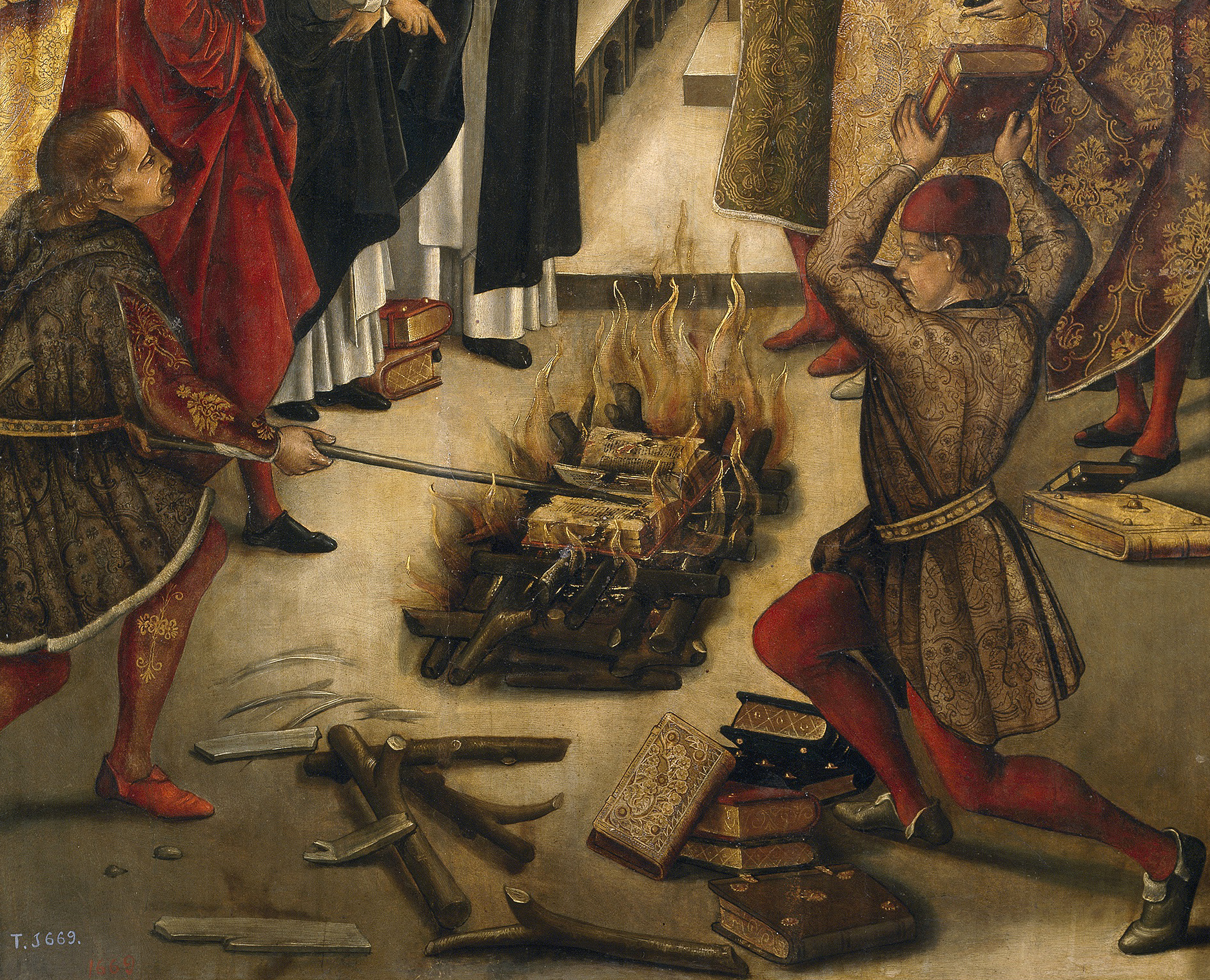
Detail from a painting by Pedro Berruguete on the life of Santo Domingo de Guzmán depicting Dominican friars burning heretical books

Another campaign Barrientos took up with the king was the prosecution of Enrique de Villena, whom he charge with witchcraft and necromancy. Villena was a man of letters who wrote on diverse topics, was a translator (most notably of Virgil's Aeneid), a surgeon, and it is possible that he collected books in Hebrew and Arabic; such pursuits automatically turned him into a suspected heretic. Although John II was himself a man of innovative ideas and one of the more cultured people of his age, like many of the era, he distrusted intellectuals, and, in response to Barrientos' suit, condemned Enrique de Villena to prison. These events are well attested in unpublished works authored by Barrientos, which still exist in Salamanca, such as his Tratado de caso e fortuna (Treatise on Prophesies).

After Villena died in jail in 1434, King John II submitted his library to Barrientos for investigation. Barrientos ordered the majority of the manuscripts burned, but preserved a few.

The poet, Juan de Mena (1411–1456), a chronicler of King John II's life, skewered Barrientos for these deeds in his Laberinto de fortuna ("Labyrinth of Fortune"), a 300-octave poem which explicitly mirrors the form of Dante Alighieri's Divine Comedy:

Perdió los tus libros sin ser conosçidos,	(He lost your books without knowing what's what,
e cómo en esequia te fueron ya luego	and since in funeral you had already came
unos metidos al ávido fuego,	put into the thirsty flame,
otros sin orden non bien repartidos;	and others were without order badly divided;)

Some accused Barrientos of being a savage and of plundering the most valuable books in Villena's collection in order to plagiarize them. Others, however, justified his acts by rationalizing that since John II wanted the entire collection put to the torch, it was only through Barrientos' intervention that even some were saved. Barrientos himself offered an explanation of the events, addressed to the king, in his Tractado de la Divinança, translated from the original Spanish as follows:

Your Majesty, after the death of Don Enrique de Villena, as a Christian king, you sent me, your devoted follower, to burn his books, which I executed in the presence of your servants. These action, and other ones, are a testament to your Majesty's devotion to Christianity. While this is praiseworthy, on the other hand, it is useful to entrust some books to reliable people who would use them solely with the goal of educating themselves to better defend the Christian religion and faith and to bedevil idolaters and practitioners of necromancy.

== Barrientos and Álvaro de Luna ==
It is difficult to determine whether Bishop Barrientos was a supporter of Constable Álvaro de Luna or not, as, in the words of the historian, José Luis Martín: "... entre 1435 y 1440 el sistema de alianzas cambia continuamente. No es posible en una obra de esta naturaleza referirnos a todas ellas ni mencionar los nombres de quienes apoyan a unos u otro en cada momento" (... between 1435 and 1440 the system of alliances changed continuously. It is not possible in a work of this nature to refer to all of them nor to even mention the names of those who supported one faction or another at any given moment). Or as put by historian Paulino Iradiel: "Las luchas civiles se desarrollan de manera contradictoria e intermitente hasta el final del reinado (de Juan II), con alianzas, tácticas circunstanciales y cambios de bando que hacen difícil su explicación" (until the end of the reign of John II, the civil struggles developed in a contradictory and intermittent way, with alliances, circumstantial tactics and changes of edict that confound explanation).

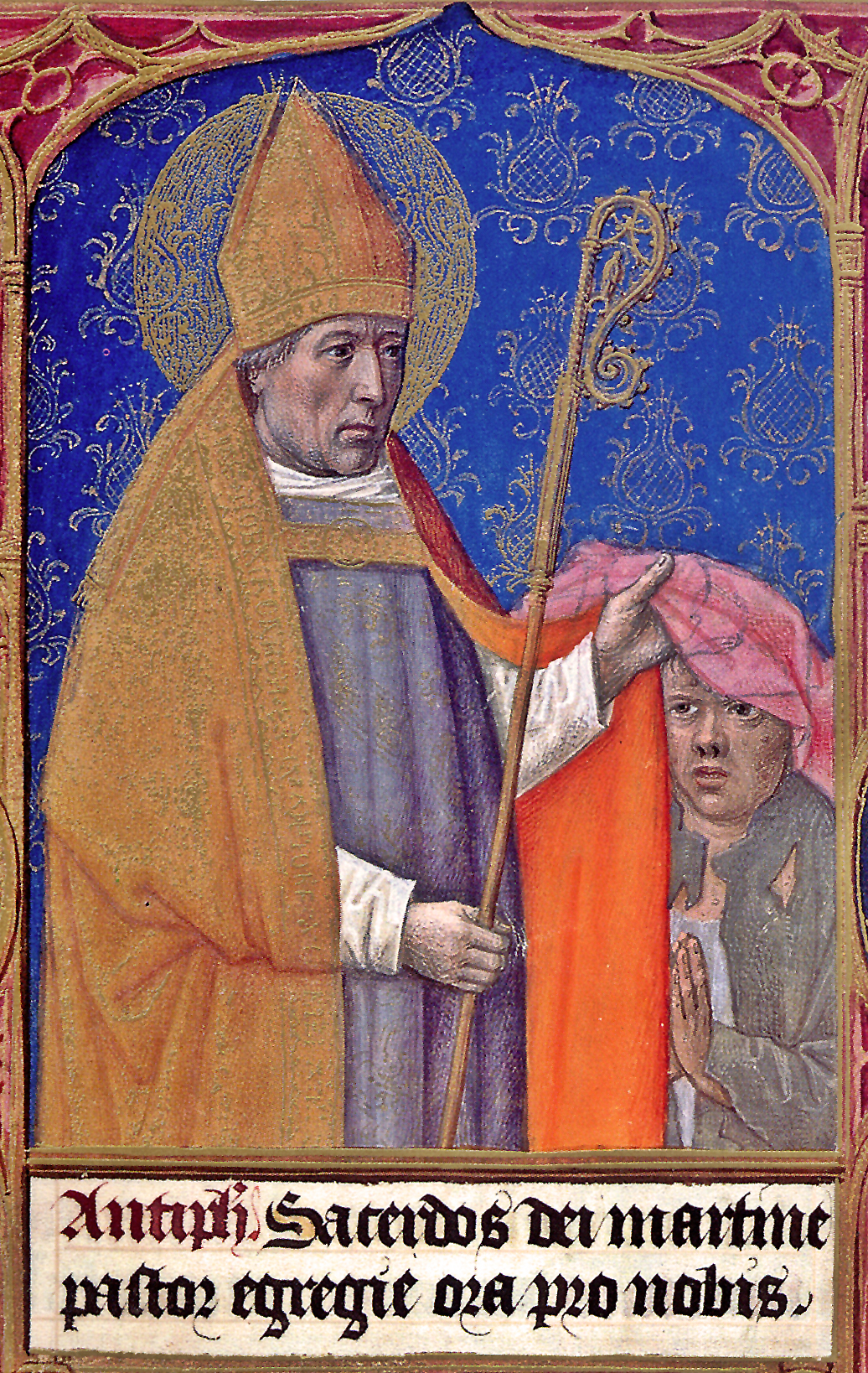

Nevertheless, given Barrientos' close relationship with the Princes of Aragón, it is reasonable to conclude that, at least at first, he was a supporter of the opposition camp. Nevertheless, he was a skillful politician who knew how to maneuver when political winds shifted in favor of John II, to save himself from misfortune.

When John II of Aragón (one of the Princes of Aragón) broke the Truce of Majano (1430) and invaded Castile, King John II of Castile, along with loyal followers including Bishop Barrientos, was forced to take shelter in Medina del Campo. Although Medina collected tolls from wayfarers, other than an extensive moat, it had few military fortifications, and was consequently not easily defended. Bishop Barrientos offered to act as a mediator with the invading forces and apparently obtained beneficial treatment for both sides. Nevertheless, everything points to the fact that he betrayed his monarch; when John II was celebrating, believing himself to be secure in the heart of Medina del Campo, troops of the Kingdom of Navarre burst into the villa where he was sheltering and took him prisoner. Although he was soon released, his detention made him a laughing stock and dishonored the prestige of the crown. It is possible to read into these events, that Barrientos was one of the instigators of the exile of Álvaro de Luna in 1439, preparing the way for the victory of the Princes of Aragón.

The passage of five years brought a dramatic change in circumstances. Although John II of Aragon had continued to occupy the region, consolidating his annexation, the death of his wife, Blanca de Navarra, forced him to leave the Castilian campaign and beat a hasty retreat home, as his own crown was in danger from the pretensions of his stepson, Charles of Viana. The power of the Princes of Aragón was sundered, and Barrientos had to react rapidly to the shifting political climate.

Barrientos' dilemma of allegiance was resolved when Álvaro de Luna returned from abroad, bringing with him the support of the Diocese of Toledo, which had practically unlimited resources, and which had granted him their patronage at the behest of his half brother, Juan de Cerezuela. Greatly aided by their financial backing and political cachet, he was able to mobilize royalist supporters of the crown to fight for the king. While the two sides geared up for war (ultimately taking place in Olmedo), Barrientos, his course now clear, traveled to the town of Madrigal de las Altas Torres (northern Ávila) to convince the heir, Prince Henry, to forbear from taking up arms against his own father.

In 1445 the Battle of Olmedo took place. The defeat of the Princes of Aragón was overwhelming. Juan de Mena chronicles the moments leading up to the engagement in his well-known poem Coplas de la Panadera ("Songs of the Baker"), in which he describes the warlike ardor of the bishop:

En cátedra de madera	(In a wooden throne
vi al obispo Barrientos	I saw bishop Barrientos
Con un dardo sin armientos,	with a spear without a thrower,
que a predicarles saliera	to preach to them he went
e por conclusión pusiera	and at the end he promised
quel que allí fuese a morir,	to those who died there in battle
Él le faría subir	that he would raise them to Heaven
al cielo sin escalera	without a ladder
Di panadera!	See the baker!)

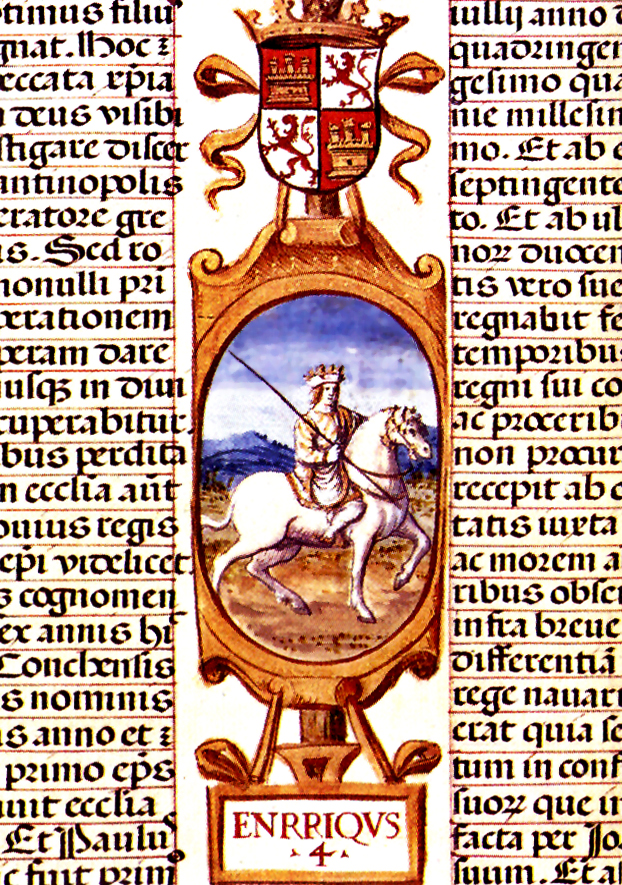
Henry IV of Castile

After the battle, Álvaro de Luna immediately initiated contact with Charles of Viana, to lend him aid in the civil war then brewing in Navarre between Charles and his stepfather, the king of Aragon. John II of Aragon ultimately defeated his stepson, and, in retaliation for de Luna's aid, in 1449 he again invaded Castilian territory, this time laying siege to Cuenca with the help of the city's chief warder, the traitor Diego de Mendoza. Barrientos was by this time the Bishop of Cuenca, and faithful to John II of Castile. Accordingly, he personally organized the defense of the city. With the help of the locals, they held back the enemy long enough for Constable de Luna to arrive with reinforcements. The invaders were eventually repelled.

The demands placed on surrounding cities to support the liberation of Cuenca led to some discord. Some citizens of the city of Toledo, for instance, were supporters of John II of Aragon and the citizenry in general resented Álvaro de Luna's call for additional tax collection to support the liberation effort. In a fit of pique, led by the city's chief warder, Pedro Sarmiento, who had for years sought to expel Toledo's converted Jews, several high-ranking tax collectors of Jewish extraction were executed. After the Navarrese were routed from Cuenca, so too fled the hopes of Toledo's malcontents, who were left with no options left but to deliver the city to the Constable. Pedro Sarmiento, however, had other plans, leading a mob in sacking and setting fire to the city's Jewish quarter. Soon thereafter, in conciliation to Álvaro de Luna, Pedro Sarmiento was put on trial by the city for the murders and pillaging committed at his instigation.

Lope de Barrientos political star kept on rising. Upon the death of Álvaro de Luna in 1453, he was appointed Chancellor of Castile, thus becoming the preeminent political figure of the region under the King. Just a year later, however, John II of Castile died and was succeeded by Henry IV. Barrientos did not fare well opposite the new king, whom he considered ineffectual and lacking in character. Henry IV was known as the impotent for his unconsummated marriage to Blanche II of Navarre. Barrientos scoffed at Henry for his failure to act in the face of rumors impugning his character, such as the infidelity of the queen with one of his confidants, and talk of his homosexuality.

Frustrated with the King, and then in his 70s, Barrientos decided to retire from politics and to concentrate on the management of his diocese in Cuenca, which he did until his death in 1469.

== Writings ==
Because the majority of Lope de Barrientos' writings are of a theological bent and addressed to issues of his era, they are more the province of scholarly study today, than of general interest. The major portion of his work is addressed to the ideological modernization of the Hispanic Church. He penned a number of treatises on the Sacraments (all in Latin), a compendium of moral theology and a Book of laws with which he hoped to contribute to the enrichment of canonical law.

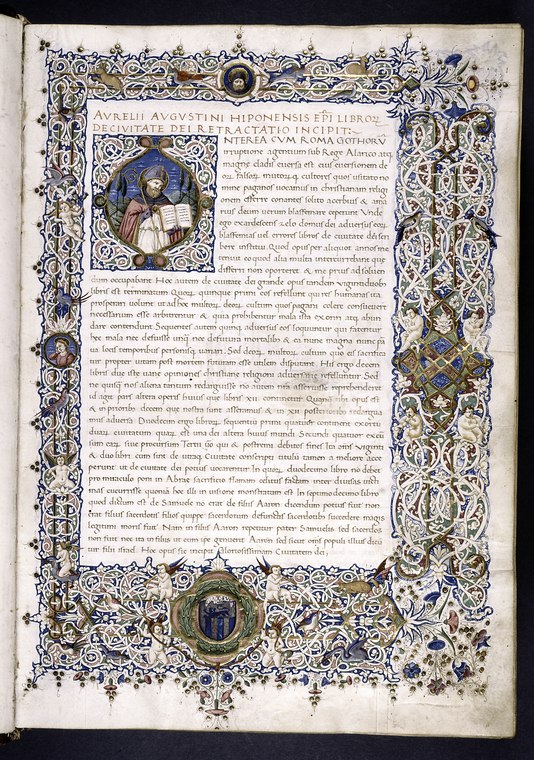
Folio 1r from a manuscript of Augustine's, City of God c. 1470

- Clavis Sapientiae: Barrientos' earliest extant work—a theological philosophy encyclopedia of the epoch. Although no originals survive, a hand-written copy is held by the national Library of Madrid.
- Opusculum super intellectu quorumdam verborum cuiusdam decreti contenti in volumine decretorum, ubi Gratianus, tractans de materia sacrilegii, XVII, q. III, ait: sacrilegii quoque reatum incurrit, qui iudaeis publica officia committit: A discussion of the social, religious, racial and doctrinal problem that, according to Lope de Barrientos, were provoked by Jews. For him, the most suitable solution was their segregation, and, if possible, their expulsion (which would occur just a few years later, partly at his instigation). Some manuscripts survive in good condition; a few in the hands of private parties and others in various cathedral archives.
- Index latinus ad sancti Antonini, Archiepiscopi Florentini, Summam Theologicam: Manuscript preserved in the file of the Cathedral of Segovia.

He also wrote several, less specialized manuscripts in Spanish, but intended for an educated audience.

- Crónica del halconero (1454): A chronicle chiefly of the life of John II of Castile, as well as of the writer, Álvar García of Santamaría.
- Contra algunos zizañadores de la nación de los convertidos del pueblo de Israel (1445–1451) ("In opposition to those who agitate against converted Israeli people"): A defense of Spanish Jewish converts. The Library of the university of Salamanca has one copy and another copy from the 17th century is in the National Library of Madrid.
- Tratado de caso e fortuna ("Treatise on Prophesies"): Written at the request of John II of Castile while Barrientos was bishop of Cuenca, it is purely scholastic and discursive, with excessive reliance on Aristotelian teachings and little original material. It was published in 1927 in Salamanca, but there are ancient copies in: the National Library of Madrid dating to 1549; another in the British Museum in London dating to the 15th century; and a last copy in the Library of the University of Salamanca.
- Tractado del dormir et despertar et del soñar et de las adevinanças et agüeros et profeçía ("Treatise on sleeping and waking; of dreaming and of divinations; of presages and prophecies"): Consists of six treatises created at the behest of John II, following his satisfaction with the Tratado de caso e fortuna, and displays a similar orthodox form. It attempts to distinguish divinely inspired dreams concerning biblical scripture and biblical figures such as Joseph, from dreams that are nothing more than dreams. It also explores the Christian theory of the prophet and the omens and riddles presented in the Bible. The British Museum of London has a number of well-preserved copies. There is one hand-written copy dating from 1559 held by the National Library of Madrid and a few more in the University of Salamanca library dating from the 15th century.

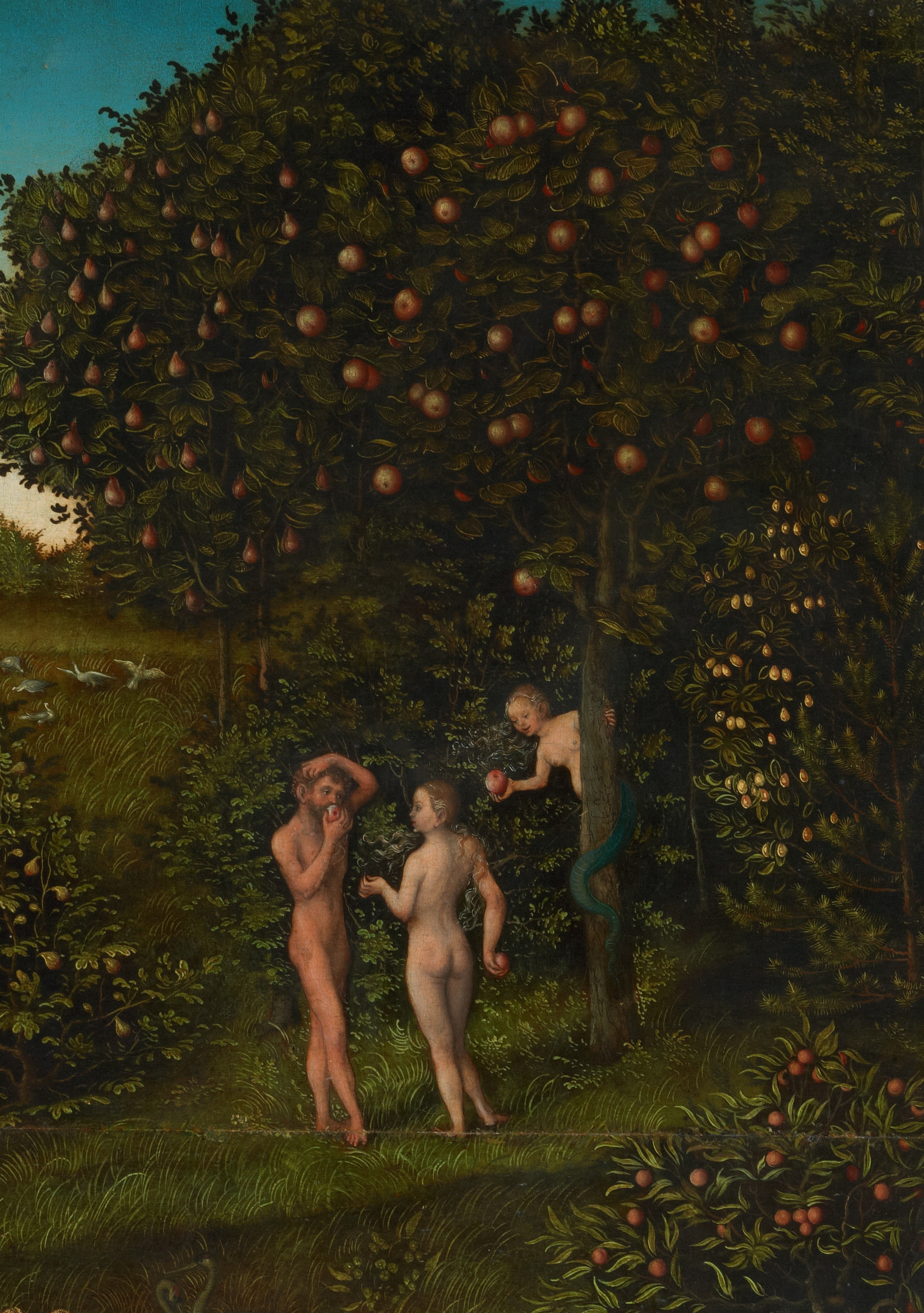
"The Fall of Man" by Lucas Cranach, c. 16th century, Germany

- Tractado de la divinança ("Treatise on divination"): Thought to be a manipulated summary of a book from the library of Enrique de Villena, but nonetheless considered Barrientos' most important work, it is a didactic sermon with philosophical pretensions that explores theories of philosophy which deny the possibility of divination, contrasting them with the religious sphere where many have been directly affected by divine intervention, as well as by the influence of evil spirits. In order to demonstrate that malignant spirits can influence the lives of men, he explores the Genesis story of Eve and the serpent in the Garden of Eden. He arrives at the conclusion that the "Artes Mágicas" (Magical Arts) were birthed by Cain, who wrote a manuscript he denominates the "Libro Raziel" (Book of Raziel), from which all magicians and their powers are derived. Although in general Barrientos thought that "casi siempre frívolas y de ninguna eficacia" (they are almost always frivolous and ineffectual), he nevertheless concludes that their eradication is necessary.

== Foundations and legacies ==
John II of Castile bestowed on Barrientos the dominions of Pascualcobo and Serranos de la Torre in Ávila, on which he built a number of estates in diverse towns. In 1451 he ordered construction of the castle of Serranos de la Torre, presently known as the Torrejón de los Serranos. Like other prominent clergyman, he devoted himself to all manner of benefactions, scholarships and other forms of charitable legacies. Some fringe historians have proposed that Lope de Barrientos founded the University Hospital of Salamanca, but there is little evidence to support this hypothesis. Among his charitable works, these stand out:

- The Hospital de la Piedad in Medina del Campo; where Barrientos was born and where he was laid to rest in its funeral chapel. He bequeathed funds to the hospital to support its continuing charitable work in aiding the indigent and needy and for support of several doctors and clergymen friendly to his diocese. Also in Medina del Campo, Barrientos directed construction of three shrines and funded the enlargement of the convento dominico de San Andrés (Dominican convent of San Andrés).
- Outside of his hometown, he emphasizes the construction of the Hospital de San Sebastián, in Cuenca, and a hermitage in Salamanca also consecrated to Saint Sebastian, in the convent of Peña de Francia. Neither of these foundations survive today.

== See also ==
- Crisis of the Late Middle Ages
- Spanish Inquisition
- Dominican Order
