= Francisco Terciado =

Spanish cyclist

Personal information
- Full name: Francisco José Terciado Sacedo
- Born: 25 March 1981 (age 45) Fuentidueña de Tajo, Spain

Cycling career
- Sport: Cycling
- Current team: Retired
- Discipline: Road
- Role: Rider

Professional teams
- 2006–2007: Relax–GAM
- 2008: Extremadura–Spiuk

Francisco José Terciado Sacedo (born 25 March 1981 in Fuentidueña de Tajo) is a Spanish former professional racing cyclist.

== Palmarès ==
2009
1st Vuelta a Navarra

1st Stage 4
