= Pedro de Zúñiga =

1st Count of Ledesma, from the House of Zúñiga (1383–1453)

Pedro de Zúñiga or Pedro de Estúñiga (Valladolid, c. 1383 – Valladolid, 1453). He was a wealthy (ricohombre) Castilian man of the House of Zúñiga, and was the son of Diego López de Zúñiga, Lord of Frías and Béjar and Alguacil and chief justice of the king, and Juana García de Leyva.

He was the first Count of Ledesma and the first Count of Plasencia and Duke of Béjar, Miranda del Castañar, Cáceres, Trujillo, Curiel, Candeleda, Olvera, Puebla de Santiago, and other towns. He was also Chief Justice of the King]], Captain General of the frontier of Navarre and Ecija, mayor of Seville and the Kingdom of Murcia and commander of the Castle of Burgos.

== Filiation ==
He was the son of Diego López de Zúñiga and Juana García de Leyva. His father was CoRegent of Castile, member of the Regent's council, justicia mayor and alguacil mayor of Castile, first Lord of Béjar, Monterrey, Baides, Bañares, Zúñiga, Mendavía and other towns, and his mother was the daughter of Sancho Martínez de Leiva, vassal of the King of Castile and the King of England, and his wife Princess Isabel, daughter of King Edward III of England.

In 1407, Pedro married Isabel Elvira de Guzmán y Ayala, III Lady of Gibraleón, daughter of Alvar Pérez de Guzmán, II Lord of Gibraleón, and his wife Elvira de Ayala. The marriage contracts were granted by his father Diego López de Zúñiga, I Lord of Béjar, and by Elvira de Ayala, widow of Alvar Pérez de Guzmán, II Lord of Gibraleón, parents of Isabel, on June 26, 1395. By the bull of Benedict XIII, July 11, 1402, they obtained a dispensation of consanguinity, for being relatives of 4th degree. Isabel de Guzmán y Ayala granted her husband Pedro the donation of the town of Olvera (Cádiz), as a dowry in a document dated August 9, 1407. They had several children in their marriage:

- Álvaro, their first-born, II Count of Plasencia, I Duke of Plasencia, I Duke of Béjar, I Count of Bañares,
- Diego López de Zúñiga, Count of Miranda del Castañar,
- Elvira, wife of Juan Alonso Pimentel, Count of Mayorga, and widow married to Pedro Álvarez Osorio, I Count of Trastámara, III Count of Villalobos,
- Juana and Isabel, nuns.

== At the service of the Kings of Castile and Leon ==
=== Regency of the Infant Fernando, during the minority of age of King Juan II of Castile ===
Pedro was seven years old when he had to serve as a pledge for the fulfillment of the agreements made in the Courts of Burgos in 1392. Pedro, Mayor of Seville since 1407, and Lord of Gibraleón through his marriage, Pedro participated in the Campaign of Steneil with his troops from Extremadura and Seville along with the army of the Regent of Castile, the Infant Fernando, and made his first forays into battle during the siege of Setenil between October and November 1407. In 1407, he conquered Cañete, near Olvera and in Ayamonte (province of Huelva), the castle of Ayamonte, located on the outskirts of the village. King Juan II of Castile gave him this castle as a reward. Pedro, accompanied by his brother Íñigo, went over with his host and cut down orchards and vineyards in the land of Ronda and in the Vega of Granada. He took part in the conquest and occupation of Antequera, which was liberated by the Prince Fernando on September 16, 1410, who from then on was called Fernando "of Antequera".

His father sent him to Seville in mid-1416 to Seville to obtain the governorship of the city. In 1417, Ortun Velásquez was appointed Corregidor of Seville to support the claims of Pedro, but the corregimiento was not granted to him. The rumor about the illicit loves of Alonso Perez de Guzmán, Lord of Ayamonte, husband of Leonor sister of Pedro, with Mencia de Figueroa, that although they began before their marriage and in which she had children, did not cease in the affection that he had her, which made of them two furious contracting ones, in addition both were greater mayors of Seville. In 1416 an open fight broke out between the two sides and outrages arose and blood flowed in abundance. But in 1418, both parties united in enmity against Pedro Ponce de León, V Lord of Marchena.

=== Reign of John II of Castile ===
The reign of John II of Castile began on March 6, 1419, at the age of 14 . The Infant Henry of Aragon, son of King Ferdinand I of Aragon, with his troops seized the royal palace of Tordesillas and on July 14, 1420, the king John II, his first cousin. This coup marked the beginning of the civil wars during the reign of Juan II. After the coup of Tordesillas, Pedro de Zúñiga and Sancho de Rojas, Archbishop of Toledo, both supporters of King John II, left Olmedo and had to seek safe refuge. Encouraged by letters from King John II written in Montalbán, Pedro mobilized his troops in November 1420, as did the Prince Juan de Aragón, Sancho de Rojas and other supporters. Álvaro de Luna, who had assumed an important position in the government of King Juan II, offered himself as a mediator between the royal houses. He succeeded in doing so in the battle of El Espinar on September 13, 1421. The Infant Enrique licensed his army. Alvaro de Luna continued with a strategic policy of ruling as valid of King Juan II and strengthening his personal power. The Infant Enrique was captured on June 14, 1422.

By royal privilege of April 11, 1420, King John II confirmed to Pedro de Zúñiga the office of Alcalde Mayor of Seville. By royal privilege of June 5, 1420, he confirmed the agreement made by his father King Enrique III with Diego López de Zúñiga, first Lord of Béjar, to exchange the city of Béjar for that of Frías, and by royal privilege of June 29, 1420, he confirmed the palatine offices of Alguacil Mayor and Major Justice of Castile, that his father King Enrique III had granted to Diego López de Zúñiga, Pedro's father, on November 15, 1401.

After the capture of the fortress of Jódar, which took place on August 14, 1422, the government of Castile was composed of 9 members. One of them was Pedro de Zúñiga. The members of the government of Castile signed the sentence of imprisonment of Prince Henry of Aragon and shared his stolen wealth. Pedro received the lordship of Candeleda, by royal privilege of September 6, 1423, the estates of Ruy López Dávalos, former constable of Castile, located in Puebla de Alcocer, Badajoz, and in the surrounding area, as well as the goods confiscated from García Manrique. Álvaro de Luna, already valid of King Juan II, was appointed on December 10, 1423, constable of Castile. His relative Alfonso de Zúñiga, took the letters of protocol from King John II to King Alfonso V of Aragon in February 1424. The infant, the future King Henry IV of Castile, was born in Valladolid on January 5, 1425, with Alvaro de Luna as his godfather. King Alfonso V of Aragon, cousin of King John II of Castile, threatened to invade Castile if the Infante Henry of Aragon was not given his freedom. Pedro de Zúñiga and other former friends of King Henry III of Castile suspect the true intentions of King Alfonso V of Aragon and prevent negotiations. By the Treaty of the Tower of Arciel of September 3, 1425, Prince Enrique regained his freedom and his lordships. King John II, in a letter dated November 23, 1425, pardoned Pedro and his friends and relatives, for freeing Prince Henry of Aragon from prison.

Pedro and the House of Zúñiga sided with Prince Juan of Aragon, brother of Prince Enrique, who was proclaimed King of Navarre after the death of King Carlos III of Navarre on September 7, 1425. The princes of Aragon Juan, Enrique and Pedro, joined the nobiliary league composed of the main sector of the nobility, especially the Zúñigas, Velascos, Manriques and Mendozas, to dominate the royal council and to eliminate Álvaro de Luna as valid of King Juan II of Castile. The sentence of the banishment of Álvaro de Luna was pronounced on September 4, 1425. Pedro, by order of King Juan II, executed the aldermen Vélez and Tamayo who led the opposition. Alvaro de Luna regained power by uniting his rivals in the reconciliation of January 30, 1428. King John II of Castile offered Alvaro de Luna the administration of the Order of Santiago in January 1430. The government of the valid Álvaro de Luna lasted until 1437.

The expulsion of King John of Navarren from Castile was considered as an offense by his brother King Alfonso V of Aragon. In August 1429 the armies of King John II of Castile, of the constable Alvaro de Luna, of Pedro de Zúñiga, chief justice of Castile, and of other great men of Castile invaded the kingdom of Aragon. The King Juan II established his royalty in the village of Ariza, where the castle was conquered after a fight. It did not come to a battle with the Aragonese, so after a few days King Juan II ordered the retreat, leaving the border defended. The Castilian army returned to Peñafiel on August 31, 1429, to secure the fortress. The kings of Castile and Aragon signed a 5-year truce in the village of Mojano on July 15, 1430.

The Royal Council, in its session of February 17, 1430, disposed of lordships and goods to an oligarchy that from now on would aspire to more power. Pedro received from Juan II, by royal privilege of December 8, 1429, the town of Ledesma with the title of I Count of Ledesma, as well as the town of Candeleda. King John II of Castile ordered the Council of Ledesma, La Rioja, to receive with homage Pedro de Zúñiga, II Lord of Béjar, Count of Ledesma, as his natural lord, cancelling the homage that had been paid to Queen Leonor of Aragon. Prince Enrique of Aragon, in a document dated November 6, 1439, renounced in favor of Pedro de Zúñiga, Count of Ledesma, the right that he could have to the town of Ledesma.

The wedding of the constable Álvaro de Luna, already a widower, with his second wife Juana Pimentel, daughter of the Count of Benavente, celebrated in Palencia on January 27, 1431, served as a pretext to confirm the reconciliation of the constable with the noble oligarchy, composed of prominent members of the Luna, Manrique, Enríquez, Pimentel, Zúñiga, Velasco, Mendoza, Carrillo, Toledo and Guzmán lineages.

==== War of Granada (1430–1439) ====
The valid Álvaro de Luna decided to resume the fight against the kingdom of Granada, to punish Emir Muhammad IX "the Left Handed". The war began in the fall of 1430, with skirmishes on the border with the Moors. In January 1431 the Cortes of Palencia granted the necessary subsidies for the war. On June 26, 1431, the armies of the king and the great armies of Castile under the command of King John II crossed the border and the royal army was installed in the Vega of Granada, at the foot of the Sierra Delvira, in the village of Atarfe, 1 league from Granada on June 29. Pedro, with his host and accompanied by his brothers Diego, Íñigo Ortiz and Gonzalo, Bishop of Jaen, and Gonzalo's sons, participated in the united army of King John II of Castile. On Sunday, July 1, 1431, Luis de Guzmán, Master of Calatrava, who was in charge of the royal guard, was surprised by the Moors. King John II sent to his aid the armies of Pedro, Count of Ledesma, Enrique de Guzmán, Count of Niebla, and Garcia Fernandez Manrique, Count of Castañeda. The battle began to develop and the Castilian armies, after a bloody fight, achieved the defeat of the Moorish army of the Emir Mohammed IX "the Left Handed". In the Battle Room of El Escorial Palace, the painting that immortalizes this battle can be seen, called the Battle of La Higueruela. Pedro and his army were known as brave and disciplined warriors who fought and conquered whatever Pedro ordered them to do. The War of Granada of this decade was rich in warlike and victorious encounters for the Castilians, achieving the retreat of the frontier in all its extension.

==== Opposition of the Nobiliary League ====
Pedro attended the wedding of the Prince of Asturias, the future King Henry IV of Castile, with the Infanta Blanca of Navarre, daughter of King John II of Aragon and Navarre, celebrated in Alfaro on March 12, 1437. The bride and groom were 12 years old. At the beginning of 1437, the oligarchic trio made up of Pedro Manrique de Lara, Mayor adelantado of León, Fadrique Enríquez, Admiral of Castile, and Pedro de Zúñiga, Count of Ledesma, heads of important and wealthy families, took an openly critical stance against the excessive power of Álvaro de Luna, Constable of Castile and valid of King John II. In February 1437, Álvaro de Luna ordered the arrest of Pedro Manrique, who had held the second position in the Royal Council since 1430. Pedro Manrique was captured on August 13, 1437. With the help of Álvaro, the first-born son of Pedro de Zúñiga, Pedro Manrique managed to escape during the night of August 20–21, 1438. The conspiratorial trio prepared the rebellion against Álvaro de Luna. Pedro, supported by many Sevillians, fought skirmishes with the Moors on the border of Ecija in early 1438. Pedro left the frontier at the end of 1438 and arrived and with his warriors in Rioseco, Burgos, after crossing Extremadura without a fight. His brother Íñigo Ortiz de Zúñiga, Marshal of Castile, took Valladolid in the second half of March 1439. In the Treaty of Renedo, in May 1439, the Prince of Asturias, Enrique, decided to re-establish the League of Nobles. They met in Tordesillas in June 1439 with King John II of Castile, the Princes of Aragon, Enrique and Pedro, Alvaro de Luna, constable of Castile, Pedro de Zúñiga, Count of Ledesma, and the other members of the Nobiliary League.

Pedro Fernández de Velasco, Count of Haro, who later wrote the chronicle "El Seguro de Tordesillas", was appointed mediator. In the "El Seguro de Tordesillas", Pedro de Zúñiga, Count of Ledesma, Pedro de Castilla, Bishop of Osma, Sancho de Rojas, Bishop of Astorga, Luis de la Cerda, Count of Medinaceli and other nobles swore by a document dated June 19, 1439, to accept what the King of Navarre and the Prince Henry would determine, so that the disturbances in the kingdom would cease. King John II of Castile authorized the Count of Haro to grant insurance to Pedro, Count of Ledesma, and his warrior, by a decree of June 27, 1439. Pedro, with his troops already quartered in Valladolid, marched to Roa and fought a skirmish on the outskirts of Roa on June 27, 1439. As a result of this victory, the army of King Juan of Navarre joined him and the valid Álvaro de Luna capitulated without help. On October 22, 1439, it was agreed, among other things, not to exercise any right or claim to the villas or goods given to the marshal Íñigo Ortiz de Zúñiga. King Juan II, in a decree of August 4, 1440, approved the action taken by Pedro to leave the border that separated the Christians of the Kingdom of Granada, with the intention of suffocating and pacifying the uprisings that had occurred in Valladolid and other cities of the kingdom.

The heads of the Castilian oligarchic clans, members of the League of Nobles, Fadrique Enriquez, Admiral of Castile, Pedro Fernandez de Velasco, Count of Haro, Pedro de Zuñiga, Count of Ledesma, Rodrigo Alonso Pimentel, Count of Benavente, Pedro Manrique, Mayor adelantado of Leon, Íñigo López de Mendoza and Enrique, Prince of Aragon, Lord of Santiago, celebrated a pact with Maria, Queen of Castile, and Juan, King of Navarre, on January 30, 1440, in which they promised and bound themselves to be good and faithful friends to each other in the service of King Juan II of Castile. In the capitulation of the king before the league of March 22, 1440, the king committed himself to love and preserve the 3 states (nobility, church and fueros). In September 1440, the Cortes published an extensive program that recognized and redefined the functions of the organs of the monarchy: the Council of the Crown, the Audiencia and the Courts.

Pedro participated in the wedding of the Prince of Asturias, Enrique, the future Enrique IV of Castile, with the Infanta Blanca of Navarra, daughter of King Juan II of Aragon and Navarra, which was celebrated with great pomp in Valladolid on September 15, 1440. King Juan II granted Pedro de Zúñiga the city of Trujillo, Cáceres, in exchange for the city of Ledesma, La Rioja, with an oath of inheritance and the title of Count, in a privilege dated October 22, 1440, and by Royal Decree of November 4, 1440, he confirmed that he had given Pedro de Zúñiga, by oath of inheritance, the city of Trujillo with the title of Count and the villages of Cañamero and Berzocana (Cáceres), in exchange for the county of Ledesma, which was restored to Prince Enrique of Aragon in 1440. Trujillo resisted with armed force to be estranged from the Crown. Gómez González de Carvajal, commander of the fortress of Trujillo, and Juan de Sotomayor, Master of the Order of Alcántara, helped and encouraged the city of Trujillo in its resistance. King Juan II, of whom the chroniclers said: "He never had the color or the taste of a king", wrote a letter to the city of Trujillo, given in Avila on February 26, 1441, in which he blamed Pedro de Zúñiga, King of Navarre, and the infant Enrique for the rebellions and insults.

==== Civil War (1441–1443) ====
The members of the Noble League, composed of the Admiral Fadrique Enriquez, the Count of Benavente, Juan Alonso Pimentel, and the Count of Ledesma, Pedro de Zúñiga, signed a manifesto to the cities in Arévalo on January 21, 1441, asking for their support against the counteroffensive of Alvaro de Luna and sending a sign of defiance to Álvaro de Luna. On the same day, King Juan II ordered the cities to wage war against the rebellious nobles. In April 1441, Pedro, Count of Ledesma, and his kinsmen were defeated in Extremadura by the Lord of Alcántara, Gutierre de Sotomayor. In this civil war, the royal forces led by King Juan II and his lieutenant Álvaro de Luna fought skirmishes with the forces of the nobility between June 2 and 8, 1441.

In Medina, the supporters of the nobility facilitated the entry of the army of the King of Navarre on the night of June 28–29, 1441. The surprise caused total confusion. Faced with this superiority of arms, the Archbishop of Seville, Alonso Pérez de Vivero, and the Count of Alba, Fernán Álvarez de Toledo, supporters of the valid Álvaro de Luna, surrendered and the valid fled. In the sentence of Medina of July 10, 1441, the banishment of Álvaro de Luna from Castile was ordered for 6 years. The cortes were purged of the supporters of the valid, the royal council was reorganized, composed of three grandes, two prelates, two knights and four doctors, it was decided to help the queen of Portugal, cousin of King John II, to recover her throne. The victory of the nobility only served to satisfy a simple substitution of factions, without establishing a stable oligarchic political regime on a legal basis.

King John II and Queen Mary promised and assured to give Pedro the city of Plasencia with the title of Count of Plasencia in exchange for those of Ledesma and Trujillo, by deed of December 23, 1441. King Juan II and Queen Maria, by deed of January 1, 1442, order the Council of the City of Plasencia, Cáceres, that they receive and obey as their natural lord Pedro de Zúñiga, who, by virtue of the mercy the King has shown him, is Count and Lord of it. In a document dated January 1, 1442, the Count of Plasencia, Pedro de Zúñiga, was granted possession of the town of Plasencia and its territory. InIn the course of the 15th century, the municipalities lost their administrative freedom and were replaced by very powerful feudal states, such as that of Stúñiga, but without in any way changing the way of life of the towns. The valid Álvaro de Luna gave the Zúñigas a terrible rival in the control of Salamanca and the domination of Extremadura, when King Juan II of Castile elevated Fernán Álvarez de Toledo to the Count of Alba de Tormes in 1439.

==== Intervention of King John II of Aragon and Navarre ====
With the coup d'état of Ramaga on July 9, 1443, King Juan II of Aragon and Navarre obtained the definitive expulsion of the supporters of the valid, demanded the reestablishment of the nobility league in the government and made King Juan II of Castile his prisoner. The nobility realized that with this coup d'état it was a fiction to believe that King John II of Aragon and Navarre and the princes of Aragon wanted to impose a legal regime of nobility. Pedro, Count of Plasencia, his sons Álvaro and Diego, as well as Pedro Fernández de Velasco, Count of Haro, and his brother Fernando, signed a confederation on September 21, 1443, to free King John II from the oppression in which he found himself, promising to help each other until the king was free and the kingdom was pacified. King Juan II of Aragon and Navarre was the son of King Ferdinand I of Aragon (Ferdinand "of Antequera") and Queen Leonor of Alburquerque. His first marriage to Princess Blanca of Navarre produced Carlos, Prince of Viana, and his second marriage to Juana Enriquez, daughter of Admiral I of Castile, produced Alonso Enriquez, the future King Ferdinand II of Aragon "the Catholic".

Pedro de Zúñiga, 1st Count of Plasencia, recruited troops at the end of 1443 in Burgos, where he held the lease of the castle, and joined them to those of the Count of Haro, the Count of Castañeda, the Prince of Asturias, Enrique, and the valid Álvaro de Luna, who opposed King Juan II of Aragon and Navarre and the Princes of Aragon. The valid was called by the intervention of Bishop Barrientos. In the unexpected battle of Olmedo, fought on May 19, 1445, initiated by a skirmish between Rodrigo Manrique and Enrique, Prince of Asturias, the united armies of King Juan II of Castile, the valid Álvaro de Luna and the nobles defeated the armies of King Juan II of Aragon and Navarre. Pedro de Zúñiga went to this battle carried in a litter by his old age and wounds suffered in the wars with the Moors to the royal of King Juan II, accompanied by his sons Álvaro and Diego, who stood out in this battle. He kissed the King's hand and offered him his life and possessions, wishing to die fighting for his cause. The troops of the nobles, including those of Pedro, who fought on the side of King Juan II, were dismissed.

As a result of this victory, a series of distributions were made in favor of the supporters of the valid one. But Pedro, Count of Plasencia, lost the possession of the castle of Burgos. The dissatisfied of the reconciliation after the battle of Olmedo, the prince of Asturias, Enrique, the admiral of Castile, Fadrique Enríquez, the Count of Benavente, Juan Alonso Pimentel and the Count of Plasencia, don Pedro de Zúñiga, begin to gather troops in the first months of the year 1446. In the concord of Astudillo of May 14, 1446, between King Juan II and his son the prince of Asturias, Enrique IV, compensation was agreed upon. Álvaro de Luna, Count of San Esteban de Gormaz, constable of Castile, Pedro de Zúñiga, Count of Plasencia, and his son Álvaro de Zúñiga signed an alliance on January 24, 1446. King John II contracted his second marriage at the age of 42 with Princess Isabella of Portugal at the instigation and negotiation of his valid Alvaro de Luna. The wedding took place on July 22, 1447, in Madrigal de las Altas Torres.

In the coup d'état of Záfraga, the day of the reconciliation between King John II and his son, the Prince of Asturias, Enrique, which took place on May 11, 1448, several nobles were imprisoned by order of the valid Álvaro de Luna, which meant a declaration of war on the nobility. On July 26, 1449, the great league of nobles was formed in Coruña del Conde. This league was formed by King John II of Aragon and Navarre, the Prince of Asturias, Henry IV, the Admiral of Castile, Fadrique Enriquez, the Count of Plasencia, Pedro de Zúñiga, the Count of Benavente, Juan Alonso Pimentel, the Count of Haro, Pedro Fernández de Velasco, the Marquis of Santillana, Íñigo López de Mendoza and other nobles. In the Concordia de Palomares of October 1449, it was agreed to return the castle of Burgos to the Count of Plasencia, Pedro de Zúñiga. The reconciliation of Álvaro de Luna with the nobility was sworn in Tordesillas on February 21, 1451, and confirmed by King John II of Castile on March 10, 1451.

==== Fall of the valid Álvaro de Luna, constable of Castile ====
In the summer of 1452 the enmity between the constable Álvaro de Luna and the prince of Asturias, Enrique IV, became critical again. The prince of Asturias took over the government and demanded the restoration of the League of Nobles and the return of the goods to the Aragonese. Pedro de Zúñiga, Count of Plasencia, became the head of the League of Nobles. Álvaro de Luna tried to take Béjar and seize Pedro, but one of Álvaro de Luna's loyalists, Alonso Pérez de Vivero, revealed the condestable's plans and the condestable, Álvaro de Luna, failed. Pedro de Zúñiga decided to act openly and sought the help of the Prince of Asturias, the families of Velasco, Mendoza and Pimentel in the fight against the valid Álvaro de Luna, now a tyrant.

The nobiliary league tried to take Valladolid at the beginning of 1453, but without success. King Juan II of Castile, convinced by Queen Isabella, was willing to eliminate his valid by means of a king of arms. The king appointed Diego López de Zúñiga y Navarra, a great warrior, nephew of Pedro, as his King of Arms. The king and the court decided to move to Burgos, where the castle belonged to the Zúñiga family. The Queen obtained a document from the King legalizing the rebellion of Pedro de Zúñiga, Count of Plasencia, and authorizing the imprisonment of Álvaro de Luna. This order was sent directly from Queen Isabella to the Countess of Plasencia. Before March 30, 1453, Pedro sent his son Álvaro to Curiel with troops. Álvaro was ordered to go to Burgos in the name of the king. On the night of April 1 to 2, Alvaro and his soldiers entered the castle of Burgos. King Jaume II of Castile, tormented by doubts and hesitations, finally signed the order to arrest the valid and his followers on April 3. On April 4, 1453, after a struggle, the valid and his followers finally surrendered in Burgos. The valid was imprisoned in the fortress of Portillo, under the custody of Diego López de Zúñiga y Navarra. King Juan II ordered the trial of Valid, who was sentenced to death. The order of execution was given by the King. Álvaro de Luna was beheaded in the main square of Valladolid on June 3, 1453.

Pedro was the most prominent member of the noble oligarchy during the reign of Juan II of Castile.

== Lordship life ==
Upon the death of his father Diego in 1417, he came to inherit and was II Lord of Béjar, Miranda del Castañar, Cáceres, Trujillo, Curiel, Candeleda, la Puebla de Santiago, and other towns. The inhabitants of Béjar, represented by their council, in a letter dated October 31, 1417, pay homage to Pedro II, Lord of Béjar. On October 26, 1426, King Juan II revoked the will of his father, Diego, I, Lord of Béjar, in favor of Pedro, II, Lord of Béjar, because of the clauses concerning the succession and the division of the estate, considering them detrimental to the House of Béjar.

Pedro de Zúñiga and Pedro Manrique, mayor adelantado of León, arranged the marriage of their sons Álvaro (their firstborn) with Isabel in January 1428. The testimonies of the marriage contracts and the payment of the dowry were granted on April 25, 1431.

From May 1430, Pedro had to endure long civil litigation with Enrique de Guzmán, II Count of Niebla, over the ownership of the land of La Algaba, Seville.

By deed of February 6, 1435, it testified the taking of possession made on in the name of Isabel de Guzmán, III Lady of Gibraleón, and her husband Pedro de Zúñiga, I Count of Ledesma, of several estates, towers, pastures and other goods located in Seville, Carmona (Seville), Palos de la Frontera (Huelva) and Purlena (Almeria), which they inherited on the death of Elvira de Ayala, widow of Alvar Perez de Guzmán, II Lord of Gibraleón, her father.

The Bishop of Salamanca grants absolution and dispensation by consanguinity for the marriage of Elvira de Zúñiga, daughter of Pedro, Count of Plasencia, to Juan Alonso Pimentel, Count of Mayorga, son of Rodrigo Alonso Pimentel, Count of Benavente, by document dated December 31, 1433. By letter of payment and oath granted by mosén Diego de Bodillo on May 6, 1434, of a certain amount of money received by Juan Alonso Pimentel, Count of Mayorga, from Pedro de Zúñiga, II Lord of Béjar, for the dowry of his daughter Elvira, the obligation was testamentary.

His wife Isabel granted the will on November 17, 1435. Pedro granted the deed of Arras, oath and ratification of the same in favor of Doña Aldonza de Avellaneda, Lady of Avellaneda and Aza, for the marriage of his son Diego with the said Aldonza, dated August 5, 1439. ope Nicholas V, by Apostolic Letter of January 12, 1447, confirmed to Pedro the possession of the Tercias of the Archpriesthood of Peñafiel, Valladolid, which his father Diego had. In a letter dated December 1, 1450, Pedro renounced the mayorship of Seville in favor of his son Álvaro.

The King Juan II of Castile by royal faculty of August 9, 1453, grants license to Pedro and his wife Isabel so that they can found mayorazgos of all their goods. Pedro had his palace built in Plasencia in the existing castle, known today as the Castle Palace of the Marquis of Mirabel.

Pedro was widely regarded to be a hardworking and courageous knight by chroniclers, who for his worth and merits was praised by King John II of Castile and by his son the Prince of Asturias, Henry IV. Other chroniclers also characterize him as a man of good sense and an industrious gentleman.

Pedro left his last will and testament in Béjar on March 11, 1450, and a codicil in 1453. King John II confirmed the will and codicil by royal decree on November 26, 1453. Pedro died in his palace in Valladolid in July 1453 and was buried in the Church of the convent of the Holy Trinity of Valladolid, where his parents were also buried (the convent of the Trinitarians does not exist today, it was located in the Plaza de la Trinidad in Valladolid).

== See also ==
- House of Zúñiga
- Count of Plasencia

== Bibliography ==
- Menéndez Pidal, Ramón (1964). Historia de España, Tomo XV, Los Trastámaras de Castilla y Aragón en el siglo XV (in Spanish). Madrid: Editorial Espasa-Calpe.
- Cátedra, Pedro M. (2003). La Historia de la Casa de Zúñiga, atribuida a Mosén Diego de Valera (in Spanish) (Seminario de Estudios Medievales y Renacentistas. Universidad de Salamanca ed.). Salamanca: Sociedad de Estudios Medievales y Renacentistas. ISBN 84-932346-9-9.
- Ortiz de Zúñiga, Diego (1677). Annales Eclesiásticos y Seculares de la muy Noble y muy Leal Ciudad de Sevilla, Metrópoli de Andaluzía,... desde el año de 1246... hasta el de 1671... (in Spanish). Madrid: Imprenta Real.
- Fernández, Fray Alonso (1627). Historia y Anales de la Ciudad y Obispado de Plasencia (in Spanish) (Cicon Ediciones, Badajoz ed.). Madrid: Impr. Juan González.
- Flores, José Miguel de (1784). Crónica de don Álvaro de Luna, Condestable de los Reynos de Castilla y León, Maestre y Administrador de la Orden y Caballería de Santiago (in Spanish). Madrid: Imprenta de Antonio de Sancha.
- Vilar Pascual, Luis (1864). Diccionario Histórico Genealógico y Heráldico de las Familias Ilustres de la Monarquía Española, Tomo VII (in Spanish). Madrid: Impr. de F. Sanchez.
- Pulgar, Fernando de (1789). Claros Varones de Castilla y Letras de Fernando de Pulgar (in Spanish). Madrid: Impr. G. Ortega e hijos de Ibarra.
- Salazar y Acha, Jaime de (2000). La casa del Rey de Castilla y León en la Edad Media (in Spanish). Historia de la Sociedad Política collection, directed by Bartolomé Clavero Salvador (Centro de Estudios Políticos y Constitucionales ed.). Madrid: Rumagraf S.A. ISBN 978-84-259-1128-6.
- "AER (Archivos Españoles en Red)". pares.mcu.es (in Spanish). August 22, 2018. Archived from the original on January 17, 2020.

| Preceded by Newly created title | Count of Ledesma; 1430–1441 | Succeeded by Reverted to the Crown of Castile |
| Preceded by Newly created title | Count of Plasencia; 1441–1453 | Succeeded by Álvaro de Zúñiga y Pérez de Guzmán |
