= Pedro da Fonseca (cardinal) =

Portuguese bishop and Papal legate

His Eminence Pedro da Fonseca
- Cardinal-Deacon of Sant'Angelo in Pescheria
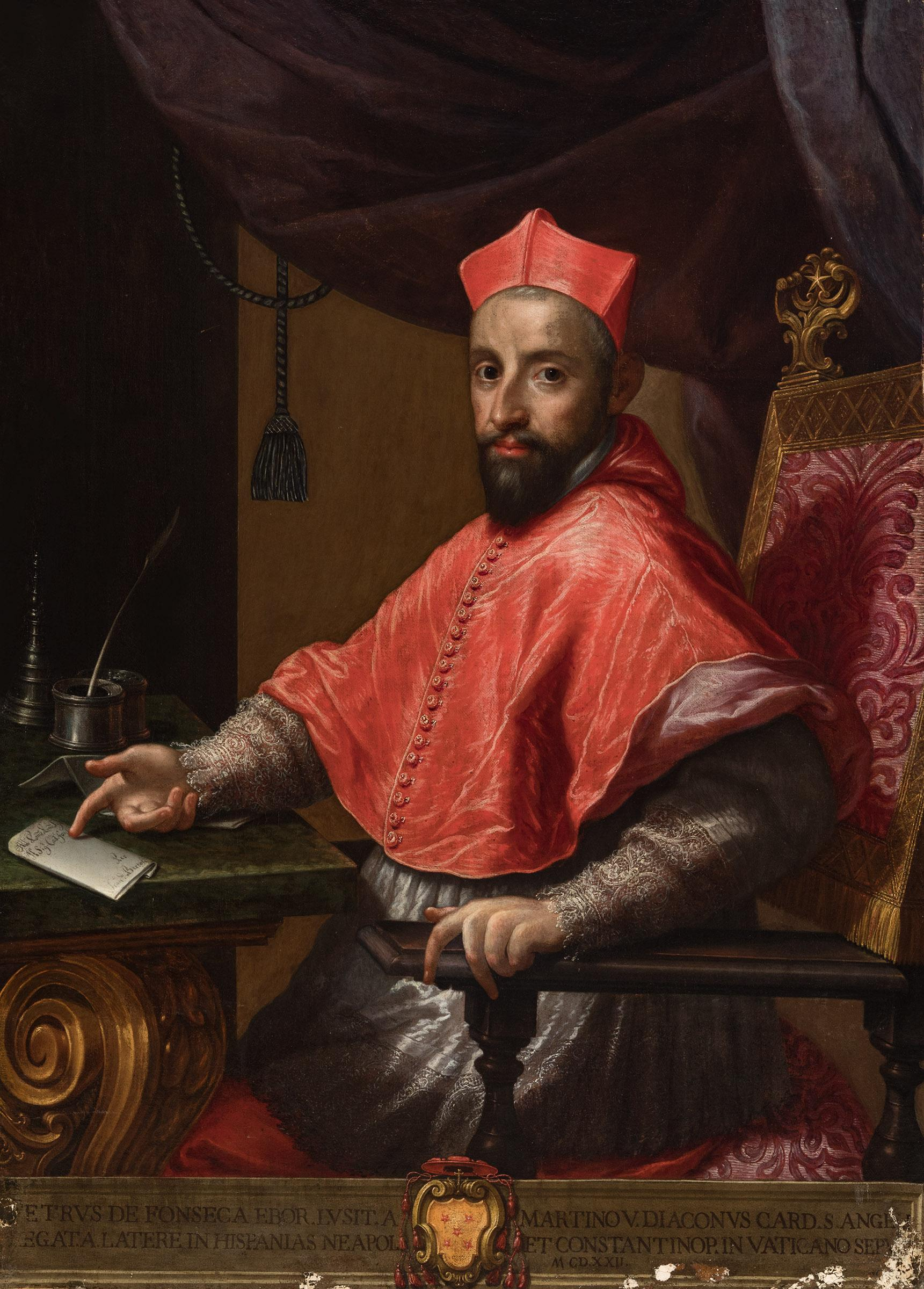
- Appointed: 14 December 1412
- Term ended: 22 August 1422
- Other posts: Bishop of Astorga (1413-1419); Bishop of Sigüenza

Orders
- Created cardinal: 14 Dec 1412
- Rank: Cardinal-Deacon

Personal details
- Born: Olivença, Portugal
- Died: 22 August 1422
- Denomination: Roman Catholic
- Coat of arms

Pedro da Fonseca (14th century – 22 August 1422) was a Portuguese Cardinal who served as Bishop of Astorga, 1414–1418, and Bishop of Sigüenza, 1419–1422.

== Biography ==
He was born in Olivença. On 14 December 1412, he was made Cardinal-priest of Sant'Angelo in Pescheria by the Avignon Antipope Benedict XIII. On 5 June 1413, Pedro da Fonseca was appointed Administrator of Astorga and on 6 Jun 1419, he was transferred to the Diocese of Sigüenza where he served as Administrator until his resignation on 7 Jun 1419. Accepting the decisions made at the Council of Pisa and Council of Constance, Cardinal Fonseca formally recognized Martin V as Pope. Following Byzantine Emperor Manuel II and Patriarch Joseph II's request for legation, Fonseca was sent to Constantinople as a Papal Legate in 1420.

On 27 September 1421 he was assigned as the Papal Legate at Naples. The kingdoms of Naples and Sicily, in Italy were then ruled by the Aragonese King, Alfonso V of Aragon. On 22 August 1422, during the visit of the Pope to the Aragonese king at Vicovaro, he died after falling down the stairs at the monastery of Saint Cosimato.

First buried at the Chapel of Saint Thomas in the Vatican, his remains were moved to the Vatican Grotto in 1608, between the tombs of Innocent IV and Marcellus II.

== External links and additional sources ==
- Cheney, David M. "Diocese of Sigüenza-Guadalajara". Catholic-Hierarchy.org. (for Chronology of Bishops) ^{[self-published]}
- Chow, Gabriel. "Diocese of Sigüenza–Guadalajara (Spain)". GCatholic.org. (for Chronology of Bishops) ^{[self-published]}
- Cheney, David M. "Diocese of Astorga". Catholic-Hierarchy.org. (for Chronology of Bishops) ^{[self-published]}
- Chow, Gabriel. "Diocese of Astorga (Spain)". GCatholic.org. (for Chronology of Bishops) ^{[self-published]}

Catholic Church titles
Preceded by Pietro Stefaneschi	Cardinal-Deacon of Sant'Angelo in Pescheria; 1412–1422	Succeeded by Giuliano Cesarini (seniore)
Preceded by	Administrator of Astorga; 1413–1419	Succeeded by
Preceded by Juan Gonzalez Fernandez de Illescas	Administrator of Sigüenza; 1419–1422	Succeeded by Alfonso Carrillo de Albornoz
