= Alfonso Carrillo de Albornoz =

15th-century Catholic cardinal

His Eminence Alfonso Carrillo de Albornoz
- Cardinal-Priest of Santi Quattro Coronati; Apostolic Administrator of Sigüenza
- Church: Catholic Church

Personal details
- Born: Cuenca, Spain
- Died: 1434

Alfonso Carrillo de Albornoz (died 1434) was a Roman Catholic cardinal.

Catholic Church titles
| Preceded by Baldassare Cossa | Cardinal-Deacon of Sant'Eustachio; 1408–1423 | Succeeded by Giacomo Isolani |
| Preceded by Pedro Fernández de Frías | Administrator of Osma; 1408–1434 | Succeeded by Juan de Cerezuela |
| Preceded by Pedro da Fonseca (cardinal) | Administrator of Sigüenza; 1422–1434 | Succeeded by |
| Preceded by Francesco Uguccione | Cardinal-Priest of Santi Quattro Coronati; 1423–1434 | Succeeded by Alfonso de Borja y Cabanilles |
