= Vuelta a Navarra =

Race details
- Date: May
- Region: Navarre
- English name: Tour of Navarre
- Discipline: Road race
- Competition: UCI Europe Tour (2005–2008)
- Type: Stage race
- Web site: vueltanavarra.com

History
- First edition: 1941
- Editions: 62 (as of 2025)
- First winner: Julián Berrendero (ESP)
- Most wins: Mariano Díaz (ESP) (3 wins)
- Most recent: Unai Ramos (ESP)

The Vuelta a Navarra is a road cycling stage race held annually since 1941 in the Autonomous community of Navarra, Spain. It was part of the UCI Europe Tour in category 2.2 from 2005 to 2008, and has been reserved for amateurs since 2009.

== Winners ==
Year	Country	Rider	Team
1941	Spain	Julián Berrendero	
1955	Spain	Antonio Jiménez Quiles	
1962	Spain	Antonio Blanco	
1963	Spain	Mariano Díaz	
1964	Spain	Mariano Díaz	
1965	Spain	Mariano Díaz	
1966	Spain	Juan Daniel Perera	
1967	Spain	José Antonio González	
1968	Spain	Josep Surià	
1969	Belgium	Lucien Van Impe	
1970	Spain	Andrés Oliva	
1971	Spain	José Viejo	
1972	Spain	Carlos Ocaña	
1973	Spain	Enrique Martínez Heredia	
1974	Spain	Santiago Segú	
1975	Spain	Eulalio García	
1976	No race		
1977	Spain	Anastasio Greciano	
1978	No race		
1979	Spain	Guillermo de la Peña	
1980	France	Francis Garmendia	
1981	Spain	Iñaki López Arregi	
1982	Brazil	Carlos Silvestre	
1983	Soviet Union	Oleg Petrovich Chuzhda	
1984	Spain	Álvaro Fernández Fernández	
1985	France	Jean-Claude Ronc	
1986	Spain	Carlos Muñiz	
1987	Brazil	Gabriel Sabbiao	
1988	Soviet Union	Dimitri Zhdanov	
1989	Spain	Francisco Ignacio San Román	
1990	Spain	Roberto Lezaun	
1991	Spain	Alfredo Irusta Sampedro	
1992	Spain	Agustín Sagasti	
1993	Spain	Óscar López Uriarte	
1994	Spain	Santiago Blanco	
1995	Russia	Sergei Ivanov	
1996	Spain	José Vicente García	
1997	Russia	Artur Babaicev	
1998	Russia	Eduard Gritsoun	
1999	Spain	Óscar García	
2000	Italy	Carmelo Maurici	
2001	Spain	Julen Fernández	
2002	Spain	Alberto Hierro	
2003	Spain	Santiago Segú Pombo	
2004	Russia	Alexei Bugrov	
2005	Russia	Pavel Brutt	
2006	Spain	Jesús Tendero	
2007	Italy	Maurizio Biondo	
2008	Colombia	Diego Tamayo	
2009	Spain	Francisco Terciado	
2010	Spain	Víctor de la Parte	
2011	France	Antoine Lavieu	
2012	Belgium	Steve Bekaert	
2013	Spain	Antonio Molina	
2014	Spain	Antonio Pedrero	
2015	Spain	Mikel Iturria	
2016	Ecuador	Richard Carapaz	
2017	Belgium	Harm Vanhoucke	
2018	Italy	Francesco Romano	
2019	Ecuador	Jefferson Alveiro Cepeda	
2020–2021	No race		
2022	United States	Andrew Vollmer	
2023	Spain	Hugo Aznar	
2024	Spain	Alex Díaz	
2025	Spain	Unai Ramos	
