= Juan de Cerezuela =

Spanish Catholic archbishop (died 1442)

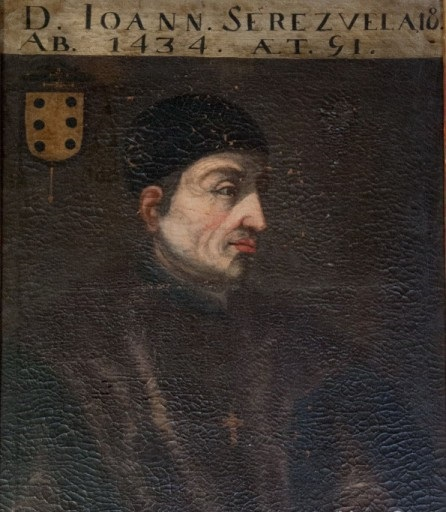
18th century painting of Juan de Cerezuela

Juan de Cerezuela (Cañete (Cuenca) – Talavera de la Reina, 1442) was a Spanish archbishop and the half-brother of Don Álvaro de Luna, the Great Constable of Castile, through his mother María Fernández de Jarana, known as La Cañeta.

== Biography ==
Thanks to the influence of his half-brother, the favorite of King John II of Castile, he obtained several episcopal sees, beginning with various benefices in the Diocese of Zaragoza, such as Cervera and Pancrudo in 1416. By 1422, he was already Abbot of Castrojeriz, when he was appointed Bishop of Osma.

In 1433, the king requested the Archbishopric of Seville for him, where he served for less than two years. In October 1434, he was elected Archbishop of Toledo upon the death of Juan Martínez Contreras, also thanks to the petition of the canons themselves, displacing Diego de Anaya and the two candidates nominated by the cathedral chapter, Ruy García de Villaquirán and Vasco Ramírez de Guzmán. He remained in office until his death in 1442, although he had strong conflicts with the chapter, even being deposed in 1441 before the Pope decreed his protection.

In support of his brother, he actively participated in military actions against the Infantes of Aragon, during the Castilian Civil War of 1437–1445 and others such as the Battle of La Higueruela and the actions at Medina del Campo in 1441.

He died the next year in Talavera de la Reina on 4 February 1442.

Catholic Church titles
Preceded by Alfonso Carrillo de Albornoz	Bishop of Osma; 1426–1432	Succeeded by Pedro de Castilla de Eril
Preceded by Lope de Olmedo	Archbishop of Seville; 1433–1434	Succeeded by Diego de Anaya Maldonado
Preceded by Juan Martínez de Contreras	Archbishop of Toledo; 1434–1442	Succeeded by Gutierre Álvarez de Toledo
