= Bonilla de la Sierra =

- municipality
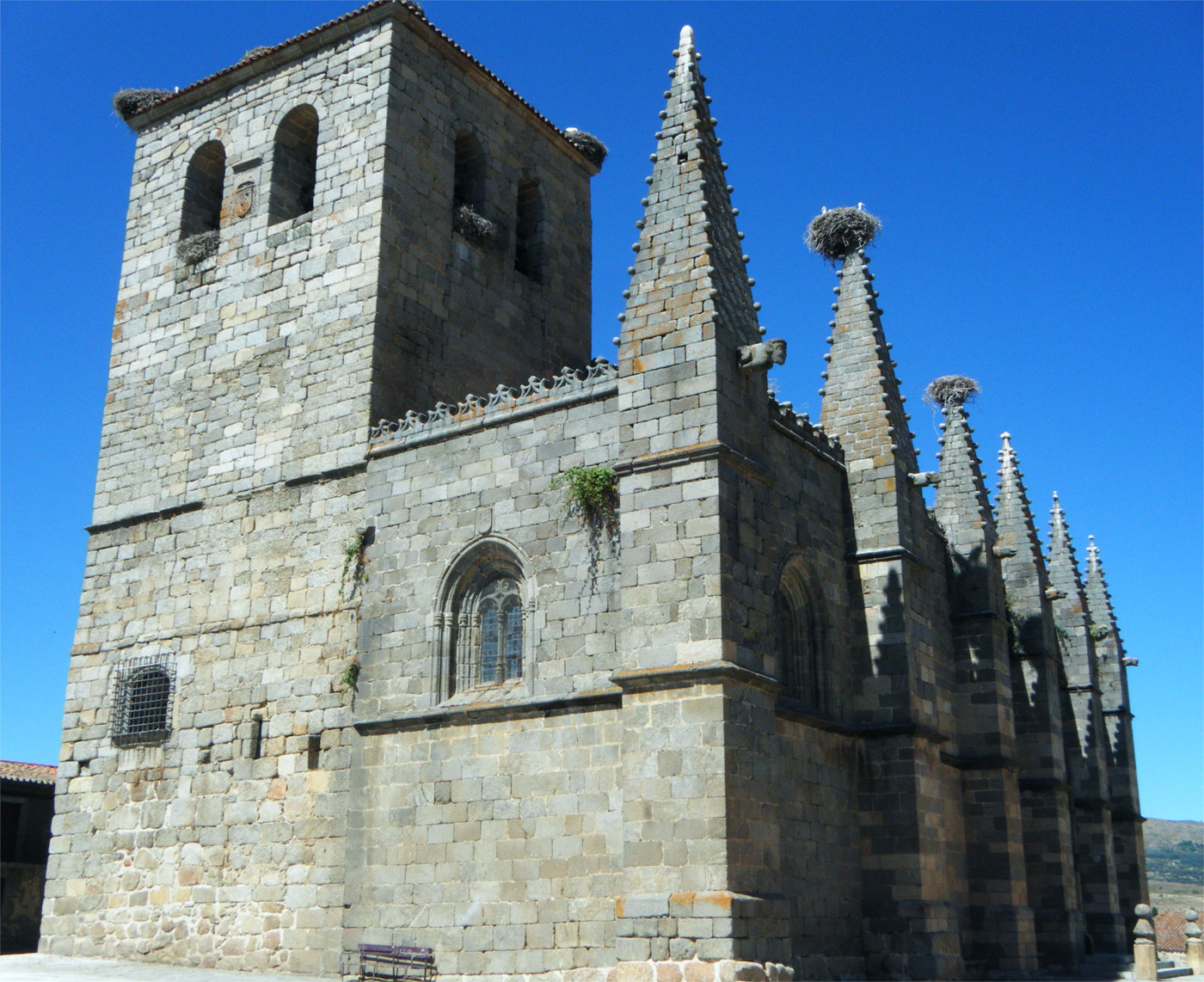
- Bonilla de la Sierra church

- Location in Spain. Bonilla de la Sierra (Spain)
- Coordinates: 40°31′44″N 5°15′51″W
- Country: Spain
- Autonomous community: Castile and León
- Province: Ávila
- Municipality: Bonilla de la Sierra

Area
  - Total: 55.06 km^{2} (21.26 sq mi)
- Elevation: 1,077 m (3,533 ft)

Population (2025-01-01)
  - Total: 139
  - Density: 2.52/km^{2} (6.54/sq mi)
- Time zone: UTC+1 (CET)
  - Summer (DST): UTC+2 (CEST)
- Website: Official website

Bonilla de la Sierra is a municipality located in the province of Ávila, Castile and León, Spain. According to a 2006 census (INE), the municipality had a population of 152 inhabitants in 2006, making it one of the lowest populations in Spain.

== Population ==
Historical population
Year	Pop.	±% p.a.
2023	180	—
2024	163	−9.44%
2025	139	−14.72%
Source: INE
