= Fuentidueña de Tajo =

- Municipality
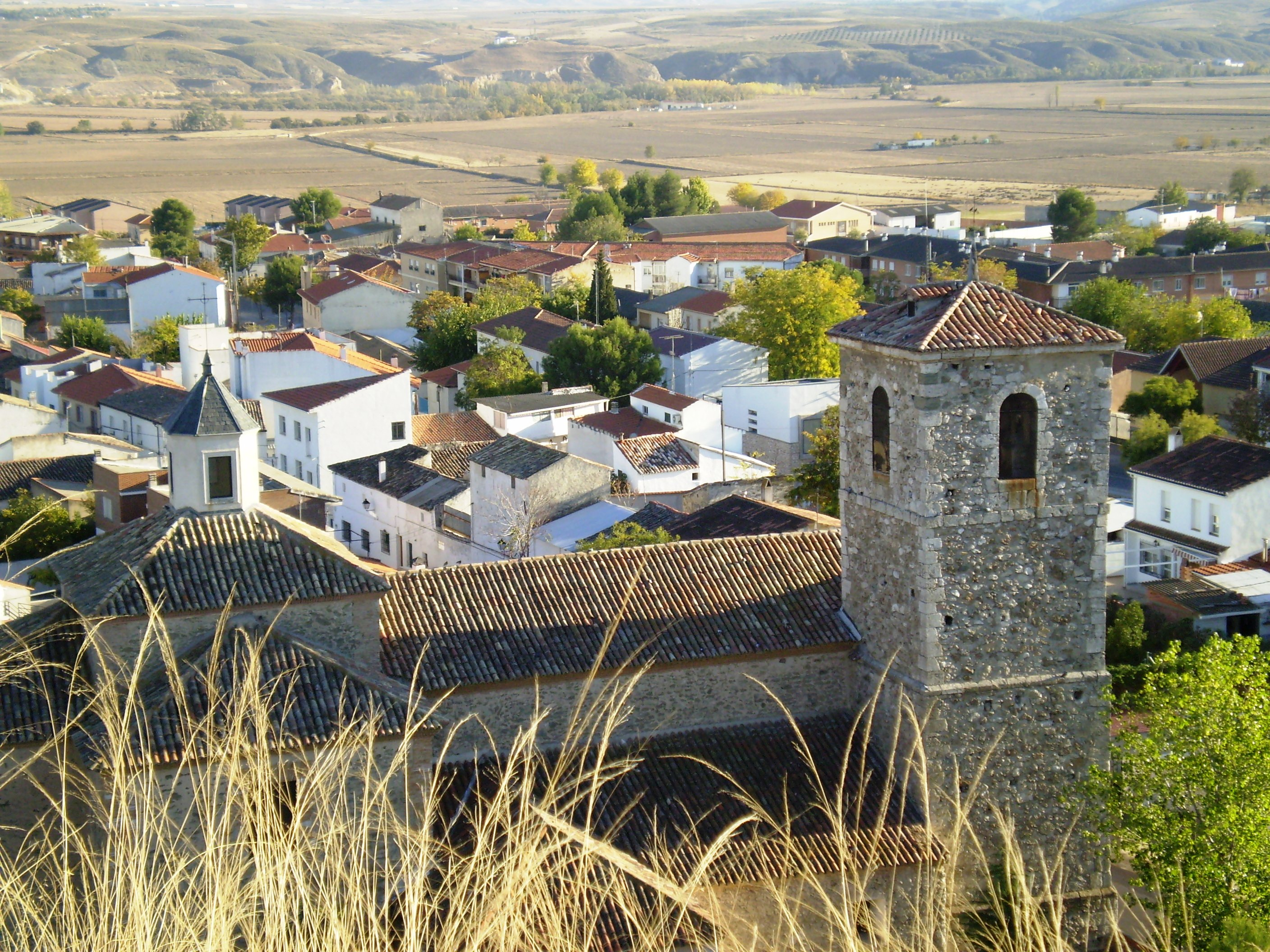
- View on Fuentidueña de Tajo

- Flag Coat of arms

- Location in Spain
- Coordinates: 40°7′5″N 3°9′37″W
- Country: Spain
- Autonomous community: Community of Madrid
- Province: Madrid
- Comarca: Las Vegas

Government
  - Mayor: Aurora Rodríguez Cabezas

Area
  - Total: 23.4 sq mi (60.6 km^{2})
- Elevation: 1,844 ft (562 m)

Population (2025-01-01)
  - Total: 2,372
  - Density: 101/sq mi (39.1/km^{2})
- Time zone: UTC+1 (CET)
  - Summer (DST): UTC+2 (CEST)
- Postal code: 28597
- Website: Official website

Fuentidueña de Tajo (Spanish pronunciation: [fwentiˈðweɲa ðe ˈtaxo]) is a municipality of the autonomous community of Madrid, central Spain. It belongs to the comarca of Las Vegas.

It was one of the settings for the 1937 movie The Spanish Earth.

== Main sights ==
- Torre del Reloj
- Torre de los Piquillos, one of the remains of the ancient Castle of Santiago
- Church of St. Andrew the Apostle, built has a chapel in 1175 and later expanded with a nave and two aisles. Its current appearance dates to the 17th century.
