= Henry IV of Castile =

King of Castile and León from 1454 to 1474

Henry IV
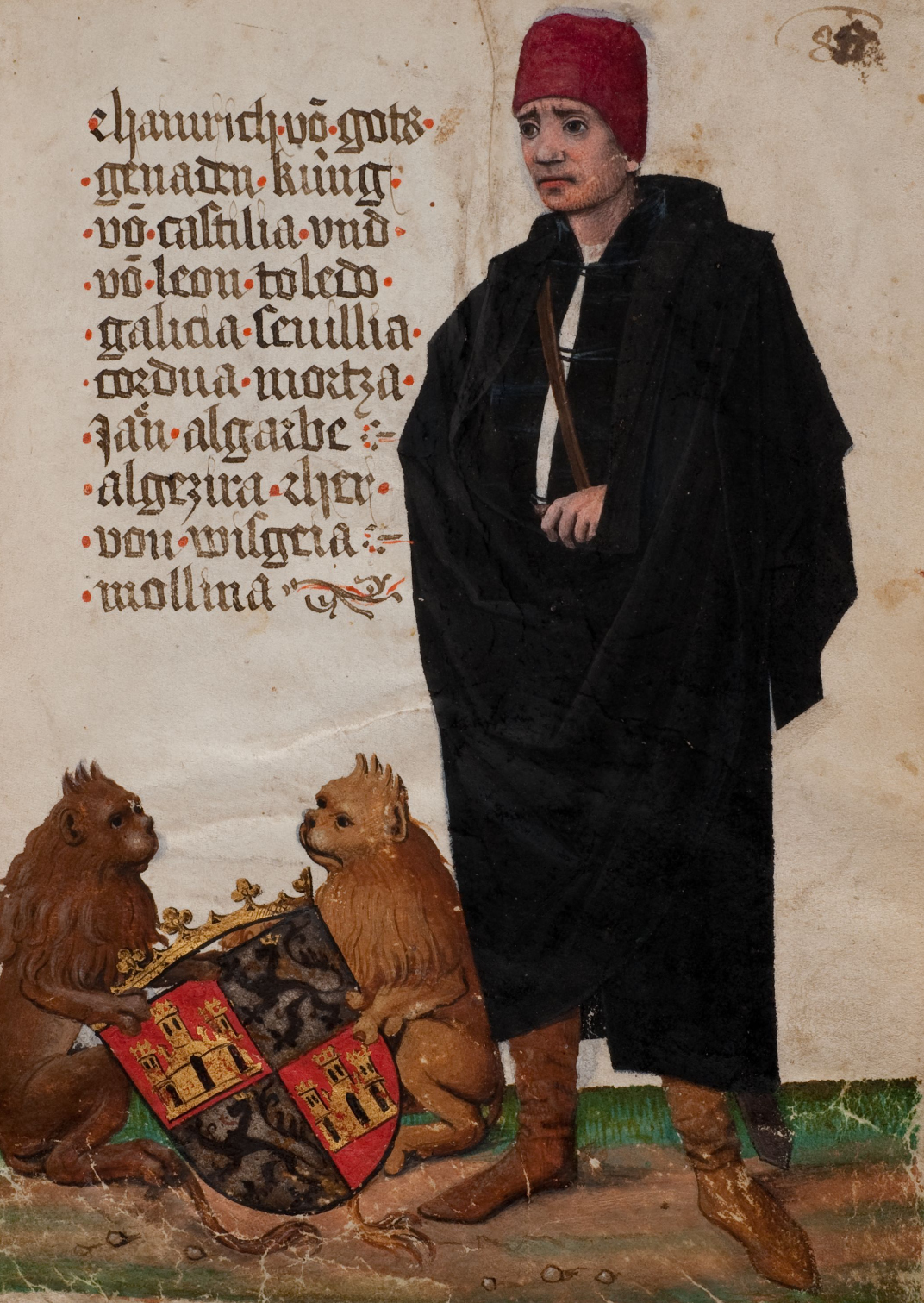
- Depiction in the 15th-century journal of Georg von Ehingen

King of Castile and León
- Reign: 22 July 1454 – 11 December 1474
- Predecessor: John II
- Successor: Isabella I
- Born: 5 January 1425; Valladolid, Spain
- Died: 11 December 1474 (aged 49); Madrid, Spain
- Burial: Santa María de Guadalupe
- Spouses: Blanche II of Navarre (m. 1440; ann. 1453) Joan of Portugal (m. 1455; ann. 1468)
- Issue: Joanna, Queen of Portugal
- House: Trastámara
- Father: John II of Castile
- Mother: Maria of Aragon

Henry IV (Castilian: Enrique IV; 5 January 1425 – 11 December 1474), nicknamed the Impotent, was King of Castile and León and the last of the weak late-medieval kings of Castile and León. During Henry's reign, the nobles became more powerful and the nation became less centralised.

== Early life ==
Henry was born in 1425 at the Casa de las Aldabas (since destroyed) in Teresa Gil street of Valladolid. He was the son of John II of Castile and Maria of Aragon. He displaced his older sister, Eleanor, and became heir apparent to the Castilian throne as the Prince of Asturias.

At the time of his birth, Castile was under control of Álvaro de Luna, who intended to select Henry's companions and direct his education. The companions of his own age included Juan Pacheco, who became his closest confidant. The struggles, reconciliations and intrigues for power among the aristocracy, Álvaro de Luna, and the Infantes of Aragon would be constant.

On 10 October 1444, he became the first and only prince of Jaén. In 1445 he won the First Battle of Olmedo, defeating the Infantes of Aragon. After the victory at Olmedo, Álvaro de Luna's power waned, and Prince Henry and Juan Pacheco's influence grew.

== Accession and rule ==
Henry IV's father died on 20 July 1454 and he was proclaimed king the following day.

One of King Henry's first priorities was the alliance with Portugal. He achieved this by marrying a second time to Joan of Portugal, daughter of King Edward of Portugal, in 1455; and by meeting her brother King Afonso V of Portugal in Elvas in 1456. His other main concerns were the possibility of intervention from King John II of Navarre, establishing peace with France and Aragon, and pardoning various aristocrats. Henry IV convened the Cuéllar Courts to launch an offensive against the Emirate of Granada. The campaigns of 1455 and 1458 developed into a war of attrition based on punitive raids and avoiding pitched battles. It was not popular with the aristocracy or the people. Juan Pacheco, the Marquis of Villena, and his brother Pedro Girón were put in charge of government decisions. King Henry also took other advisors, such as Beltrán de la Cueva, Miguel Lucas de Iranzo, and Gómez de Cáceres to balance against their influence.

In 1458, King Alfonso V of Aragon died and was succeeded by his brother, John II of Navarre. King John II resumed his interference in Castilian politics, supporting the aristocratic opposition to Juan Pacheco's ambitions. With the support of the King Henry, Pacheco moved to seize Álvaro de Luna's assets, but his widow allied herself with the Mendoza family, causing a division among the aristocracy. This process resulted in the formation of a League of Nobles in March 1460. They raised a large number of noblemen, took control of expenditure, and gained the acceptance of Alfonso of Castile, the King Henry's half-brother and Prince of Asturias.

To counteract King John II's politicking, Henry IV reacted by invading Navarre in support of Charles, Prince of Viana. Charles was the heir to Navarre, and he revolted against his father John II in 1450 when he refused to cede the throne of Navarre. The campaign was a military success, but King Henry made peace with the League of Nobles in August 1461 to ward off the power of the Mendozas, which had allowed John II to intervene in Castile.

King John II was in conflict with the Principality of Catalonia, and on the death of his eldest son, Charles of Viana, the principality elected Henry IV to be Count of Barcelona on 11 August 1462. King Henry's intervention was framed as a rivalry between him and John II, making Catalonia an unstable point in the Crown of Aragon. But he was unsuccessful, and the Castilian economy would suffer from an enmity with France, who had supported John II with the Treaty of Bayonne. Henry IV therefore agreed to a settlement in the Judgment of Bayonne, resulting in the abandonment of the Catalans.

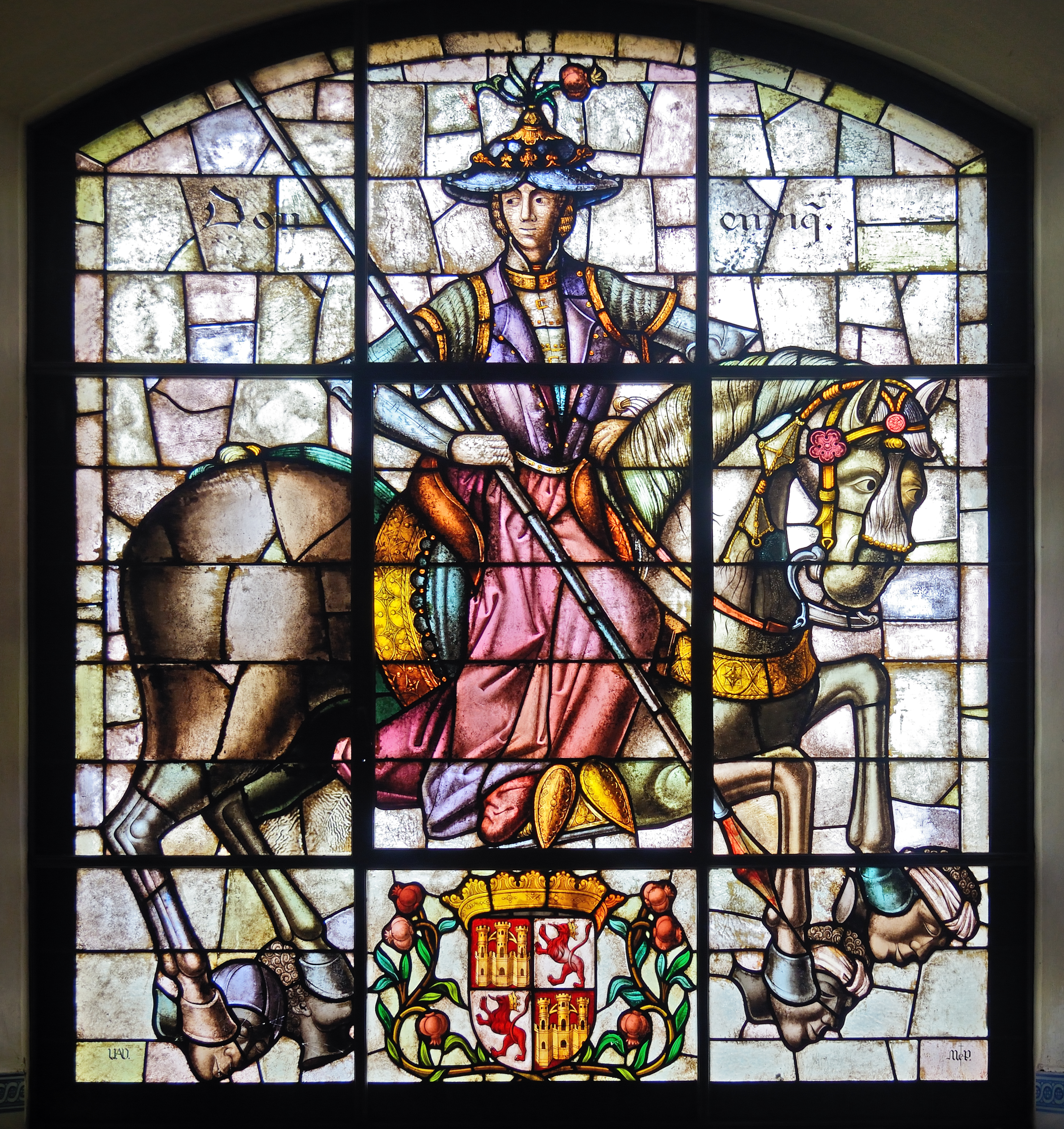
Stained glass "Don Enriq" in the Alcázar, Segovia

During his reign as king, Henry IV spent a lot of time at the Royal Alcázar of Madrid where he would stay for long periods of time. The Royal Alcazar was later replaced with the Royal Palace of Madrid by the rulers of Spain.

== Marriages ==
=== Blanche II of Navarre ===
Prince Henry celebrated his marriage to Blanche of Navarre in 1440, when he was 15 years old. The cardinal Juan de Cervantes presided over the official ceremony. Her parents were Blanche I of Navarre and John II of Navarre. The marriage had been agreed in 1436 as part of the peace negotiations between Castile and Navarre. The dowry included territories and villas that had previously belonged to Navarre but had been won by the Castilian side during the war, and the Castilians agreed to hand the lands back provided they would be given them back again as part of this dowry.

In May 1453, the bishop of Segovia Luis Vázquez de Acuña annulled the marriage of Henry and Blanche, on the grounds of Henry's sexual impotence due to a curse. This neatly reflected the recent political changes: Castile had supported Charles, Prince of Viana in his fight against John II of Aragon for the Navarrese throne since 1451, and Álvaro de Luna, Duke of Trujillo had been executed in May 1453, leaving Henry with greater control of Castile. Henry alleged that he had been incapable of sexually consummating the marriage, despite having tried for over three years, the minimum period required by the church. Other women, prostitutes from Segovia, testified that they had had sexual relations with Henry, which is why he blamed his inability to consummate the marriage on a spell. Henry's alleged "permanent impotence" only affected his relations with Blanche. Blanche and Henry were cousins, and he was also a cousin of Joan of Portugal, whom he wanted to marry instead. Therefore, the reason he used to seek the annulment was the sort of spell that only affected his ability to consummate this one marriage, and would not cause any problems for him with other women. Pope Nicholas V corroborated the decision in December of the same year in a papal bull and provided a papal dispensation for Henry's new marriage with the sister of the Portuguese king.

One of Henry's detractors, the historian Alfonso de Palencia, wrote that the marriage had been a sham and accused Henry of despising his wife and planning to commit adultery to bear children. According to Palencia, Henry demonstrated "most extreme abhorrence" to his wife, and indifference to the confines of marriage. However, in 1462 Blanche gave up her right to the Navarrese throne so Henry could take it, and selected him as her protector, against her own father John II of Aragon.

=== Joan of Portugal ===
The remoteness of Aragon led to an approach to Portugal. In March 1453, before his divorce from Blanche was finalised, there was no record of negotiations for the new marriage between Henry and Joan of Portugal, sister of the king Afonso V of Portugal. The first marital approaches were made in December of that year, although the negotiations were long and the proposal wasn't definitively agreed until February 1455. According to chroniclers of the time, Joan did not provide a dowry and would not have to return anything even if the marriage turned out to be a failure. The length of the negotiations and the concessions could be interpreted as caused by the concerns about the rumours of Henry's impotence. The wedding was celebrated in May 1455, but without an affidavit of official bull authorizing the wedding between them, although they were first cousins (their mothers were sisters) and half-second cousins (their paternal grandmothers were half-sisters). On 28 February 1462, the queen gave birth to a daughter Joanna la Beltraneja, whose paternity came into question during the conflict for succession to the Castilian throne when Henry died.

Henry IV was twenty-six years old when his half-sister Isabella was born. She was the daughter of his father's second marriage in 1447, to Isabella of Portugal. Henry made a number of attempts throughout his reign to arrange a politically advantageous marriage for his much younger sister. The first attempt was when the six-year-old Isabella was betrothed to Ferdinand, son of John II of Navarre (a cadet branch of the House of Trastámara). This arrangement, however, did not last long.

== Civil war ==
Before the birth of his daughter, Henry convened the Court in Madrid and Joanna was sworn in as Princess of Asturias. But a conflict with the nobility was created when Beltrán de la Cueva deposed Juan Pacheco, the Marquis of Villena, and his brother Pedro Girón, Master of Calatrava from Henry's court. This caused a change in alliances: Mendoza began to support the king, and Pacheco revived the Aristocratic League aimed at eliminating the influence of Beltrán de la Cueva. They had doubts about the paternity of Henry's daughter, saying that she was in fact the daughter of the new favourite, and started referring to her as "la Beltraneja". The league of nobles, controlling the king's siblings Alfonso and Isabella, forced Henry at the 1464 Representation of Burgos to repudiate Joanna and recognize Alfonso as his official heir. Alfonso then became Prince of Asturias, a title previously held by Joanna. Henry agreed to the compromise with the stipulation that Alfonso someday marry Joanna, to ensure that they both would one day receive the crown.

Not long after this, Henry reneged on his promise and began to support his daughter's claim once more. The nobles in league against him conducted a ceremonial deposition-in-effigy of Henry outside the city of Avila and crowned Alfonso as a rival king. This event is known in history as the Farce of Ávila. Shortly thereafter, Alfonso began handing out land and titles as if he were already uncontested ruler. A civil war began. The most notable clash was at the Second Battle of Olmedo in 1467, which concluded as a draw.

== Death ==
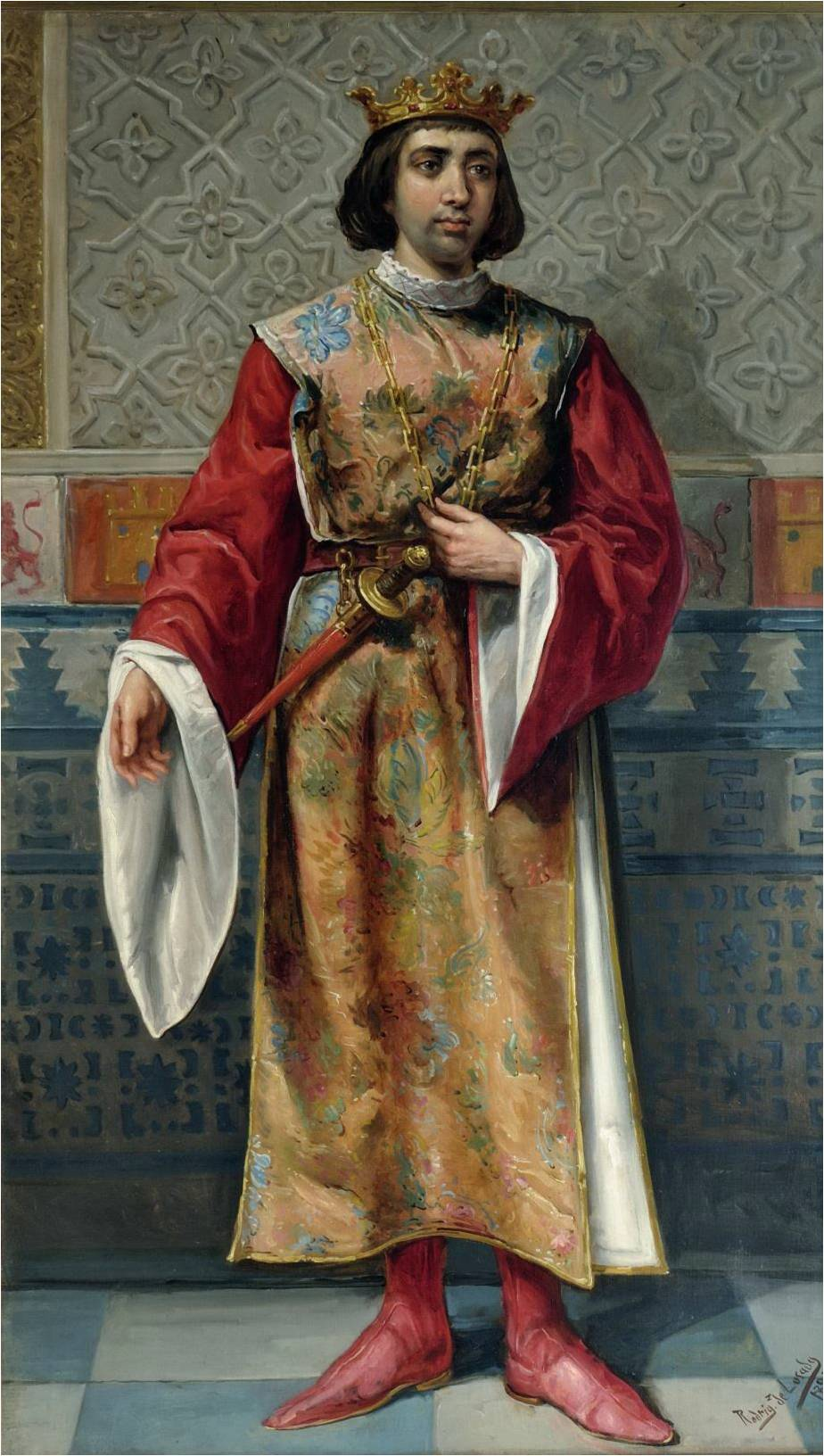
Artist's conception by Jose Maria Rodriguez de Losada, c. 1892–1894

However, in 1468, at the age of only 14, Alfonso died, most likely from the plague (although poison and slit throat have been suggested). His will left his crown to his sister, Isabella, who was asked to take her brother's place as the champion of the rebels. Shortly thereafter at the negotiation of Toros de Guisando, in which she and her allies received most of what they desired, Henry agreed to exclude Joanna la Beltraneja from the succession, and to recognize Isabella as his official heir. Though Henry continued to resist this decision when possible, his actions were ineffective, and he remained at peace with Isabella for the rest of his reign. Isabella became Castile's next monarch when he died in 1474.

After the death of the king, war broke out in Castile. Joanna was supported by Portugal, while the eventual winner, Henry's half-sister Isabella I of Castile, had the support of Aragon. France initially supported Joanna, yet in 1476, after losing the Battle of Toro, France refused to help Joanna further and in 1478 signed a peace treaty with Isabella.

== Debate over his health and sexuality ==
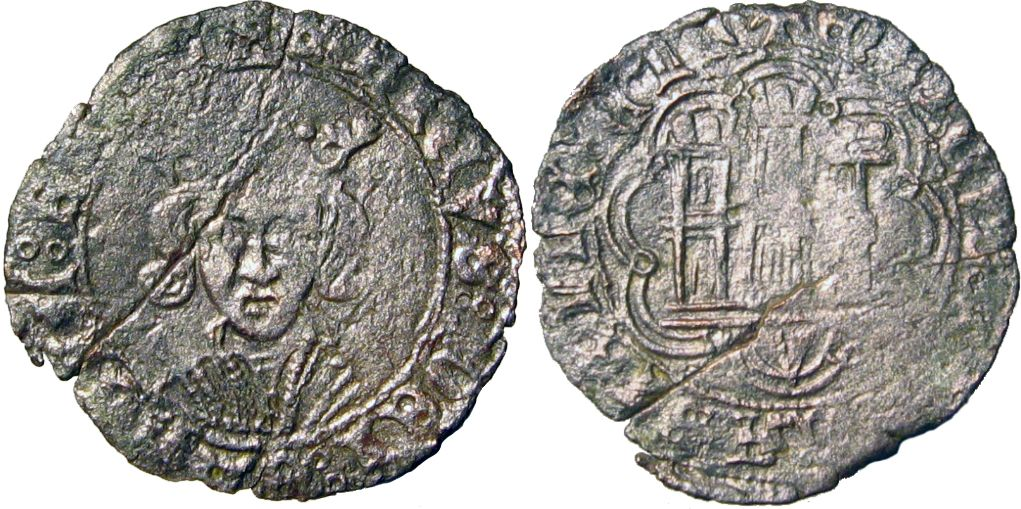
Henry IV cuartillo from the Villalón de Campos mint

In 1440, at the age of fifteen, he was married to Blanche II of Navarre. The marriage was never consummated. In 1453, after thirteen years, Henry sought an annulment. An official examination confirmed the virginity of Blanche, and a priest questioned the prostitutes of Segovia, who confirmed that Henry was sexually capable. Blanche was sent home; eight years later, she became de jure Queen of Navarre and died under strange circumstances.

In 1455, Henry married Joan of Portugal, sister of Afonso V of Portugal. After six years of marriage, in 1462, she gave birth to a daughter, Joanna, nicknamed "la Beltraneja". Six years after the birth of the throne's heir, part of the nobility of Castile revolted against the king. The rebels claimed that the princess was not the daughter of the king, but actually the daughter of Beltrán de La Cueva, 1st Duke of Alburquerque (thus the nickname "Beltraneja"). This hypothesis was reinforced when the Queen had another two children with the nephew of a bishop. Though many contemporary historians and chroniclers believed Henry was impotent or homosexual, the royal chronicles of his reign were all written or revised during the reign (and under the influence) of Isabella I, his half-sister and ultimate successor, whose strong interest in proving Joanna illegitimate renders these accounts at least partially suspect, in addition to the fact that female prostitutes testified to having intercourse with Henry. The question of Joanna's paternity and right to the throne is therefore not firmly answerable, given the lack of available reliable sources.

The doubt of her legitimacy as an heir, the weakness of the king, the adultery of the queen, and the unruliness of the nobility all set the stage for a struggle for succession after Henry's death. Henry divorced his wife after her scandalous behavior with Bishop Fonseca's nephew. After a long period of conflict between the rival factions, Henry finally agreed to name Isabella his successor, in Guisando (Ávila), provided she allow him to arrange her strategic marriage. Isabella would go on to break this stipulation of the agreement.

Henry died in 1474 and was buried at Santa María de Guadalupe, next to his mother.

== Appearance and character ==
Henry was a kindly, shy and cultured man with a penchant for tragic ballads. A gifted singer and musician, collector of exotic animals and a superb horseman, he was temperamentally unsuited to the public role of a king. There was nothing he liked more than to hide himself away with his animals or lose himself deep inside a thick forest, accompanied by his loyal personal guard of mudéjar Muslims. A childhood accident had left him with a deformed nose, squashed flat on to his face, but he was tall, athletic and blue-eyed with a bushy beard and fair hair. To his admirers this made him look like a fierce lion. To his enemies he looked 'like a monkey'. Henry suffered a form of acromegaly or gigantism, which left him with outsized hands and feet along with an abnormally large head and thick facial features. His massive forehead stood above strangely staring eyes and wide, strong cheeks that flattened out as they descended into a long, unwieldy jaw. He was a king with no airs and limited self-esteem, who rejected the daily trappings of royalty. 'He never allowed people to kiss his hand, and made little of himself...He dressed simply, in woollen cloth, with long tunics and hooded cloaks: royal insignias and ceremony were not to his taste,' said Diego Enríquez del Castillo, his admiring official chronicler.

== See also ==
- Castilian Civil War of 1437–1445

Henry IV of Castile House of Trastámara Born: 5 January 1425 Died: 11 December 1474
Regnal titles
Preceded by John II	King of Castile and León; 1454–1474	Succeeded by Isabella I
Spanish royalty
Preceded by Infanta Eleanor	Prince of Asturias; 1425–1454	Vacant Title next held by Infanta Joanna
Titles in pretence
Preceded by John II	— TITULAR — King of Aragon; Count of Barcelona (in opposition to John II); 1462–1463	Succeeded by Peter V
