= Roman Catholic Archdiocese of Hyaguata =

The Roman Catholic Archdiocese of Hyaguata was a short-lived (1504–1511) Antillian Catholic archbishopric with see at/about present Santo Domingo.

== History ==
It was established on 15 November 1504, by the Papal Bull Illius fulciti issued by Pope Julius II, as Metropolitan Archdiocese of Hyaguata, one of the first bishoprics in the New World, on Spanish-colonial territory formally split off canonically from the Archdiocese of Sevilla, to take over its position as Metropolitan on the island Hispaniola (Greater Antilles), with two suffragans, both created at that time : the Diocese of Magua (located at Concepción de La Vega) and the Diocese of Bayuna (located at Lares de Guahaba), also in the present Dominican Republic, which would both follow its fate, as the erection was never executed, due to the royal objection of Ferdinand II of Aragon, who opposed that the Bull gave the dioceses the right to receive a portion of the earnings from the gold and precious stones discovered in the territory.

It was suppressed on 8 August 1511 by the same Pope Julius II's Papal Bull Pontifax Romanus which extinguished the previously granted ecclesiastical province and its dioceses and reassigned their delegated bishops. It had a single incumbent, who was transferred to the newly erected Roman Catholic Diocese of Concepción de la Vega (later merged into Santiago de Cuba, re-erected, now La Vega). Although it had no formal successor, its place would be taken be the Roman Catholic Diocese of Santo Domingo (later promoted to Metropolitan).

== Episcopal Ordinary ==
Metropolitan Archbishop of Hyaguata

- Archbishop-elect Pedro Suárez de Deza, (Spaniard?) (1504.11.15 – 1511.08.08, not consecrated or possessed), next first Bishop of Concepción de la Vega (Dominican Republic) (1511.08.13 – death 1523.03.17).

== See also ==
- List of Catholic dioceses in the Dominican Republic

== Sources and external links ==
- GCatholic - data for all sections
