= Diego de Deza =

Grand Inquisitor of Spain (1444–1523)

His Excellency Diego de Deza OP
- Archbishop of Seville; Grand Inquisitor of Spain
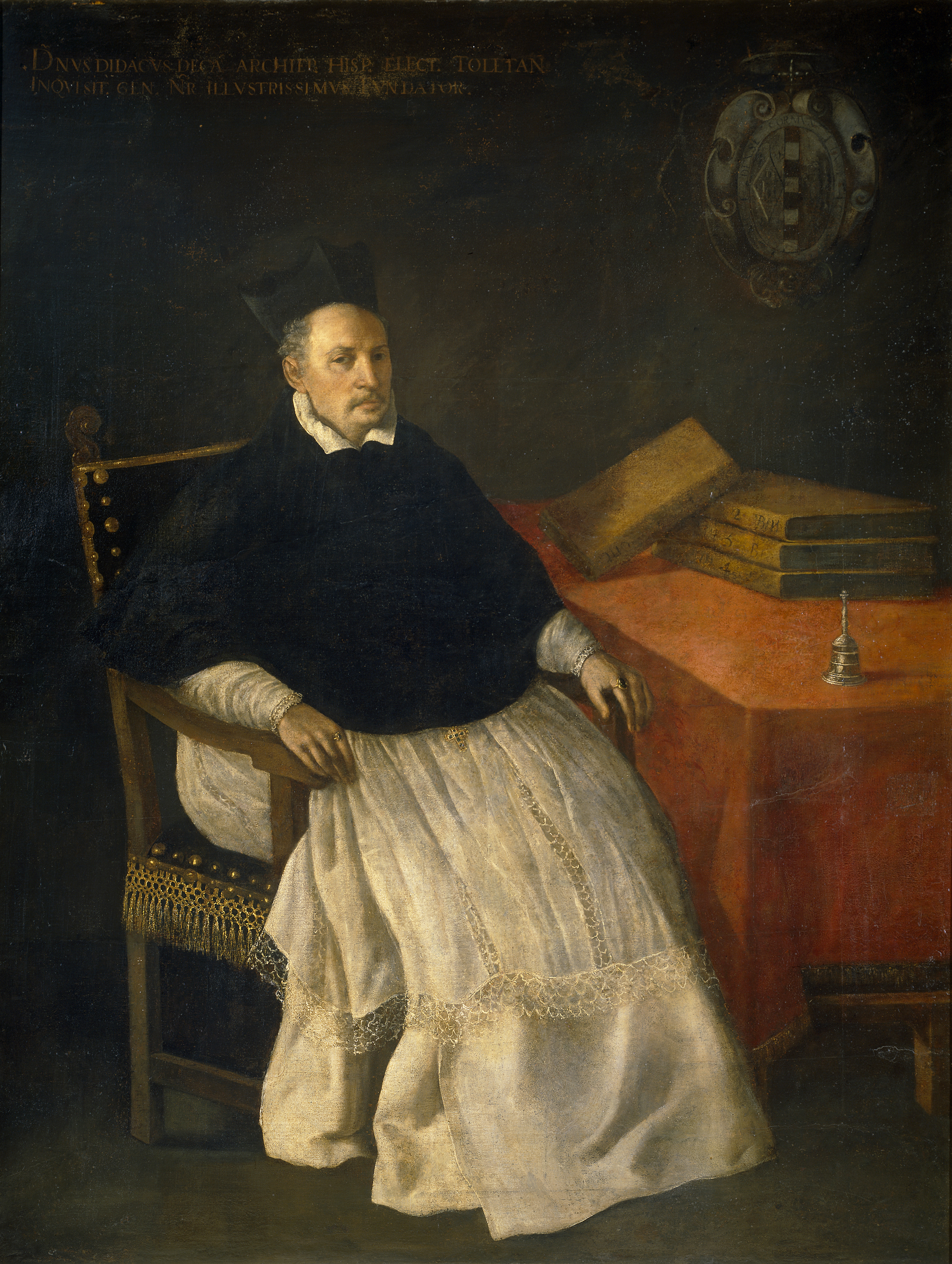
- Diego de Deza (c. 1631) by Zurbarán, Museo del Prado
- Church: Catholic Church
- Archdiocese: Seville
- Appointed: 30 October 1504
- Term ended: 9 June 1523
- Predecessor: Juan de Zúñiga y Pimentel
- Successor: Gutierre Álvarez de Toledo
- Previous posts: Bishop of Salamanca (1494-1498); Bishop of Jaén (1498-1500); Grand Inquisitor of Spain (1499-1506); Bishop of Palencia (1500-1504)

Personal details
- Born: 1444 Toro, Zamora, Spain
- Died: 9 June 1523 (aged 78–79) Seville, Spain
- Education: University of Salamanca

Diego de Deza y Tavera (1444 – 9 June 1523) was a theologian and inquisitor of Spain. He was one of the more notable figures in the Spanish Inquisition, and succeeded Tomás de Torquemada to the post of Grand Inquisitor.

== Early life ==
Deza was born in Toro, Zamora and entered the Dominican Order at a young age. He held a number of ecclesiastical posts, and also tutored Prince Juan de Aragón y Castilla, also known as John, Prince of Asturias, the only surviving son of King Ferdinand and Queen Isabella.

He was fundamental in granting navigator Christopher Columbus access to Queen Isabella and King Ferdinand.

After first serving as Bishop of Zamora (1487–1494), Bishop of Salamanca (1494–1498), Bishop of Jaén (1498–1500), and Bishop of Palencia (February 1500 – 1504), he became Archbishop of Seville in 1505. Deza was commissioned as Grand Inquisitor for Castile, León, and Granada on 24 November 1498. On 1 September of the following year, his authority was expanded to cover the whole of Spain.

== The Inquisition ==
Deza was the successor to Tomás de Torquemada, perhaps the most famous of all inquisitors. Like Torquemada, Deza had a particular dislike of conversos – Jews or Muslims who had converted to Christianity but who were often accused of secretly retaining their original faith.

It is reported that shortly after his arrival to Palencia, he managed, on 25 April 1500, to baptize all the "moriscos" established there. As the 25 April was St Mark's day according to the calendar, the then-named "Morería" street has since been known as "San Marcos" street. He was commissioned as Archbishop of Seville on 30 October 1504. But, after the death a few days later of Queen Isabella I of Castile, he had to attend urgent meetings with the other two attorneys of the dead queen, King Consort Ferdinand II of Aragon and Cardinal Francisco Ximenez de Cisneros.

Arriving in Seville in October 1505, just one year after his appointment, Deza prepared to perform the same conversions to Christianity as he had "achieved" five years earlier in Palencia. With the help of Martín de Ullate, "numerous" Sevillian Muslims and Jews were thus converted no later than the end of 1505. He also held the inquisitorial enquiries on the new Archbishopric of Granada, conquered in 1492 with truces about respecting the private religious beliefs of Granada Muslims soon to be ignored.

Like Torquemada, Deza was accused of being overzealous in his work, and of showing excessive cruelty – his reputation was sufficient that in 1507, the Pope was forced to publicly request moderation. Accusations were also made that Deza used his position to enrich himself, confiscating the wealth of accused heretics for himself. A complaint about Deza, made to the royal secretary by Captain Gonzalo de Ayora (Ayora being a valuable Valencia town with numerous "moriscos" since before the 13th century), said that Deza and his lieutenants "have no regard either for God or for justice; they kill, steal, and dishonor girls and women to the disgrace of the Christian religion."

Following the death of Inquisitor-General Tomás de Torquemada in 1498, King Ferdinand II of Aragon and Queen Isabella I of Castile nominated Diego de Deza, a Dominican friar, to succeed him. Their proposal was submitted to Pope Alexander VI, who approved Deza's appointment as Inquisitor-General of Spain. At the time, Deza held the position of Bishop of Jaén, a role he had occupied since 1494, and he later advanced to become the Archbishop of Seville in 1504, further solidifying his influence in both ecclesiastical and inquisitorial spheres.

During his tenure, Deza advocated for the expansion of the Spanish Inquisition's authority into the Kingdom of Granada, despite prior assurances to the baptized Moors that they would be exempt from such scrutiny. Queen Isabella initially resisted this proposal but ultimately agreed to a modified arrangement. This compromise extended the jurisdiction of the Cordova tribunal's inquisitors over Granada, limiting their prosecutions to clear cases of apostasy. From this period onward, the baptized Moors, who faced increasing pressure from the Inquisition, became widely known in historical records as Moriscos.

Deza served as Inquisitor-General for eight years, from 1498 to 1506. According to historical inscriptions recorded in Seville, during his administration, the Inquisition punished 38,440 individuals. Of these, 2,592 were executed by burning at the stake, 896 were condemned in effigy, and 34,952 were subjected to various lesser penalties, such as public penances or imprisonment. Among those targeted were numerous individuals distinguished by their noble birth, scholarly achievements, wealth, or high-ranking positions, reflecting the broad reach and severe impact of the Inquisition under Deza's leadership.

== Downfall ==
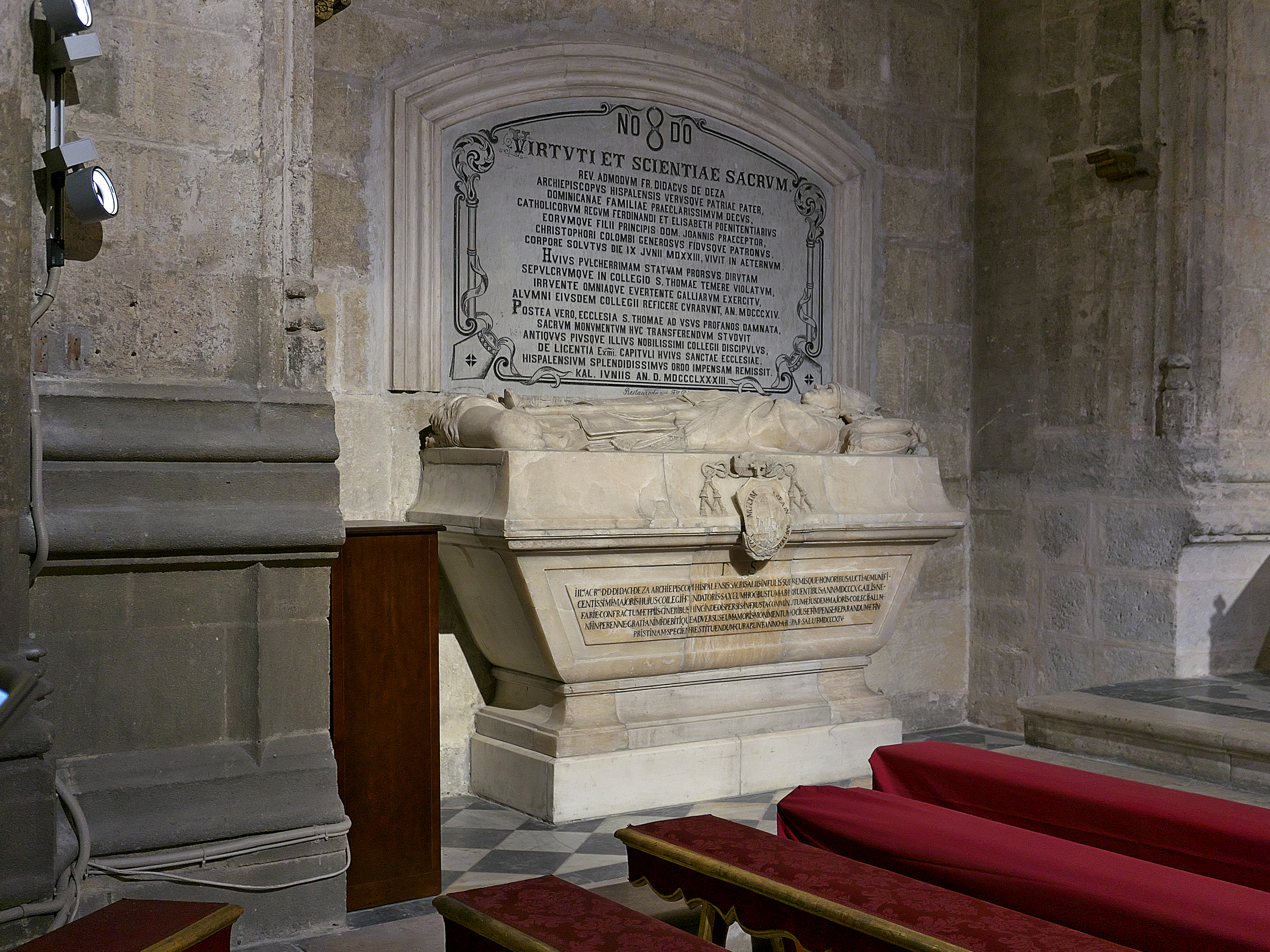
Diego de Deza's Funerary monument in Seville Cathedral

Deza himself was later accused of secretly practising Judaism, a charge mainly based on the fact that he himself had Jewish blood on his mother's side. The accusation was probably political, but nevertheless damaged his standing somewhat. His position was further undermined by several open insurrections against the Inquisition, particularly against his chief lieutenant Diego Rodriguez Lucero. Lucero intensely disliked the "false converted", and in 1500 handled papers sent to Pope Julius II on the Archbishop of Granada's (Hernando de Talavera) Jewish ancestry.

Lucero, the Inquisitor of Córdoba, was more hated than Deza, and in late 1506, had narrowly escaped with his life when an angry mob stormed the Inquisition's base in Cordoba and freed all its prisoners. Pope Julius II seems to have had a moderating influence on Deza and Lucero's researches.

After King Ferdinand II of Aragon remarried, he decided that Deza had become a liability, and Deza was forced to resign in 1507. Hernando de Talavera would die also in 1507 without knowing the whereabouts of his process in Rome.

In 1517 Diego de Deza founded in Seville the "Colegio de Santo Tomás", 15 years after Rodrigo Fernández de Santaella, who had founded the Colegio de Santa María de Jesus, initial nucleus of the modern University of Seville.

== Death ==
It is likely that Diego de Deza could have returned to his inquisitorial office, because it is known that he was named Archbishop of Toledo (and thus Primate of Spain), but was not able to take up the position due to illness. He died on 9 June 1523.

His tomb in his College of Santo Tomas was opened by Napoleonic troops in 1810 with the aim of stealing his rings, collars and golden paraphernalia. The college, later a Spanish Government military establishment within the Seville Regiments, being visited frequently by the wife of a High Military local boss, aroused an interest in the empty tombstone sarcophagus. She thought it would be useful to set up a bath to look after her beauty.

== Episcopal success ==
While bishop, he was the principal consecrator of:

- Alonso Manso, Bishop of Puerto Rico (1512);
- Pedro Suárez de Deza, Bishop of Concepción de la Vega (1512);
- Juan de Quevedo Villegas, Bishop of Santa María de La Antigua del Darién (1514);

and the principal co-consecrator of:

- Pascual Rebenga de Ampudia, Bishop of Burgos (1497).

== Bibliography ==
- Barquilla, José Barrado. "Diego de Deza y Tavera". Real Academia de la Historia.

Catholic Church titles
Preceded by Tomás de Torquemada	Grand Inquisitor of Spain; 1499–1506	Succeeded by Diego Ramírez de Guzmán
