= Rodrigo de Ávila =

Most Reverend Rodrigo de Ávila
- Bishop of Plasencia
- Church: Catholic Church
- In office: 1470–1492
- Predecessor: Juan Carvajal (cardinal)
- Successor: Gutierre Álvarez de Toledo

Personal details
- Died: February 1492 Plasencia, Spain

Rodrigo de Ávila (died February 1492) was a Roman Catholic prelate who served as Bishop of Plasencia (1470–1492).

== Biography ==
On 29 January 1470, Rodrigo de Ávila was appointed during the papacy of Pope Paul II as Bishop of Plasencia. He served as Bishop of Plasencia until his death in February 1492.

== See also ==
- Catholic Church in Spain

== External links and additional sources ==
- Cheney, David M. "Diocese of Plasencia". Catholic-Hierarchy.org. (for Chronology of Bishops) ^{[self-published]}
- Chow, Gabriel. "Diocese of Plasencia (Spain)". GCatholic.org. (for Chronology of Bishops) ^{[self-published]}

Catholic Church titles
Preceded by Juan Carvajal (cardinal)	Bishop of Plasencia; 1470–1492	Succeeded by Gutierre Álvarez de Toledo
