= Gutierre Álvarez de Toledo =

The Most Reverend Gutierre Álvarez de Toledo
- Bishop of Plasencia
- Church: Catholic Church
- In office: 1496–1506
- Predecessor: Rodrigo de Ávila
- Successor: Gómez de Toledo Solís

Gutierre Álvarez de Toledo was a Roman Catholic prelate who served as Bishop of Plasencia (1496–1506). He was also appointed as Archbishop of Seville in 1506, but it is unlikely that he ever took possession of the see.

== Life and career ==
He was the second son of García Álvarez de Toledo, 1st Duke of Alba. On 27 June 1496, Gutierre Álvarez de Toledo was appointed during the papacy of Pope Alexander VI as Bishop of Plasencia. On 28 August 1506, he was appointed during the papacy of Pope Julius II as Archbishop of Seville. It is unlikely that he ever took possession of the archdiocese, as the incumbent Diego de Deza is listed as serving from 1504 to 1523.

== External links and additional sources ==
- Cheney, David M. "Diocese of Plasencia". Catholic-Hierarchy.org. (for Chronology of Bishops) ^{[self-published]}
- Chow, Gabriel. "Diocese of Plasencia (Spain)". GCatholic.org. (for Chronology of Bishops) ^{[self-published]}
- Cheney, David M. "Archdiocese of Sevilla {Seville}". Catholic-Hierarchy.org. (for Chronology of Bishops) ^{[self-published]}
- Chow, Gabriel. "Metropolitan Archdiocese of Sevilla (Italy)". GCatholic.org. (for Chronology of Bishops) ^{[self-published]}

Catholic Church titles
Preceded by Rodrigo de Ávila	Bishop of Plasencia; 1496–1506	Succeeded by Gómez de Toledo Solís
