= History of Plasencia =

Municipality in Cáceres, Extremadura, Spain

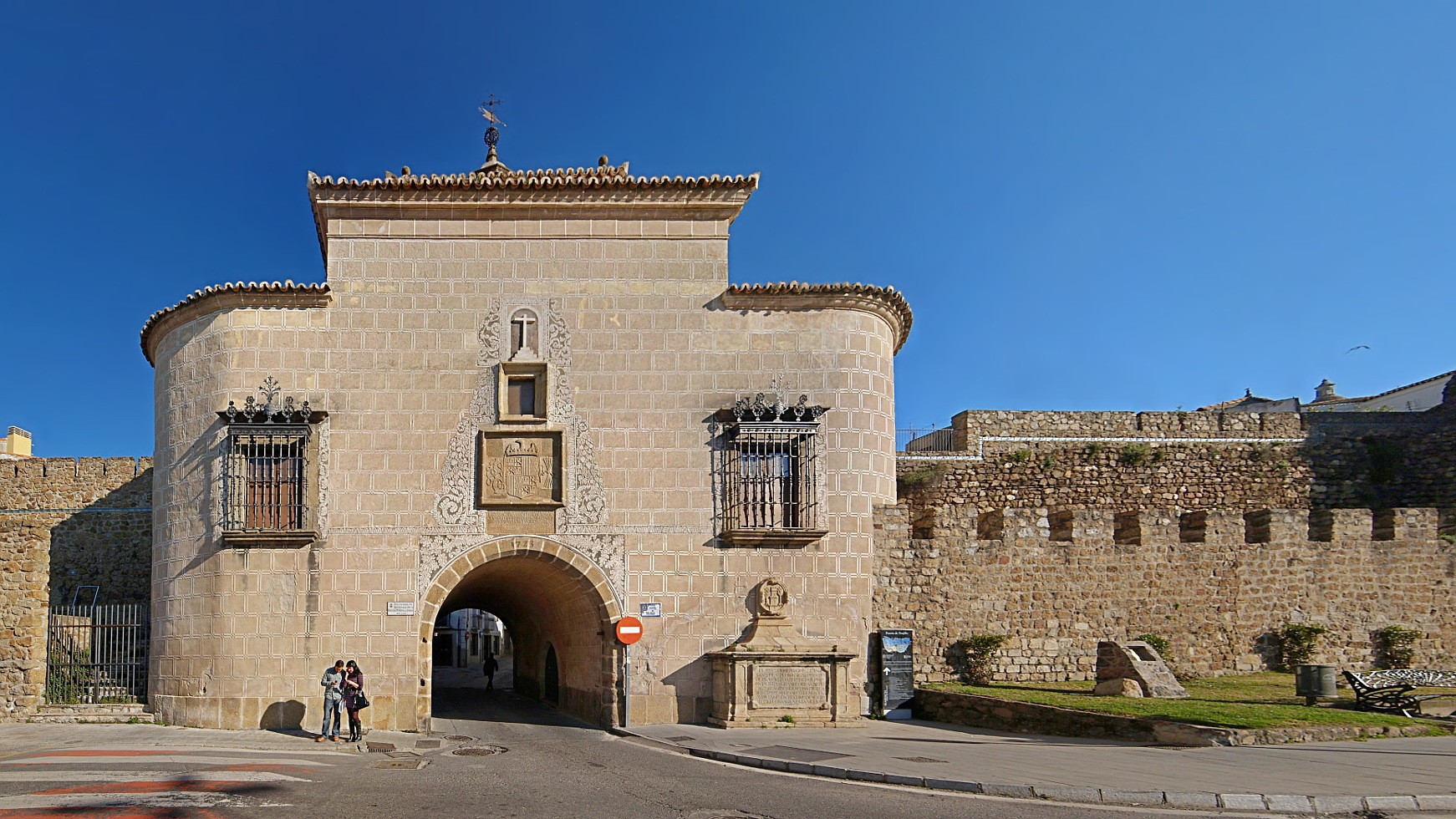
Trujillo Gate, one of the seven main gates in the medieval walls of Plasencia

Location of Plasencia in Spain

The history of Plasencia, a municipality of Spain in the province of Cáceres, an autonomous community of Extremadura, began in 1186 when King Alfonso VIII of Castile founded the city following the conquest of the area from the Almohad Caliphate. However, there are several indications of occupation of the area since prehistoric times. Various peoples frequented and inhabited the region until the arrival of the Romans, whose legions set up a military camp there. At the time of the Alandalus (Islamic occupation of the Iberian Peninsula), there would have been a Kasbah on the site where the city stands today.

The city prospered between the 12th and 17th centuries, reaching its apogee in the 16th century, as attested by its historic center and the various civil, military, and religious buildings. From the end of the 17th century on, the city went into decline, from which it would only recover in the second half of the 20th century.

== Prehistory and Antiquity ==
In the vicinity of Plasencia, there is an archaeological site from the Neolithic or Bronze Age: the Cave of Boquique ("Cueva de Boquique" in Spanish), which, in addition to traces of habitation, has a necropolis. The cave gave its name to a type of prehistoric pottery from the Iberian Peninsula and the Balearic Islands, the Boquique Pottery ("Cerámica de Boquique").

Its location on the Via de la Plata, an ancestral route linking the Iberian south and north, whose existence is supposed to date back at least to the Tartessos period (10th to 6th centuries BC), at a crossing point in the mountains of the Central System (the Jerte Valley), contributed to the city being frequented and inhabited by various pre-Roman peoples, such as the Celts, Vettones and Vaccaei, among others. This is evidenced, for example, by the remains of a hilfort near what is now the city. During the Roman Empire there was a military camp of the Roman legions, connected to the Vía de la Plata, then transformed into a Roman road.

== Middle Ages ==
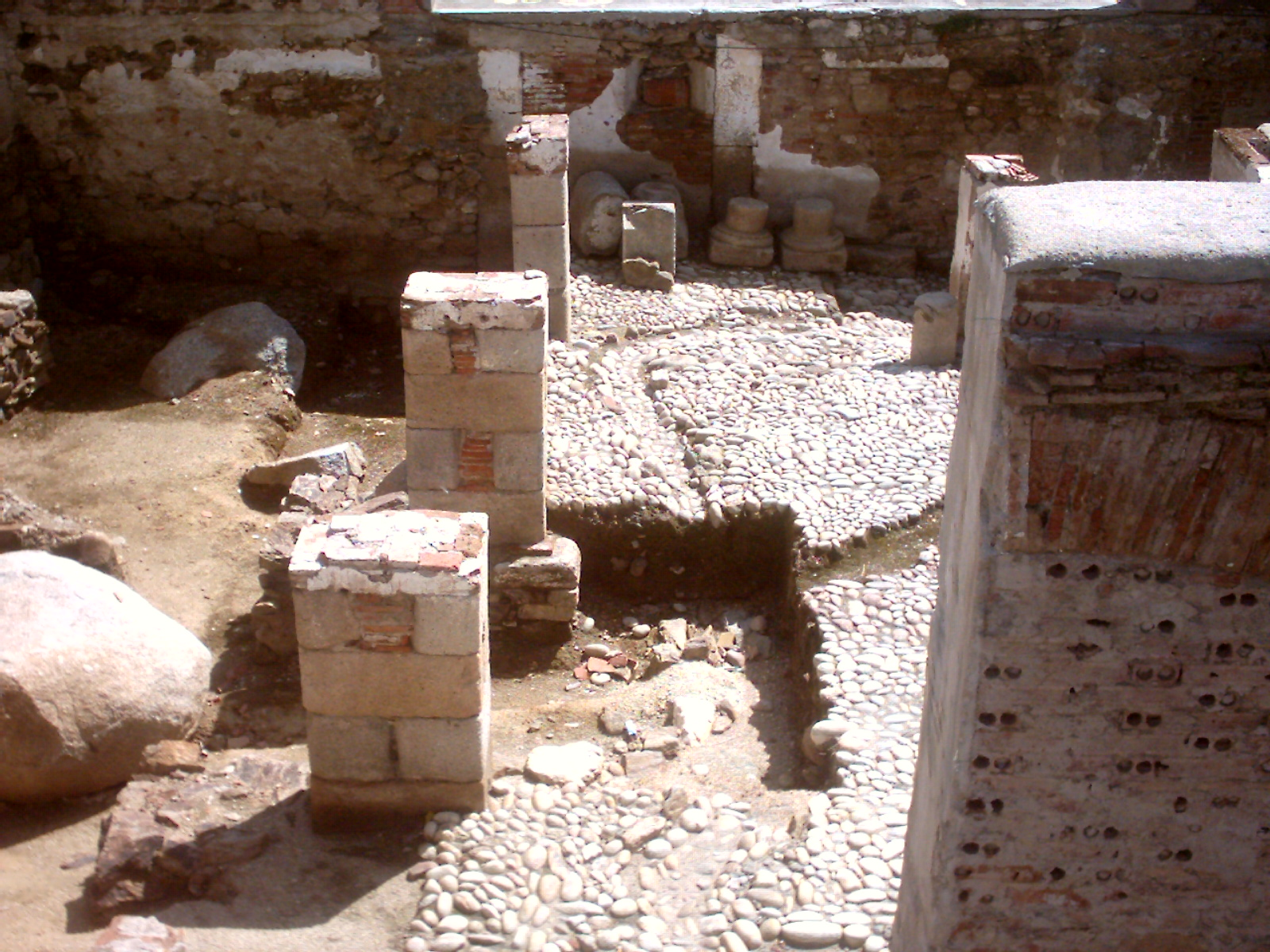
Hermitage of São Tomé, an old medieval mosque

=== Muslim Period and Christian Reconquest ===
During the Muslim period, it was likely that a Kasbah (castle) existed on the site where the city stands today.

The area was conquered in 1186 by Alfonso VIII of Castile, who founded the present city, the Muy Noble, Leal y Benéfica Ciudad de Plasencia, with the motto "Ut placeat Deo et Hominibus", which in Latin means "So that it pleases God and Men". That same year, the construction of the defensive wall began. Conceived from the beginning as a fortress, even today a pronounced military character can be seen in the old part of the city, which is structured around the Plaza Mayor, from which streets lead to the city gates. Merchants and artificers grouped themselves by branches of activity, each occupying a street or part of it.

The creation of the city was part of a strategy of the Castilian king to strengthen the Tagus line, creating a base to support the Reconquista of the southern Iberian Peninsula and restrict the expansion of the Kingdom of León west of the Vía de la Plata, in military, political, and ecclesiastical terms. As the region was relatively close to Toledo, then the capital of Castile, the inclusion of the area in the archdiocese of Toledo would translate into less influence from León, which was avoided by including Plasencia in the archdiocese of Santiago de Compostela.

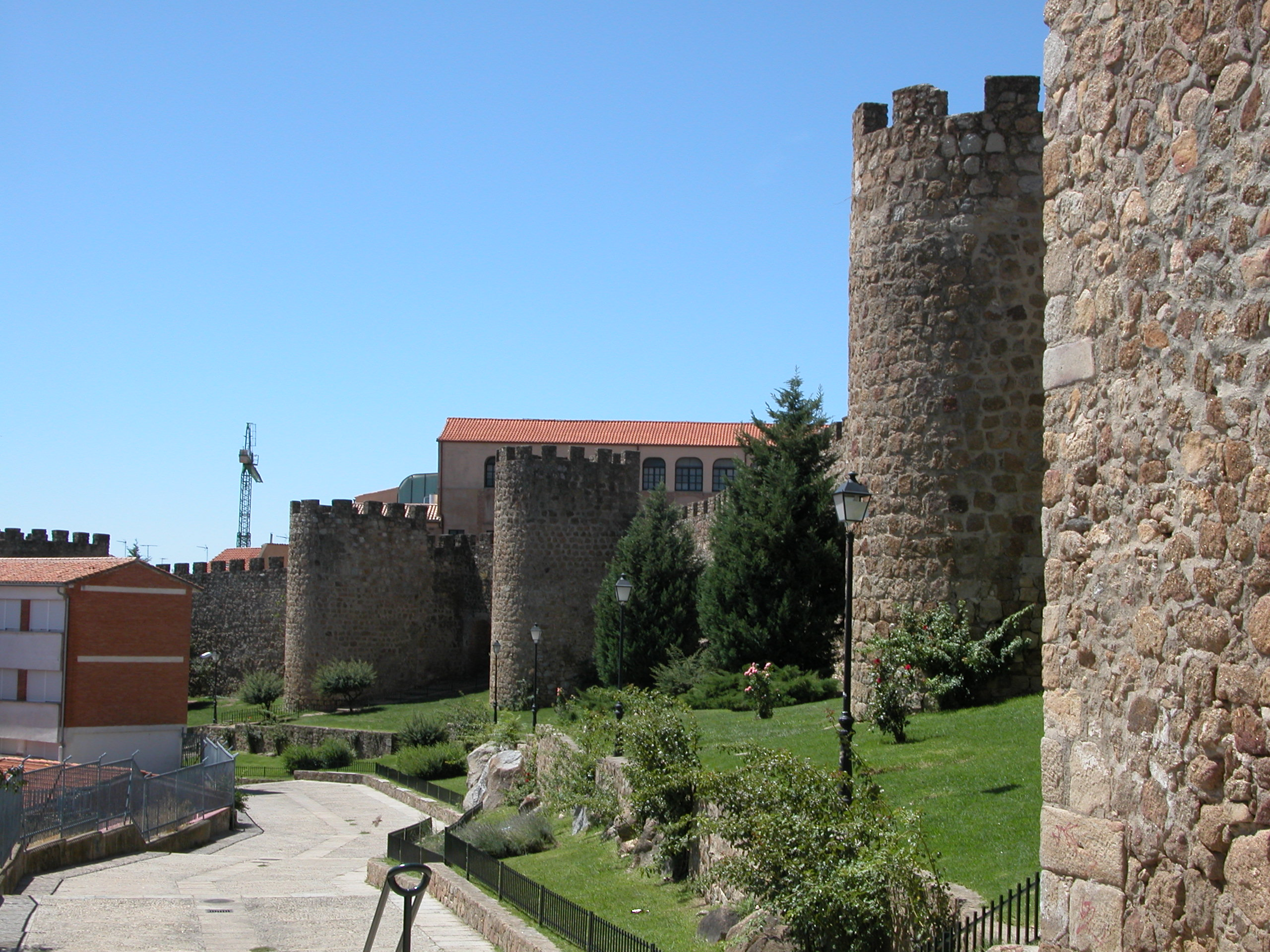
Medieval walls of Plasencia, built at the end of the 12th century

In 1195, following the Battle of Alarcos, Plasencia was recaptured by the Almohad Caliphate. According to some, Ibne Iúçufe, Yaqub al-Mansur's military chief, commanded the capture of the city; according to others, it was taken by al-Mansur himself, and returned to the possession of Alfonso VIII of Castile a year or two later. To ensure defense, the king ordered the walls to be completed, which would not be done until 1201. The walls were built as a double defense system, with a thick wall and a barbican, having a moat between them. The defense was reinforced by the presence of 70 semicircular turrets, 4 defensive towers leaning against the alcazar, seven main gates, and two wickets (minor gates).

In 1188, Pope Clement III created the diocese of Plasencia, and a year later the first bishop, Bricio, was appointed. The diocese had jurisdiction over Béjar, Medellín, and Trujillo. On the initiative of the bishop and cardinal Juan Carvajal, the diocese created Estudos de Humanidades in 1446, which constituted the first university-level school in Extremadura.

== 15th century ==
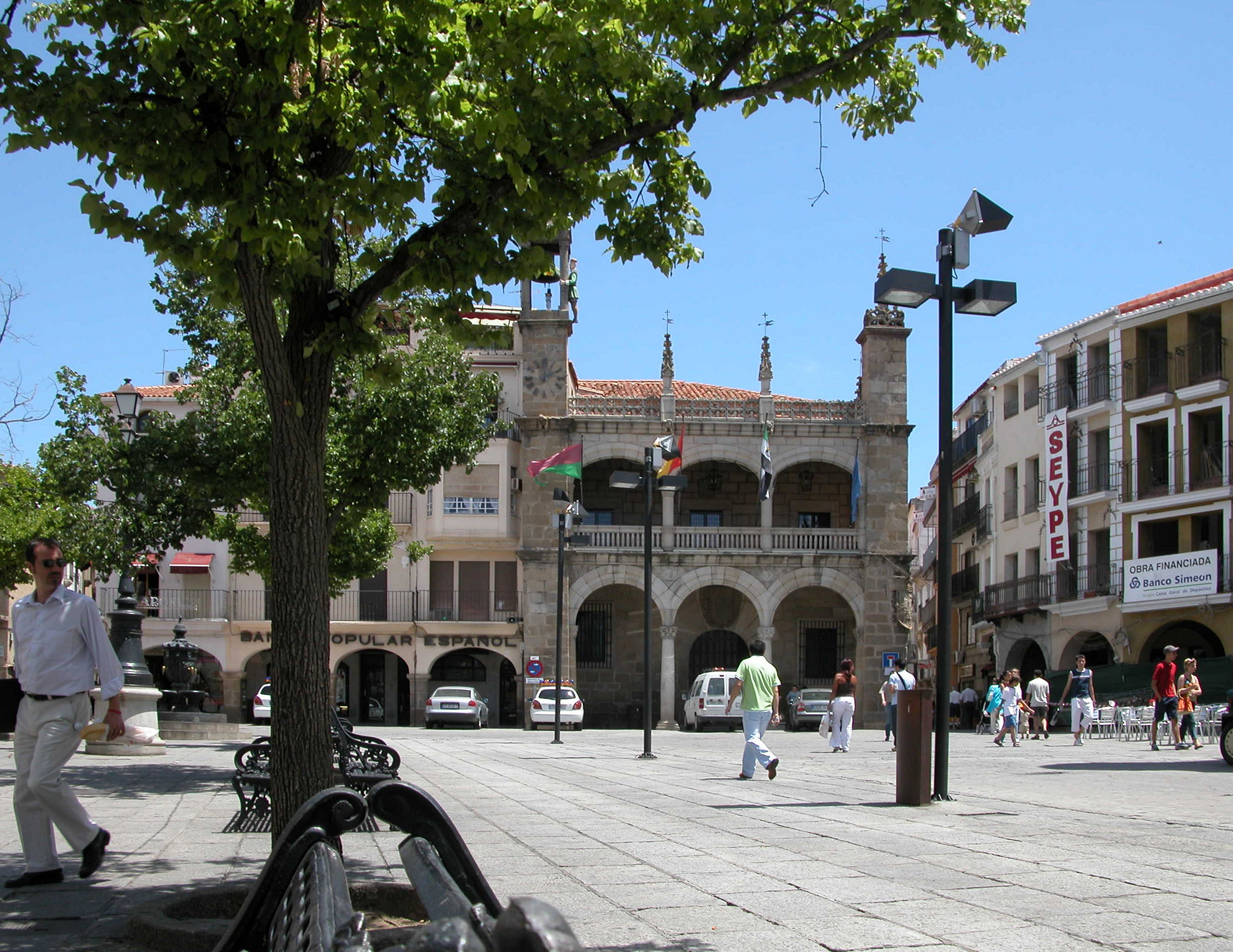
Plaza Mayor of Plasencia

Plasencia was a city of realengo (Note: Realengo is a Spanish word referring to the legal status of certain regions whose administration fell directly to the crown, instead of a lordship. See the article "Realengo" on Wikipedia in Spanish.) from its foundation until 1442. This meant that it was under the direct jurisdiction of the crown, rather than a landlord. The city's foral expressly determined which powers were to govern the municipality, which was divided between a corregedor and several regidores, as representatives of the monarch and the canon of the diocese.

During the Late Middle Ages, Plasencia experienced a flourishing period, in which the city council and the lay and religious nobles promoted various constructions. Several convents, churches, hospitals, fortress houses, and the completion of the cathedral, later called the "Old Cathedral", date from this period. The city then had the right to vote in the cortes (parliament) of Castile - as proof of this is the report that two proxies were sent to the courts held in Madrid in 1391.

The 15th century was a key period in the city's history, during which the feudalizing behaviors of the Middle Ages led to the end of the realengo status and the establishment of a lordship jurisdiction. In 1442 King John II of Castile gave the city to the family of Estúñigas (or Zúñigas), granting Pedro de Zúñiga y Leiva the title of Count of Plasencia. Upon becoming a lordship, Plasencia lost its right to vote in the cortes.

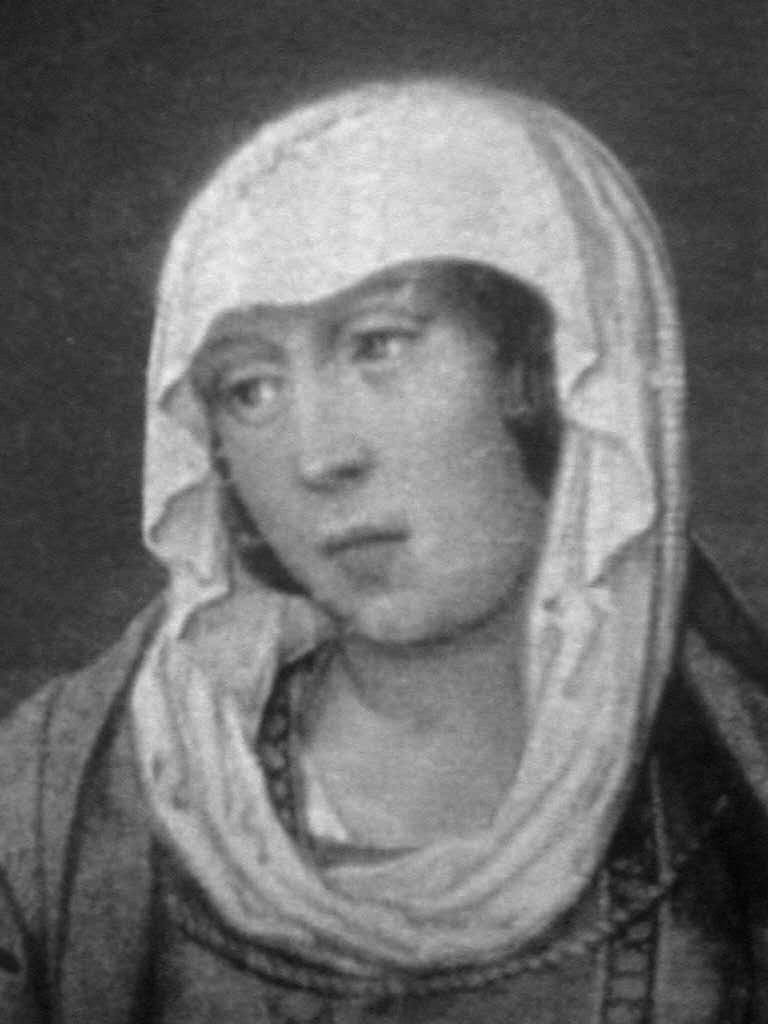
Joanna la Beltraneja

On April 27, 1465, King Henry IV of Castile was deposed in Plasencia. A few weeks later, the Count of Plasencia, Álvaro de Zúñiga y Guzmán, participated in the Farce of Ávila, taking the sword, a symbol of justice, from the wooden statue that represented the Castilian king and proclaiming the infante Alfonso king. In 1475, after the death of Henry IV, the Count of Plasencia sided with Joanna (nicknamed Beltraneja by her detractors, who said she was the daughter of Beltrán de La Cueva and not Henry) in the succession to the throne of Castile, against the other pretender, Henry's half-sister, Isabella, who would become known as "the Catholic". This succession crisis degenerated into the War of the Castilian Succession, in which France and Portugal also participated.

Joanna married her uncle Afonso V of Portugal in Plasencia, but the marriage was not recognized as the pope did not give the necessary authorization required due to the degree of kinship. A few days after the wedding, the city became the stage for the coronation of the couple as monarchs of Castile. Joanna addressed a manifesto to all the towns and cities of the kingdom, in which she informed of her marriage and justified her right to the throne. Later, as the conflict progressed, Álvaro de Zúñiga switched to the party of Isabella, who rewarded him in 1476 with the title of Duke of Plasencia. After the victory of the Catholic Monarchs in 1479, the duke became one of the leading nobles of the kingdom.

In June 1488, the duke died and was succeeded by his grandson, Álvaro de Zúñiga y Pérez de Guzmán. The nobility of Plasencia took advantage of the moment to rise up in arms against the Zúñiga and thus regain the power they had previously held in the city and over the lease of the lands that depended on it. The uprisings received the support of the Catholic Monarchs, who revoked John II's grant, arguing that it had been excessive and against his will. The revolt triumphed and the realengo was reinstated, being ratified on October 20, 1488, at the cathedral gates, in the presence of Ferdinand II, who swore to always defend the foral and Plasencia's freedom.

== Modern Age ==
=== 16th century ===
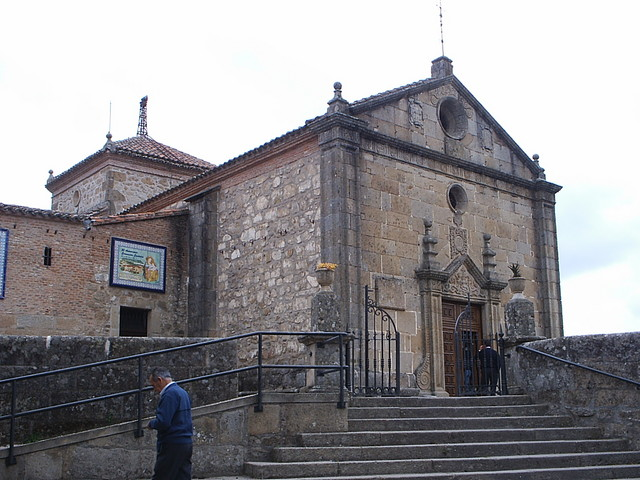
Church of the Virgin del Puerto, 15th century

At the beginning of the 16th century, most of the territory of Extremadura was included in the province of Salamanca, a situation that would only change in 1653, when the towns of Plasencia, Badajoz, Mérida, Trujillo, Cáceres, and Alcántara joined to buy a vote in the cortes, forming for the first time the province of Extremadura, to which other territories would be added.

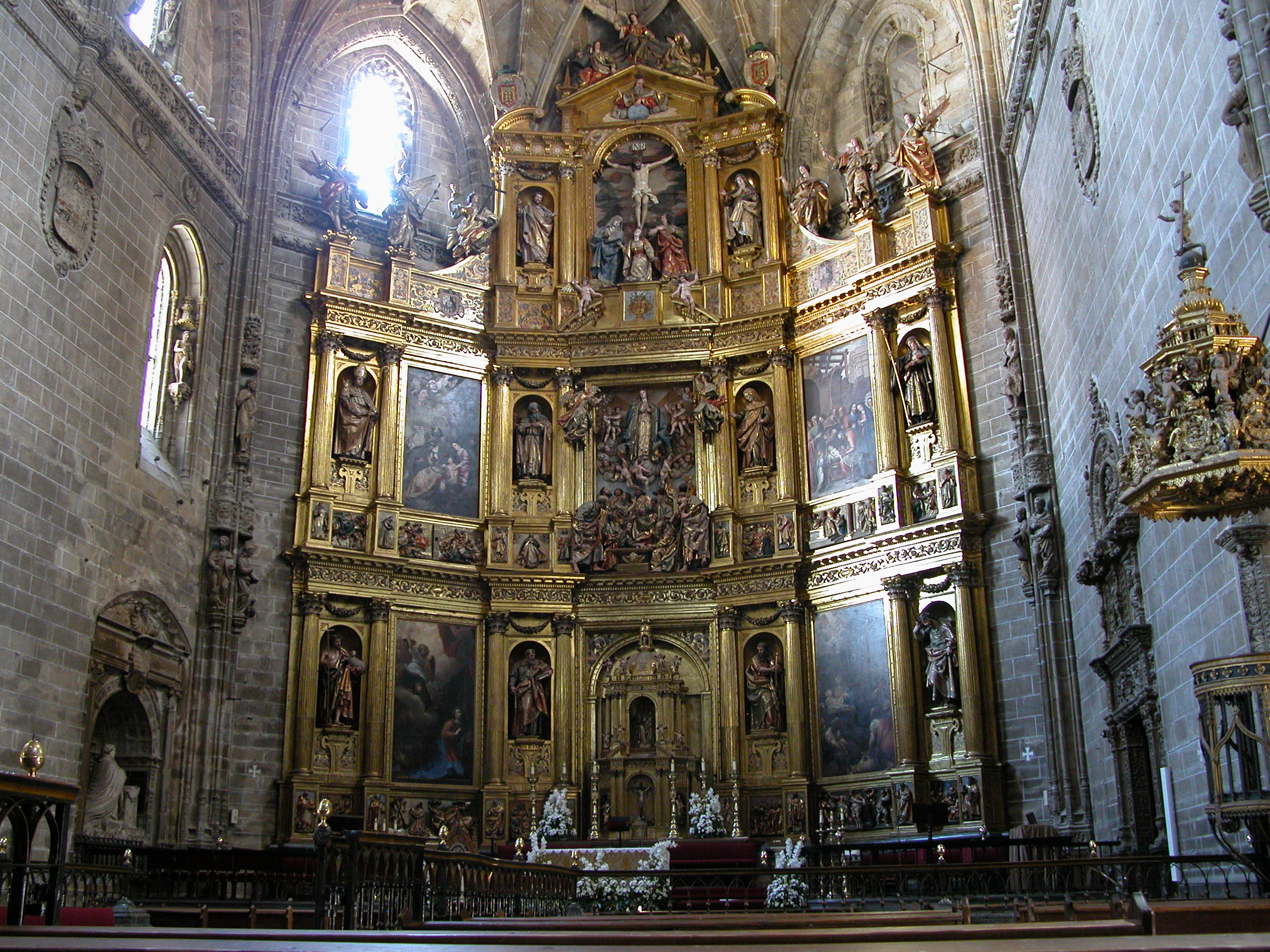
Retable of the New Cathedral of Plasencia, an example of the Spanish Baroque (17th century)

The prosperity of Plasencia continued throughout the 16th century and part of the 17th century, with a remarkable increase in population. The Renaissance building of the Casa Consistorial (Town Hall), designed in 1523 by Juan de Álava, dates from this period, as does the completion of the New Cathedral, which began in 1498 and ended in 1578. Numerous other monuments, such as the aqueduct and the palace of the marquess of Mirabel were also built. The city had by then universities dependent on the Dominicans and Jesuits.

In 1515, Ferdinand the II went to live in Plasencia on the advice of his doctors. He died in Madrigalejo while traveling from Plasencia to Guadalupe, where he was to attend a chapter of the military orders of Calatrava and Alcántara. It was in Plasencia that Bartolomé de las Casas first met with Ferdinand to present him with his views on the situation of the indigenous people of America.

In 1520, the city was involved in the popular rebellion that is known as the Revolt of the Comuneros, first on the side of the comuneros, and then on the opposite side of those loyal to the king. In 1540, Alfonso Camargo led the expedition organized by the bishop of Plasencia designed to explore and evangelize the New World. This expedition began the conquest of Argentine Patagonia and the Falkland Islands. One of his ships was the first European vessel to reach the Beagle Channel at the southern tip of South America.

The library of the royal palace of the El Escorial was created, in part, with the books belonging to the episcopal palace, which were transferred to the Madrid monastery by order of Philip II. Later, the placentine bishop Pedro Ponce de León donated to the Escorial part of his library, among whose works was the codex Glosas Emilianenses, from the late 10th or early 11th century (coming from the Monastery of San Millán de la Cogolla), until recently considered the oldest document where words written in Castilian are found.

== 17th century ==
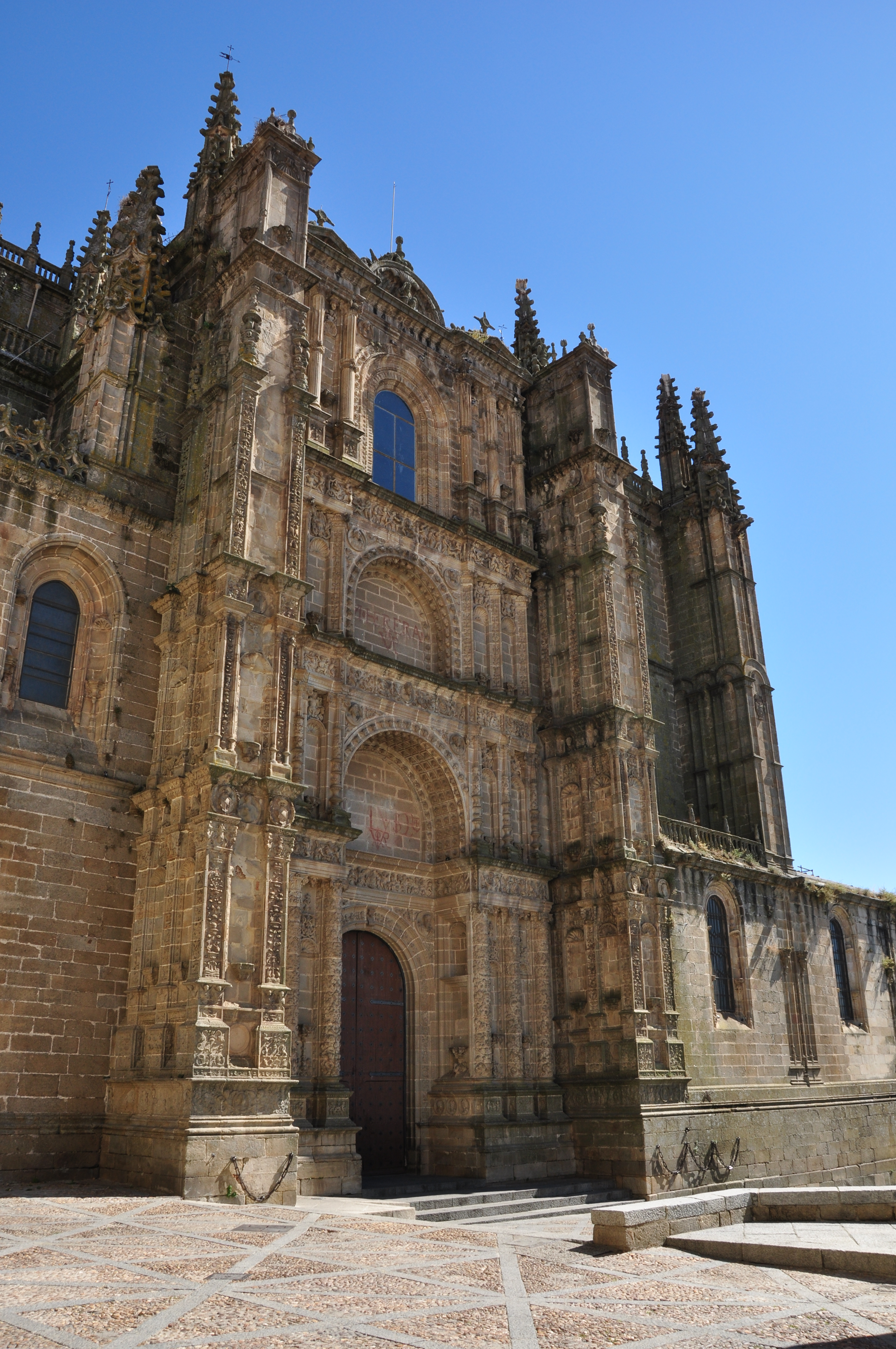
New Cathedral of Plasencia, late 15th-18th century

During the 17th and 18th centuries, Plasencia went through a decline in population, like most of Spain, with the number of inhabitants dropping from approximately 10,000 in the most prosperous period to only 4,852 in the 1876 census.

Among the factors that influenced such decline, is the expulsion of the Moriscos, decreed in 1609 by Philip III, which caused many people, who lived mostly outside the walls, to leave Plasencia. The wars of the 17th and 18th centuries also had a very negative impact, especially the uprising of Portugal against the Spanish king, which gave rise to the Restoration War between 1640 and 1668, and the War of the Spanish Succession, between 1702 and 1714. During the latter, the city was the scene of fights between the two pretenders to the Spanish throne, Philip V, and the Archduke of Austria (who would ascend to the Austrian throne as Charles VI). Plasencia's role was significant, with Charles' multinational troops occupying the city in 1706. The effort required to meet the needs of the army, such as housing, supplying recruits, animals, feeding soldiers, etc., had a very negative effect on the squalid local economy.

Supply crises and epidemics also contributed to the city's decay. Throughout the 17th and 18th centuries, mortality was high due to food shortages and disease. The city government proved ineffective in countering the decay. Citizen participation in the city's government was virtually non-existent, power was concentrated in a way never before seen in the aristocracy, and there was a great inflation of offices, a situation largely resulting from the sale of perpetual seats that began in the 16th century and continued into the next century. At the head of the government was a corregedor, who held the political, economic, judicial, and military functions. Next to the corregedor was the alcalde maior, who advised him, substituted him, and dealt with judicial matters. Besides these, there were more than forty perpetual regidores controlled by an oligarchy headed by the marquess of Mirabel, owner of several titles.

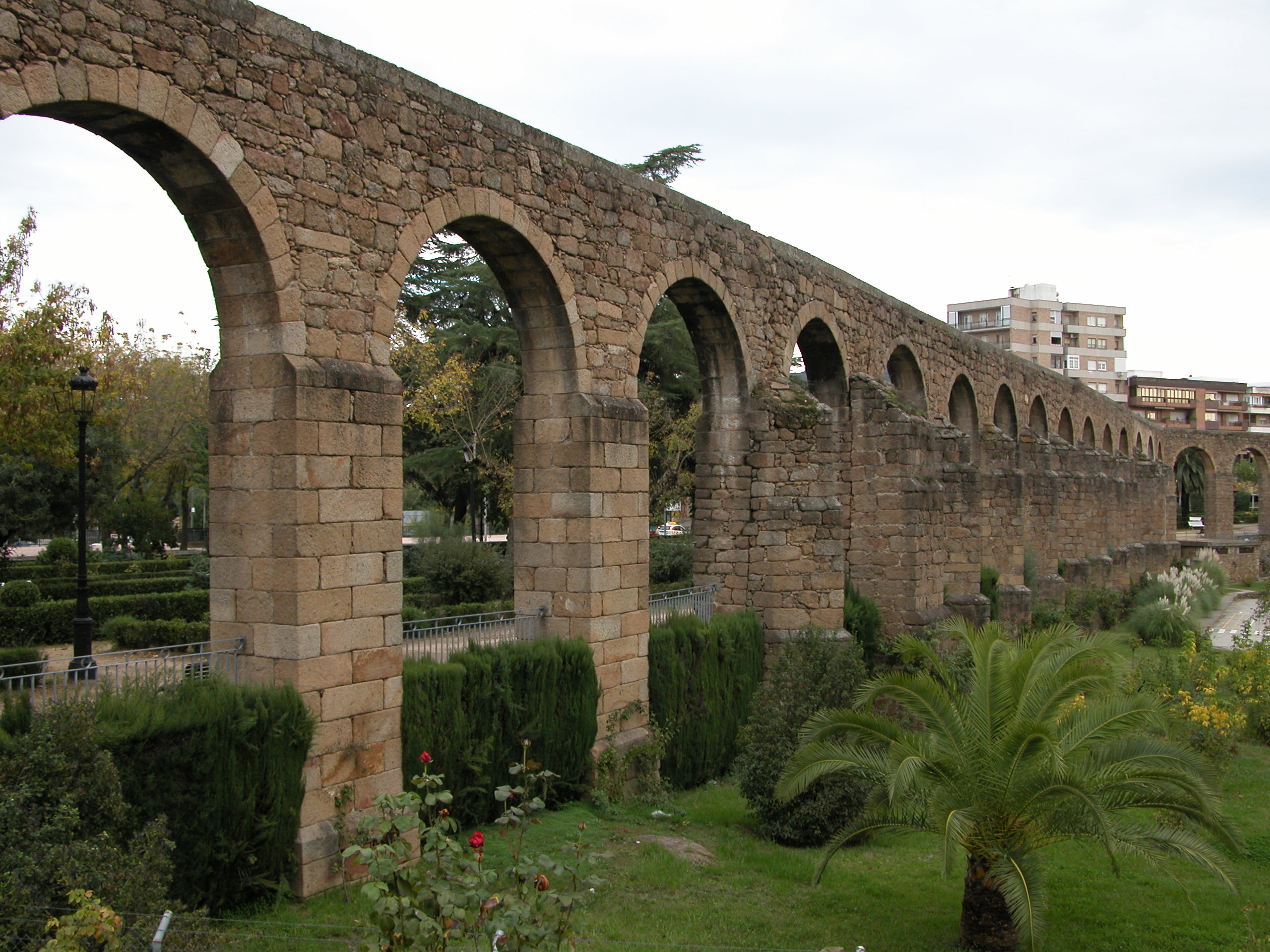
Plasencia Aqueduct, 16th century

Nevertheless, certain initiatives led to some economic growth, but they were not enough to pull the city out of stagnation. Among these initiatives are artistic manifestations, religious foundations, and maneuvers to gain more political power at the national level. The retable of the New Cathedral, a primordial work of the Spanish Baroque, dates from the 17th century. In the same century, smaller works were carried out, nowadays in different states of preservation: the hermitage of Santa Teresa in Dehesa de los Caballos, the hermitage of Santa Helena, also outside the walls, the Dean's House and the Royal Prison building, currently occupied by the Ayuntamiento. The convents of the Discalced Carmelites, the convent of the Capuchins, and a school were also founded by the chantre (cathedral choirmaster).

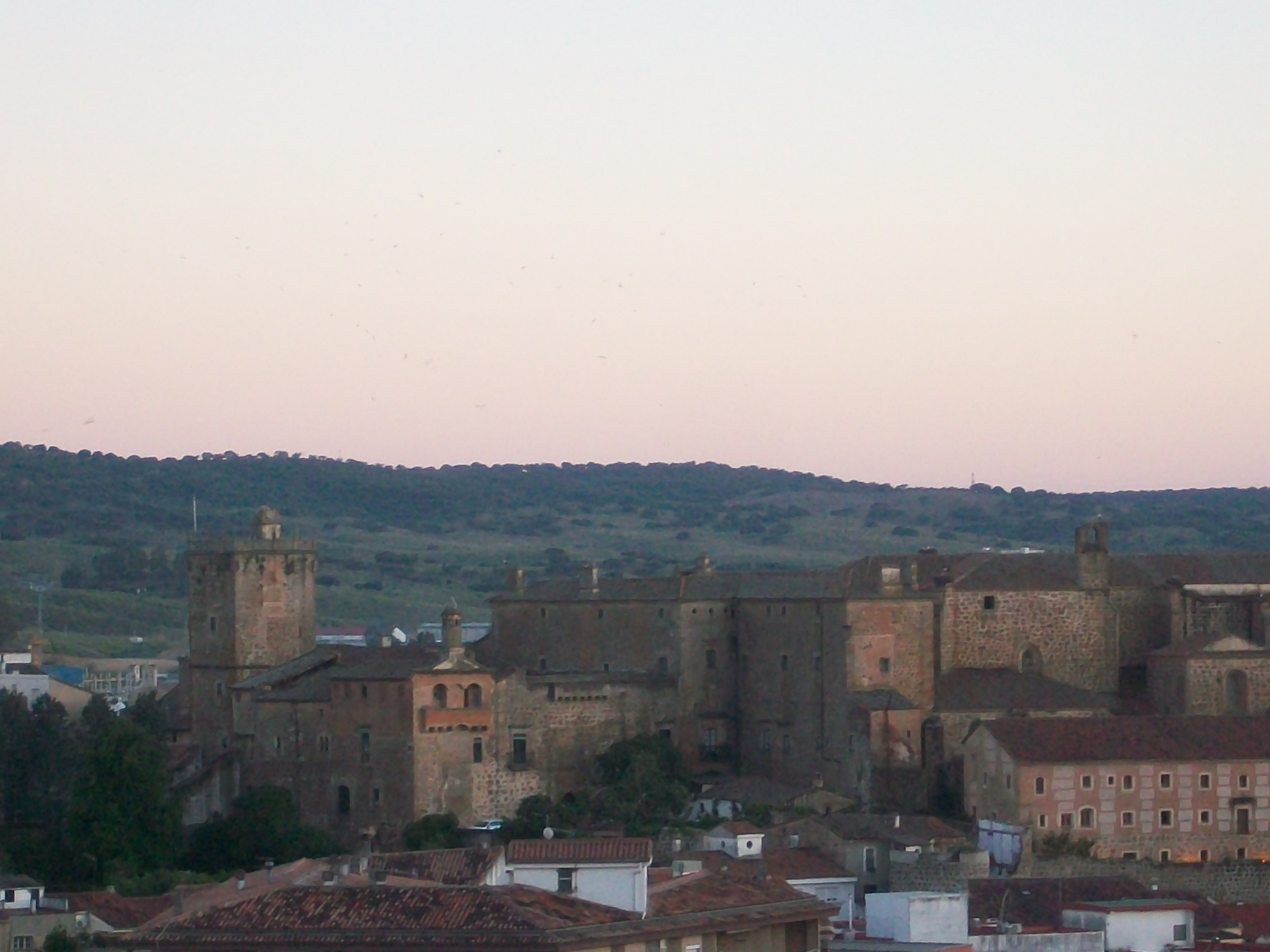
Palace of the marquess of Mirabel, 16th century

In the 18th century, other initiatives to improve this situation and end the economic penury took place, taking advantage of the reforms introduced by the Bourbon in the second half of the century, but the projects were unambitious and were limited to increasing the Propios (goods of a municipality that provide revenue by being leased), repairing roads, building bridges and little else.

The most important reformist project was the founding of the Sociedad Económica de Amigos del País (Note: The Sociedades Económicas de Amigos do País were non-governmental organizations inspired by the ideas of the Enlightenment, namely liberalism and physiocracy, aimed at promoting development through the study of economics and the search for solutions to problems detected. In Spain they were promoted by the Spanish government minister Pedro Rodríguez de Campomanes.) by the autarky in the 1770s, the first of its kind in Extremadura, however having a brief existence and scarce achievements. Also noteworthy are the works carried out on the initiative of the Bishop of Plasencia José González Laso, who was in charge of the diocese from 1766 until his death in 1803. His work was vast and covered various fields. In charity and health, he created a hospice in the old Jesuit school and enlarged the Santa María Hospital; in education, he reformed the Estudos de Humanidades (a university-like school). However, the best-known aspect of the work of José González Laso, and the one that had the greatest impact on his contemporaries, was the commitment to construction, with numerous roads and bridges having been opened and repaired, which contributed decisively to the relief of the chronic problem of communication routes. But the bishop's activity focused even more on urbanism, reforming the episcopal palace and building new streets, for which it was necessary to tear down part of the walled enclosure.

== Contemporary Age ==
=== War of Independence (1808-1812) ===
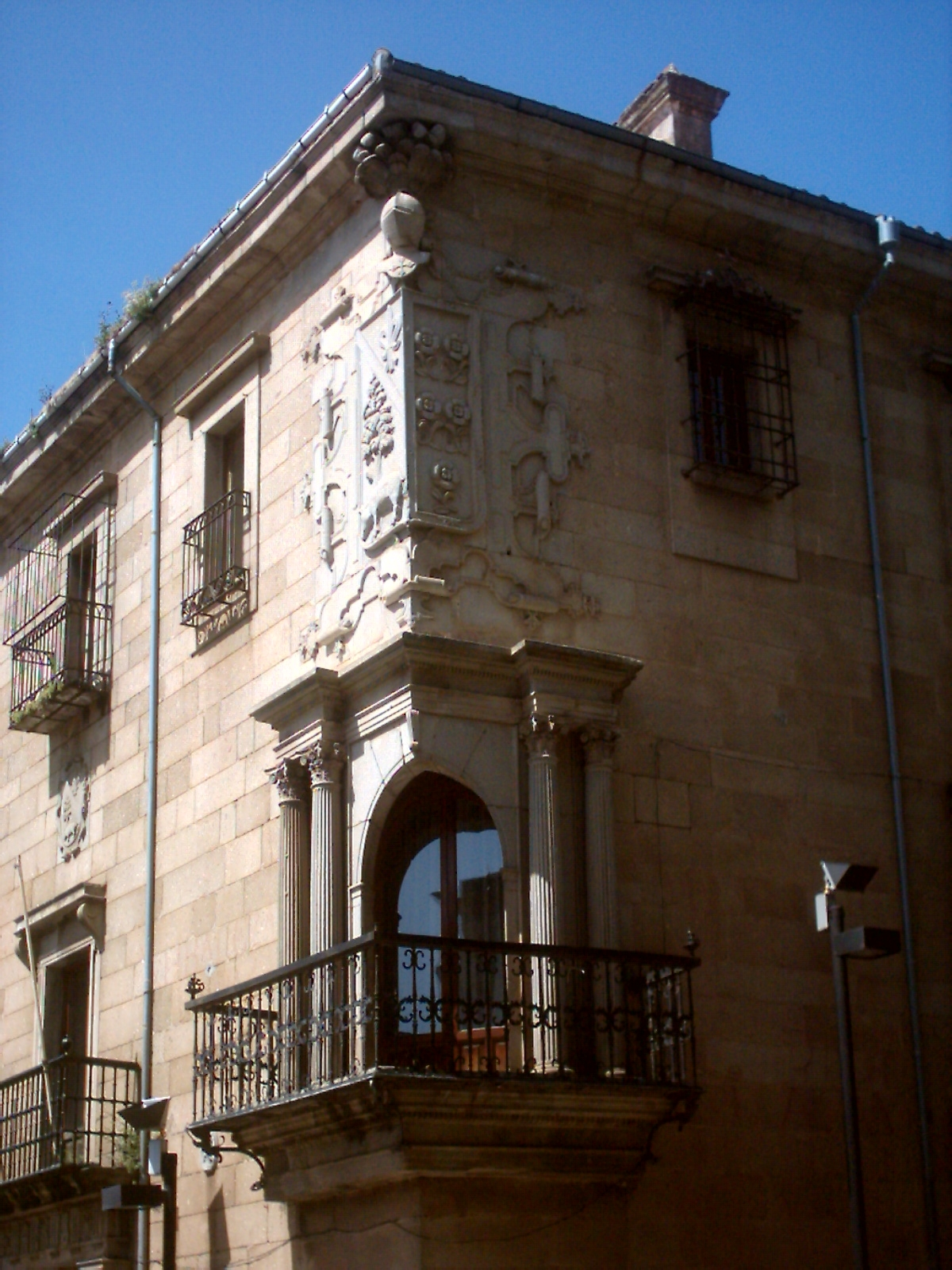
Dean's House, 17th century

Due to its strategic location, on the border between Castile and the southern peninsula, Plasencia was an important military base during the Spanish War of Independence, known in Portugal as the Peninsular War or French invasions. The city served as headquarters and supply center for the troops, both French, Patriotic and Anglo-Portuguese allies, but no major battles took place in its vicinity. In the four years that the war lasted, the city was invaded and occupied by the French on twelve occasions, causing severe economic problems and seriously damaging many civil and ecclesiastical public buildings.

On June 8, 1808, a riot broke out that ended with the arrest and subsequent murder of several inhabitants accused of colluding with the invader. In December of the same year, the French army, commanded by Marshal Lefebvre, arrived at the base for the first time and remained there for two months, after which it marched towards Castile. The passage of French Marshal Soult was particularly devastating, with the city being terrorized, and several villages burned.

In July 1811, the last invasion of Napoleonic troops took place, a division of French troops commanded by General Buñiré and another of Portuguese troops in the service of General Auguste de Marmont. The troops would only leave the city in December, and they did so with great disregard for the population, who were forced to hand over all their food supplies. In their retreat, the troops destroyed the crops and imposed a contribution of 90,000 reales, to which were added the amounts they extorted from the locals and the theft of all the livestock they managed to take.

=== Formation of the province of Caceres (1833) ===
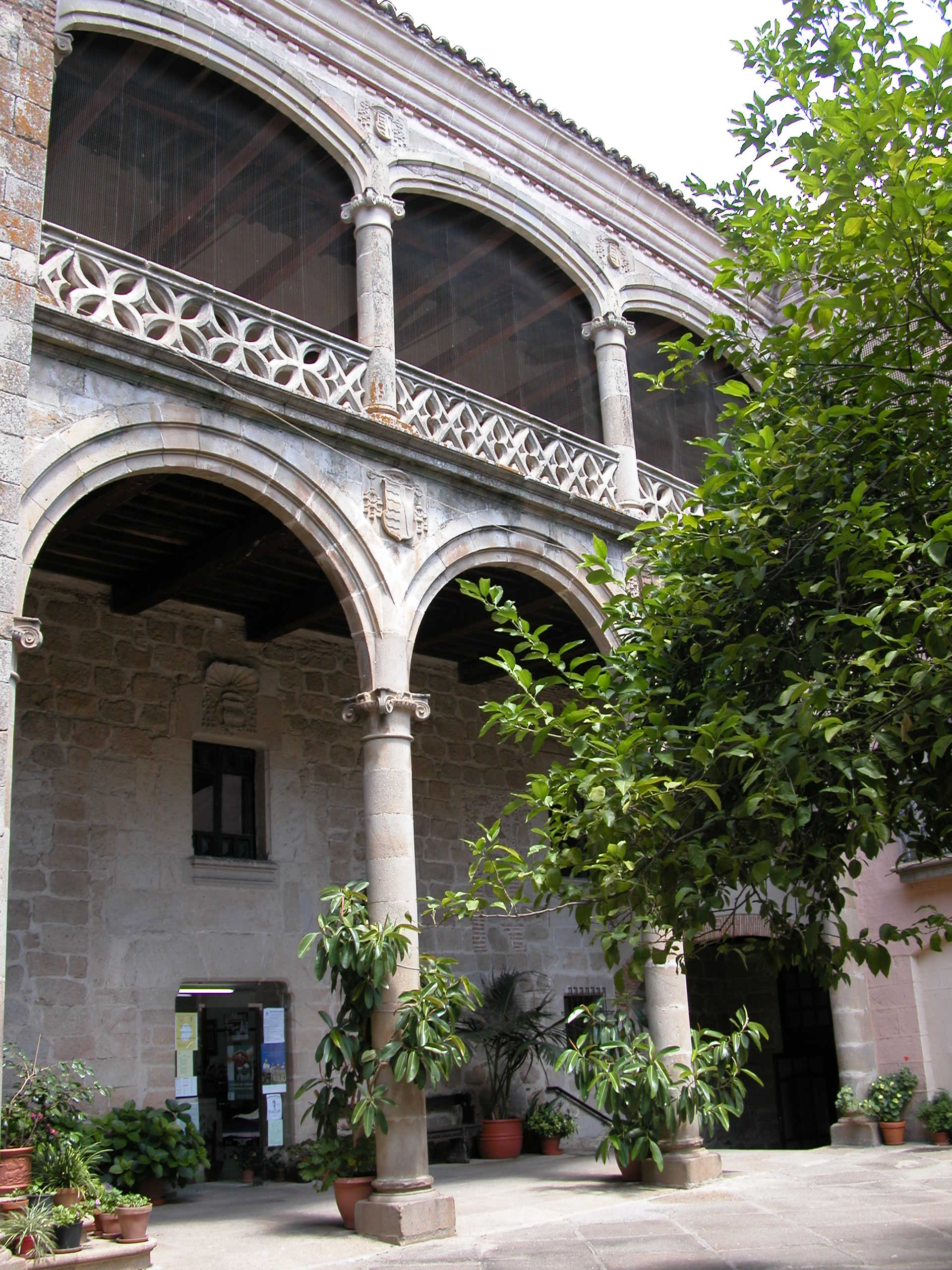
Courtyard of the Episcopal Palace

Plasencia tried to be the provincial capital, but that status was given definitively to Cáceres in 1833. Progressively, the city was stripped of many public services, which moved to the capital, contributing to the decay of the Plasencia's social and economic spheres. When the Ancien Régime (Note: In Spain, the term Ancien Régime refers to the period between the Catholic Monarchs (last third of the 16th century) and the establishment of the constitutional monarchy, which began in 1812, was interrupted and definitively re-established in 1833. See the article "Antiguo Régimen" on Wikipedia in Spanish.) fell, the city became a municipio constitucional. Since1834 it has been the seat of a partido judicial. (Note: Partido Judicial - Spanish judicial division. See article "Partido judicial (España)" on Wikipedia in Spanish.)

=== Restoration (1874-1931) ===
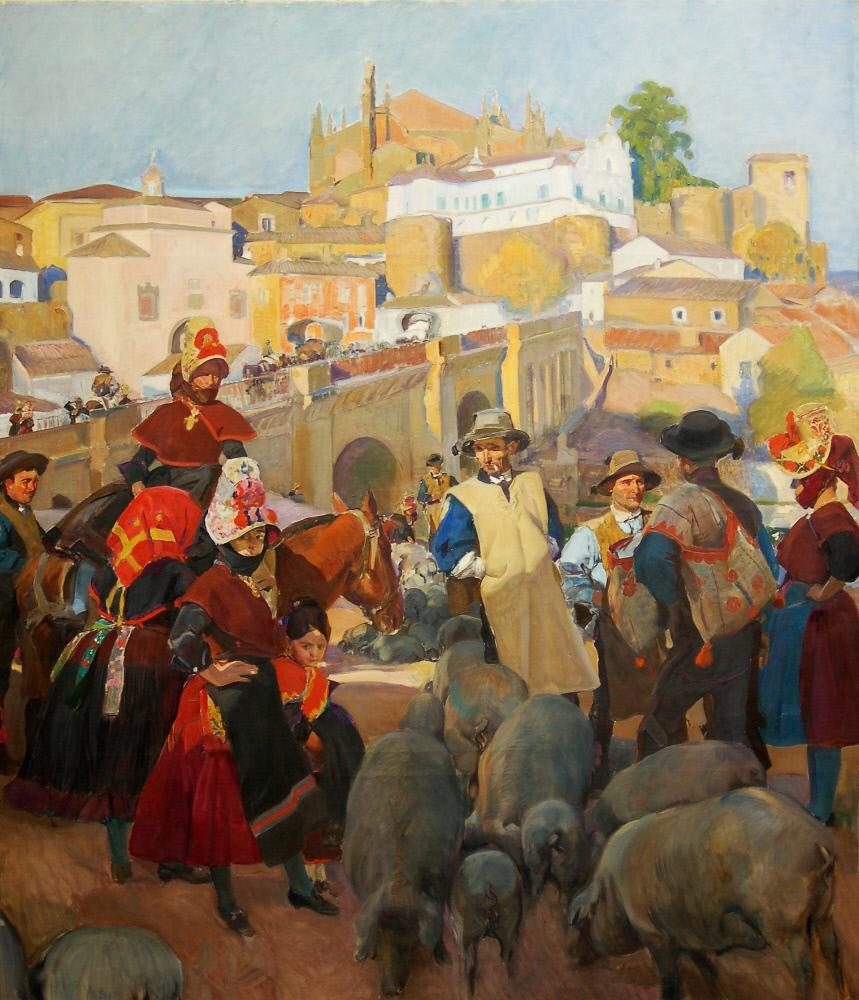
Extremadura: El mercado, painting by Joaquín Sorolla

During the Bourbon Restoration, the historical period from the pronouncement of General Arsenio Martínez Campos in 1874, which overthrew the First Republic, to the proclamation of the Second Republic in 1931, political life in Plasencia tended towards monotony, although there was an important development in social life, economy, urbanism, education, culture, etc.

In terms of urbanism, long-term works were carried out, such as new roads, squares, and green spaces. To improve the vitiated atmosphere of the intramural space, the wall was opened at various points. The College of San Calixto for male orphans and the College of San José for orphans, both of which were charitable, a new seminary next to the Cathedral Square, and the present bullring, inaugurated in 1882, were built. But the work of greater socio-economic scope was the arrival of the railroad, with the Madrid-Lisbon and Plasencia-Astorga lines, which broke the historical isolation of the region by increasing the number of travelers and intensifying commercial exchange and the transport of goods and livestock.

In 1901 Queen Maria Christina awarded the city the title of La Muy Benéfica in recognition of humanitarian aid to soldiers repatriated in 1898 from Cuba and the Philippines following the Spanish-American War. In the early 20th century, the land was owned by a few individuals, which generated an increasing number of day-laborers who were forced to emigrate overseas. In 1911, the Caja de Ahorros de Plasencia, a banking institution, was founded to boost the city's economy.

=== Second Republic (1931-1936) ===
When the Second Spanish Republic was proclaimed in 1931, an incident happened, with two night watchmen being murdered in the Plaza Mayor. However, there are no reports of other violent incidents during the rest of the republican period. The municipal elections of 1931 were won by the left-wing parties and the socialist Modesto Durán Jímenez was appointed alcalde, but would resign four months later. In the 1933 elections, the right-wing parties won, and the 1936 elections were won again by the left-wing parties, with Durán Jímenez becoming alcalde again, resigning shortly after for health reasons. When the military coup of July 1936 took place, the alcalde Miguel Cermeño Pedreño got deposed on July 19, 1936, by the Nationalist military commander José Puente Ruiz.

Among the achievements of this republican period were the use of the waters of the Jerte, Alagón and Tiétar rivers, through the construction of several dams which fed irrigated areas, the construction of the municipal market and the creation of the university Instituto Nacional de Bachillerato Gabriel y Galán. Health and education services were also developed. The Second Republic created expectations of what agrarian reform could bring in terms of ending injustices in land ownership, but the ideas of land distribution and the liberation of communal land (Note: Translation note: rescate de las comunales in the original translates as "liberation of communal lands". The term comunale (See article "Comunales" in Wikipedia in Spanish) appears in feudalism and was synonymous with the fief, that is, land owned by a landlord, whose exploitation was given to vassals in exchange for rent. With the end of feudalism, it also came to mean municipal land that was leased. However, in practice, many of these lands ended up in the possession of lords, a situation that lasted until the 20th century.) were quickly forgotten due to internal divisions in the republican political forces and resistance to change from the oligarchs and conservative sectors of the army, who tried to use all means to maintain the old order.

=== Civil war (1936-1939) ===
On July 19, 1936, in the first moments of the Alzamiento Nacional (the name by which the military coup that marked the Spanish Civil War came to be known), José Puente Ruiz, commander of the city-based No. 2 Machine Gun Battalion, sided with the insurgent military, ousting the democratically elected alcalde Miguel Cermeño Pedreño. The military's communiqué read as follows:

Don José Puente Ruiz, military commander of Plasencia, to its inhabitants and those of its Judicial Party.

I hereby make known:

1st - As of 2pm today, July 19, a state of war is declared in Plasencia.

2nd - From this moment on, groups of more than two people are prohibited.

3rd - All members of this city who are in possession of firearms will hand them in to the reception commission, which from this moment on will be located on the steps of the avenue next to the barracks. This delivery will take place within a maximum period of 4 hours after the publication of this notice.

4th - After this deadline, whoever is found with a weapon during a search or house search will be shot immediately.

5th - I hope that the common sense and love of all citizens will not give them reason to blindly keep weapons and such terrible sanctions be applied.

6th - All municipal authorities in this place are dismissed, and will be replaced in due course.

7th - All people who do not voluntarily join this movement in defense of Spain will immediately report to this barracks.

8th - Strikes are prohibited

Plasencia July 19, 1936.

— Lieutenant Colonel, military commander, José Puente

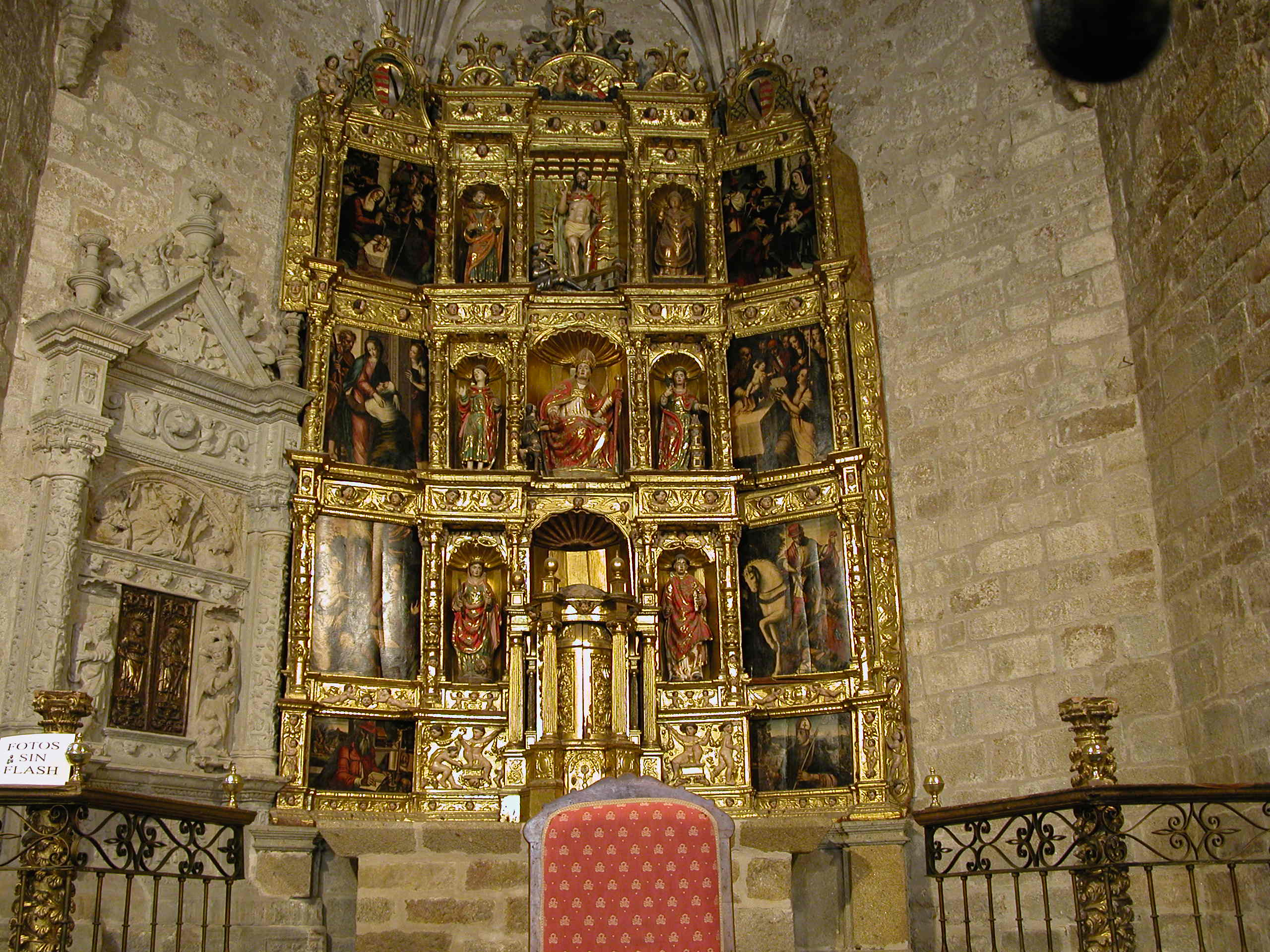
Saint Martin's church altarpiece, 15th century

As soon as the coup succeeded, repression began against individuals known to belong to the Popular Front, both in Plasencia and in the surrounding comarcas. There were two types of repression; the first and most cruel consisted of indiscriminate killings by members of uncontrolled fascist groups. It is not possible to determine exactly how many people died in this period, due to the difficulty in registering the real cause of death of the bodies found in the various stops, such as road ditches. In the sources consulted by Sánchez-Marín Enciso, there were 48 murders of this nature in 1936, whose corpses were walked around the streets to serve as a lesson.

For the rest of the civil war, there was no record of any more murders of this kind. The second type of repression consisted of death sentences handed down by military courts of exception. The executions took place on the firing range of the Machine Gun Battalion. There are 101 documented executions of death sentences, both of individuals from Plasencia and the surrounding area. Among the placentines killed were the cenetista (activist of the CNT's Anarcho-syndicalist organization, National Confederation of Labor) Nicolás Benevente Velas, the 14-year-old Teodora Velasco Durán, who was shot while going to the prison to bring food for an imprisoned relative, and the socialist leaders Pedro Rabazo Sánchez and Joaquín Rosado Alvárez de Sotomayor, who had been republican alcaldes of the city.

There were no war scenes in Plasencia apart from the Republican bombings that occurred on August 17 and 18, 1936, which caused five deaths among military and civilians, and some less relevant episodes, such as the explosion that caused three deaths. However, some placentines died on the combat fronts on both sides. Because it had an important hospital, the city became a hospital center where the wounded on the battle fronts were evacuated, and several buildings, such as colleges, seminaries, and the asylum were converted into temporary hospitals. Economic activity was greatly impoverished, especially agriculture, due to the lack of labor and the permanent demand for all kinds of taxes and fees to finance the conflict.

=== Franco dictatorship (1939-1976) ===
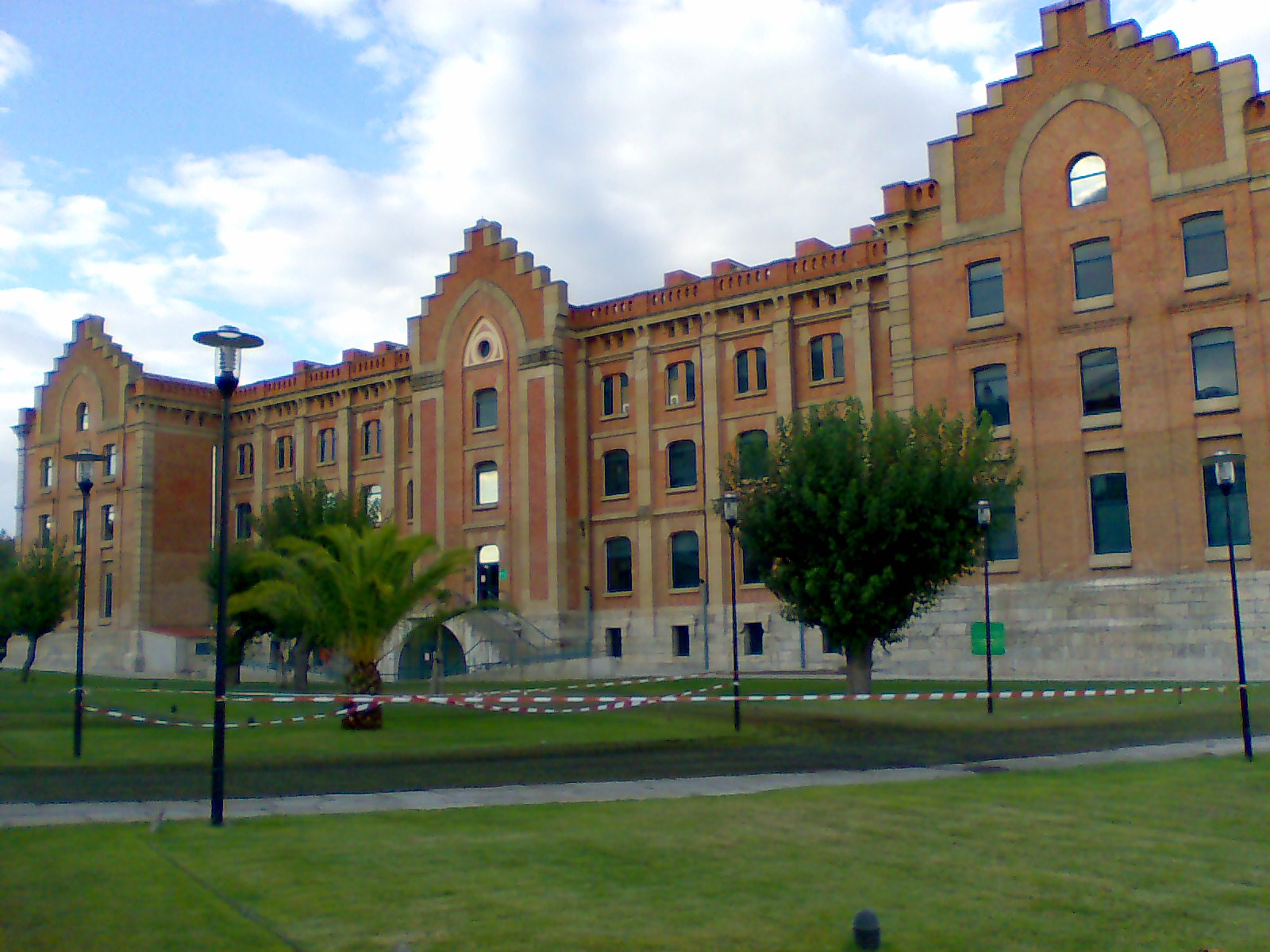
Old military base.

After the end of the civil war, hunger and poverty continued in the city to the degree that, as in the rest of Spain, rationing of basic food and hygiene products was imposed, a situation that would continue throughout the 1940s. The most relevant industrial activity in the city in the early days of Francoism was the production of flour in the mills along the river and bread in the numerous bakeries. There were also soap and brick industries.

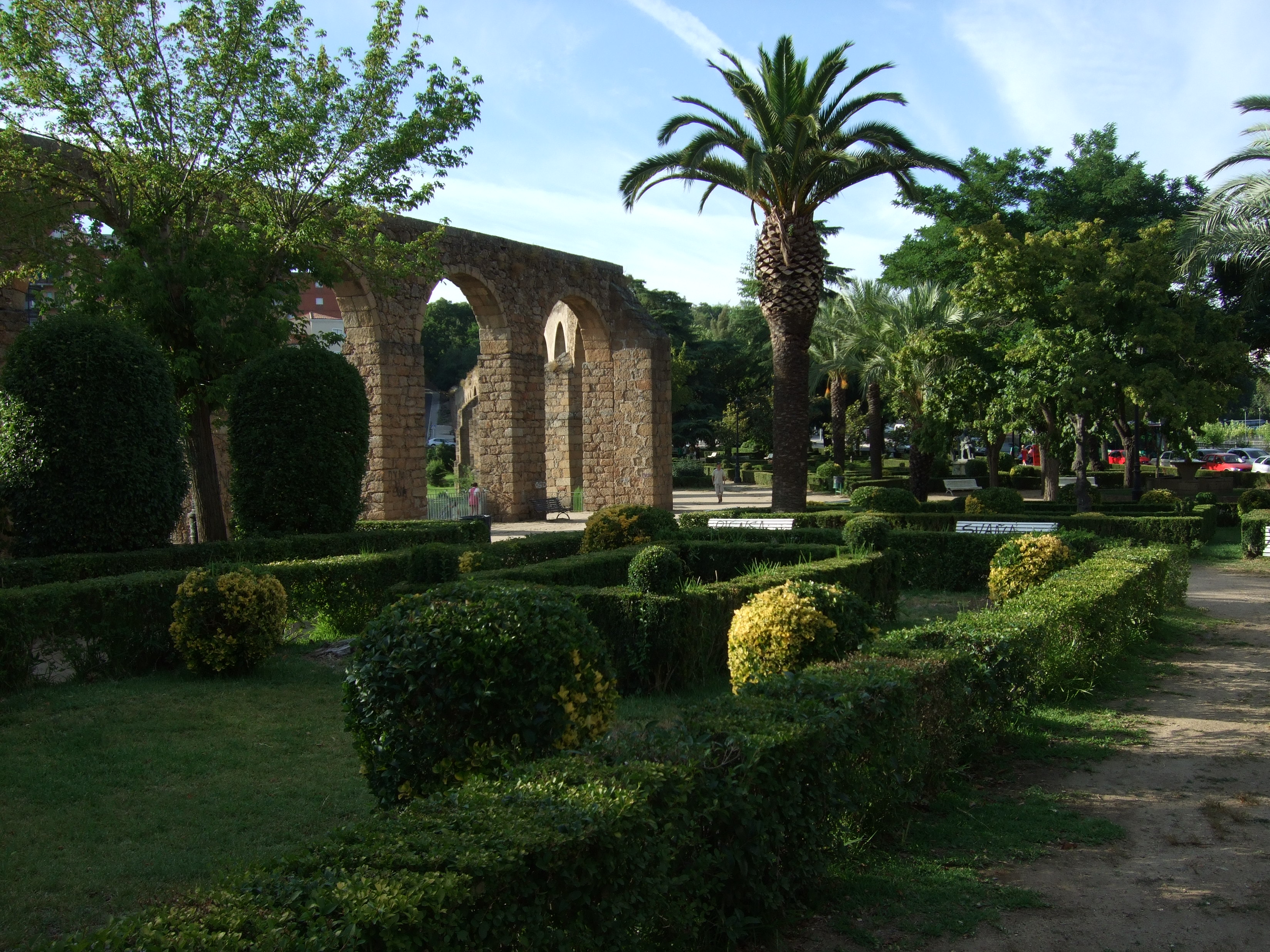
Santo Antão Park and aqueduct

The construction sector had little activity as none of the buildings or roads in the municipality were damaged by the war, leaving no space for the funding of restoration activities from which other places benefited. During the war and post-war periods, the palaces of the marquess de la Constancia and the marquess de Mirabel, and the bullring were rehabilitated using forced labor from Republican prisoners coming from the city and surrounding areas. The prisoners were also used to build the Parque de Los Pinos.

In February 1941, the Regiment of Infantry Military Orders No. 37 was installed in the city, which played an important role in the local economy due to the high number of outsider soldiers it relied on. One of the regiment's most important milestones was the creation of the Company of Special Operations No. 11, founded in 1969, dependent on the Infantry Regiment "Inmemorial del Rey" No. 1 of Madrid. The demographic dynamics evolved little from 1940 to 1960, to then go through a remarkable increase in population, motivated by the increase in birth rate and the development generated by the industrial park created south of the municipality, which attracted immigrants from neighboring localities. The construction of several dams in locations not far from the city, which employed many people, also contributed to the population increase.

=== Democracy ===
The democratic period began in Plasencia with the first democratic autonomous local elections. Since then, the municipal government has been presided over by all the majority parties that have existed or still exist (2009) in Spain - UCD, CDS, PP, and PSOE - and all transfers of power have taken place normally. The period from 1979 to 2009 was characterized by the development of the services sector (health and education) and by the creation of newly irrigated areas in the valley of the Alagón and Tiétar rivers, which revived the life of the city, turning it into a meeting point for neighboring municipalities. Tourism, cultural and leisure initiatives have also been developed, which contribute to Plasencia being reference in Extremadura region.

== See also ==
- Count of Plasencia
