= Francisco Garcia de Padilla =

Spanish Roman Catholic prelate

Most Reverend Francisco Garcia de Padilla
- Bishop of Santo Domingo
- Church: Catholic Church
- Diocese: Diocese of Santo Domingo
- In office: 1511–1515
- Predecessor: None
- Successor: Alejandro Geraldini
- Previous post: Bishop-elect of Bayuna (1504–1511)

Orders
- Consecration: 2 May 1512

Personal details
- Died: 1515 Santo Domingo

Francisco Garcia de Padilla, O.F.M. (Died 1515) was a Roman Catholic prelate who served as Bishop of Santo Domingo (1511–1515) and as Bishop-elect of Bayuna (1504–1511), one of the first three Roman Catholic bishops in the New World.

== Biography ==
Francisco Garcia de Padilla was ordained a priest in the Order of Friars Minor. On November 15, 1504, he was appointed the first and only Bishop of Bayuna. The Diocese of Bayuna (located at Lares de Guahaba) was one of three dioceses - the other two being the Diocese of Magua, located at Concepción de La Vega, and the Archdiocese of Hyaguata, located at Santo Domingo - created in the New World by a Papal Bull Illius fulciti issued by Pope Julius II. The Bull never went into effect due to the objection of Ferdinand II of Aragon who opposed that the Bull gave the dioceses the right to receive a portion of the earnings from the gold and precious stones discovered in the territory. On August 8, 1511, Pope Julius II issued a new Papal Bull Pontifax Romanus which extinguished the previously granted ecclesiastical province and its dioceses and reassigned their delegated bishops.

On 13 Aug 1511, Francisco Garcia de Padilla, Bishop Elect of Bayuna, was reassigned to the Diocese of Santo Domingo. His compatriots, Father Alonso Manso, Bishop Elect of Magua, was reassigned to the Diocese of Puerto Rico; and Pedro Suárez de Deza, Bishop Elect of Hyaguata, was reassigned to the Diocese of Concepción de la Vega. On 2 May 1512, he was consecrated bishop. He served as Bishop of Santo Domingo until his death in 1515.

While bishop, he was the principal consecrator of: Pascual Rebenga de Ampudia, Bishop of Burgos (1497).

== External links and additional sources ==
- Cheney, David M. "Archdiocese of Santo Domingo". Catholic-Hierarchy.org. (for Chronology of Bishops) ^{[self-published]}
- Chow, Gabriel. "Metropolitan Archdiocese of Santo Domingo". GCatholic.org. (for Chronology of Bishops) ^{[self-published]}

Catholic Church titles
Preceded by None	Bishop-elect of Bayuna; 1504–1511	Succeeded by None
Preceded by None	Bishop of Santo Domingo; 1511–1515	Succeeded by Alejandro Geraldini
