= Gómez de Toledo Solís =

Most Reverend Gómez de Toledo Solís
- Bishop of Plasencia
- Church: Catholic Church
- In office: 1508–1521
- Predecessor: Gutierre Álvarez de Toledo
- Successor: Bernardino López de Carvajal y Sande

Personal details
- Died: 1521 Plasencia, Spain

Gómez de Toledo Solís (died 1521) was a Roman Catholic prelate who served as Bishop of Plasencia (1508–1521).

On 22 December 1508, Gómez de Toledo Solís was appointed during the papacy of Pope Julius II as Bishop of Plasencia. He served as Bishop of Plasencia until his death in 1521.

== External links and additional sources ==
- Cheney, David M. "Diocese of Plasencia". Catholic-Hierarchy.org. (for Chronology of Bishops) ^{[self-published]}
- Chow, Gabriel. "Diocese of Plasencia (Spain)". GCatholic.org. (for Chronology of Bishops) ^{[self-published]}

Catholic Church titles
Preceded by Gutierre Álvarez de Toledo	Bishop of Plasencia; 1508–1521	Succeeded by Bernardino López de Carvajal y Sande
