= Roman Catholic Diocese of Bayuna =

The Roman Catholic Diocese of Bayuna was a short-lived (1504–1511) Antillian Catholic bishopric with its seat at Lares de Guahaba.

== History ==
It was established on 15 November 1504 as the Diocese of Bayuna, one of the first bishoprics in the New World, on Spanish-colonial territory formally split off canonically from the Archdiocese of Sevilla (Andalusia, Spain), like the Archdiocese of Hyaguata which became its Metropolitan, both in the present Dominican Republic, on Hispaniola (Greater Antilles).

It was suppressed on 8 August 1511, having had a single incumbent, who was transferred to the newly erected then Diocese of Santo Domingo (later Metropolitan).

== Episcopal Ordinary ==
Suffragan Bishop of Bayuna

- Bishop-elect Francisco Garcia de Padilla, (Spaniard?) Friars Minor (O.F.M.) (15 November 1504 – 13 August 1511), afterwards the first Bishop of Santo Domingo (Dominican Republic) (13 August 1511 – his death in 1515).

== See also ==
- List of Catholic dioceses in the Dominican Republic

== Sources and external links ==
- GCatholic - data for all sections
