= Diocese of Plasencia =

Roman Catholic diocese in Spain

Diocese of Plasencia Dioecesis Placentina in Hispania Diócesis de Plasencia

Catholic
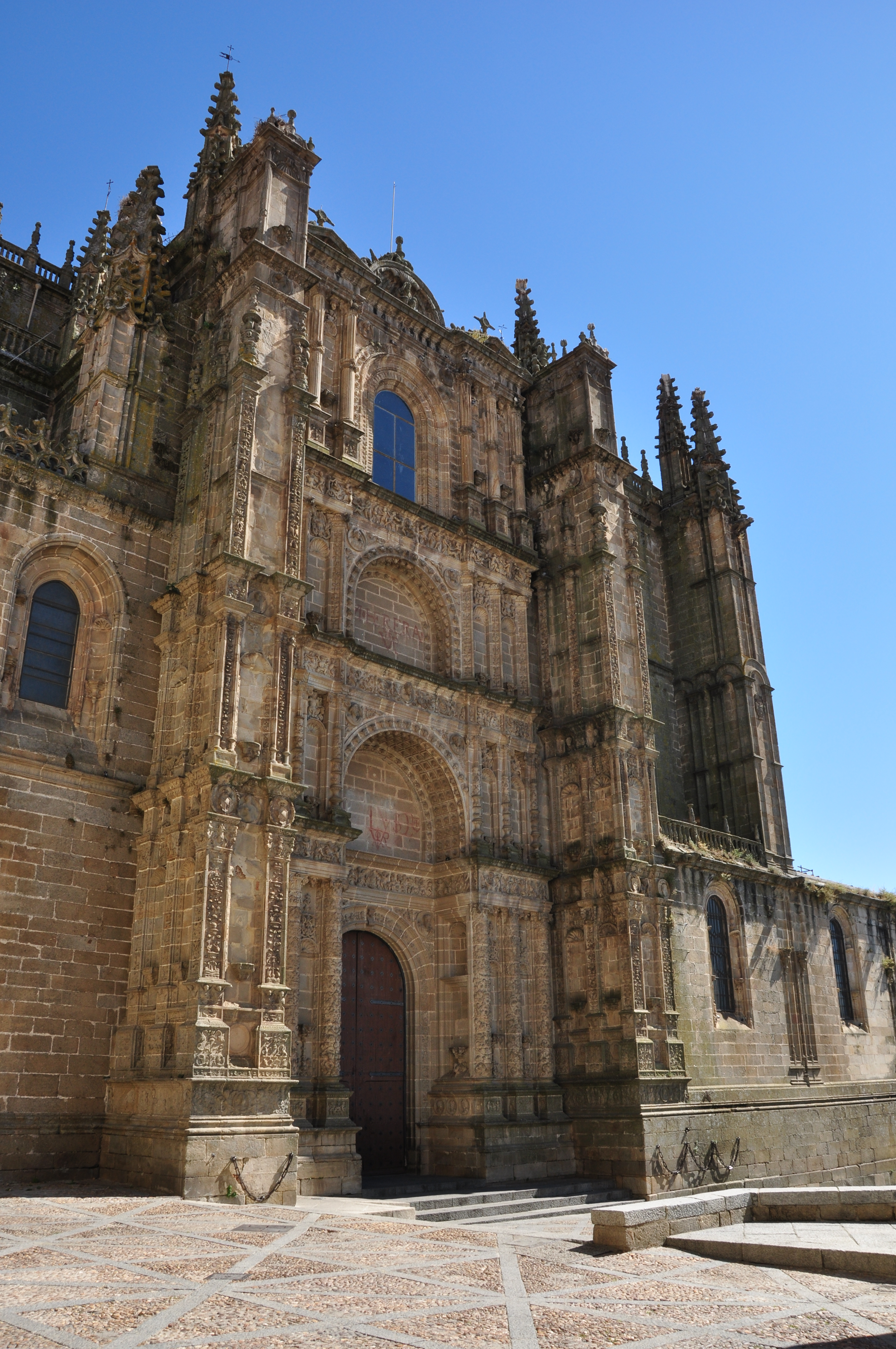
- Plasencia Cathedral

Location
- Country: Spain
- Ecclesiastical province: Mérida-Badajoz
- Metropolitan: Mérida-Badajoz
- Coordinates: 40°01′41″N 6°05′27″W

Statistics
- Area: 10,000 km^{2} (3,900 sq mi)
- Population: Total; Catholics: (as of 2004); 272,654; 266,724 (97.8%)

Information
- Denomination: Roman Catholic
- Rite: Latin Rite
- Established: 1189
- Cathedral: New Gothic Cathedral of St. Mary in Plasencia

Current leadership
- Pope: Leo XIV
- Bishop elect: Ernesto Jesús Brontóns Tena
- Metropolitan Archbishop: Celso Morga Iruzubieta

Map

Website
- Website of the Diocese

The Diocese of Plasencia (Latin: Dioecesis Placentina in Hispania) is a suffragan Latin diocese of the Catholic Church in the ecclesiastical province of the Metropolitan Archbishop of Mérida-Badajoz, in Extremadura, western Spain.

Its cathedral episcopal see is the Catedral Nueva Gótica de Santa María (Gothic new cathedral), dedicated to the Virgin Mary, in the city of Plasencia, which also has the Romanesque former cathedral Catedral Vieja Románica de San Pablo, dedicated to St. Paul.

== Statistics ==
As per 2015, it pastorally served 261,853 Catholics (95.9% of 273,172 total) on 10,354 km^{2} in 200 parishes with 177 priests (160 diocesan, 17 religious), 360 lay religious (31 brothers, 329 sisters) and 2 seminarians.

== History ==
- Established in 1189 as Diocese of Plasencia / Dioecesis Placentina in Hispania (Latin)

From 1312 to 1326 the bishop Sancho Blázquez Dávila imported the ceremonial and the bureaucratic-administrative model of the royal court into his episcopal household.

== Episcopal ordinaries ==
(all Roman Rite)

Suffragan Bishops of Plasencia

- Bricio (1190–1212)
- Domingo (1212–1232)
- Adán (1234–1262)
- Simón (1263–1268)
- Pedro Fernández (1269–1271), previously Bishop of Astorga (Spain) (1241–1265)
- Pedro El Maestro (1272–1284)
- Juan Alfonso (1285–1290)
- Diego (1290–1295)
- Domingo (1295–1326)
- Juan (1329.08.01 – 1330.10.26)
- Jimeno (1330.10.26 – 1332)
- Benito (1332–1343)
- Sancho (1344.05.12 – 1355.05.12)
- Nicolás (1356.05.16 – 1362)
- Juan Guerra (1364.07.07 – 1372)
- Pedro de Manso (1372.09.03 – 1373)
- Martín (1373 – 1375.10.05)
- Pedro Martínez (1375.10.05 – death 1401.10.18)
- Vicente Arias Balboa (1403.07.30 – death 1414.07.29)
- Gonzalo de Stuñiga o Zúñiga (1415.12.18 – 1422), next Bishop of Jaén (Spain) (1422 – death 1456)
- Diego Badán, Friars Minor (O.F.M.) (1422.10.02 – death 1423), previously Bishop of Badajoz (Spain) (1409.09.11 – 1415.12.18), Bishop of Cartagena (Spain) (1415.12.18 – 1422.10.02)
- Gonzalo de Santa María (1423.07.02 – 1446), previously Bishop of Gerona (Spain) (1419 – 1419), Bishop of Astorga (Spain) (1419 – 1423.07.02); later Bishop of Sigüenza (Spain) (1446 – death 1448.12.12)
- Juan Carvajal (10 August 1446 – death 6 Dec 1469) previously Bishop of Coria (Spain) (1443.10.11 – 1446.08.10 not possessed); created Cardinal-Deacon of Ss. Angeli Custodi a Città Giardino (1446.12.16 – 1446.12.30?), transferred Cardinal-Deacon of S. Lucia in Septisolio (1446.12.30? – 1461.10.26), promoted Cardinal-Bishop of Porto e Santa Rufina (1461.10.26 – 1469.12.06), also still Cardinal-Deacon of S. Lucia in Septisolio in commendam (1461.10.26 – 1469.12.06), Apostolic Administrator of Zamora (Spain) (1467.10.30 – 1468), Camerlengo of Sacred College of Cardinals (1469.01.11 – 1469.12.06)
- Rodrigo de Ávila (29 Jan 1470 – Feb 1492 Died)
- Gutierre Álvarez de Toledo (27 June 1496 – 28 August 1506) ?? Appointed Archbishop of Sevilla)
  - Auxiliary bishop Miguel Alviter, Order of Preachers (O.P.) (4 April 1502 – ? death ?), Titular Bishop of Baia (1502.04.04 – ?)
- Gómez de Toledo Solís (22 Dec 1508 – death 1521)
- Bernardino López de Carvajal y Sande (14 Jan 1521 – death 16 Dec 1523), also Latin Patriarch of Jerusalem (1513.06.27 – 1523.02.20), (transferred) Cardinal-Bishop of Suburbicarian Diocese of Ostia–Velletri (1521.07.24 – 1523.12.16), Cardinal Dean of Sacred College of Cardinals (1521.07.24 – 1523.12.16), Apostolic Administrator of Diocese of Foligno (Italy) (1522.09.26 – 1523.02.04); previously Bishop of Astorga (Spain) (1488.08.27 – 1489.01.23), Bishop of Badajoz (Spain) (1489.01.23 – 1493.03.27), Bishop of Cartagena (Spain) (1493.03.27 – 1495.02.20), created Cardinal-Priest of Ss. Marcellino e Pietro (1493.09.23 – 1495.02.02), transferred Cardinal-Priest of S. Croce in Gerusalemme (1495.02.02 – 1507.08.03), Bishop of Sigüenza (Spain) (1495.02.20 – 1511.10.24), Camerlengo of Sacred College of Cardinals (1498.01 – 1499.01.09), Apostolic Administrator of Roman Catholic Diocese of Avellino (Italy) (1503.07.28 – 1505), Apostolic Administrator of Diocese of Frigento (1503.07.28 – 1505), Latin Patriarch of Jerusalem (1503.12.30 – 1511.10.24 – first time), promoted Cardinal-Bishop of Suburbicarian Diocese of Albano (1507.08.03 – 1507.09.17), transferred Cardinal-Bishop of Suburbicarian Diocese of Frascati (1507.09.17 – 1508.09.22), Apostolic Administrator of Archdiocese of Rossano (Italy) (1508.01.10 – 1519.06.20), transferred Cardinal-Bishop of Suburbicarian Diocese of Palestrina (1508.09.22 – 1509.03.28), Cardinal-Bishop of Suburbicarian Diocese of Sabina (1509.03.28 – 1511.10.24), Bishop of Sigüenza (Spain) (1513.06.27 – 1519)

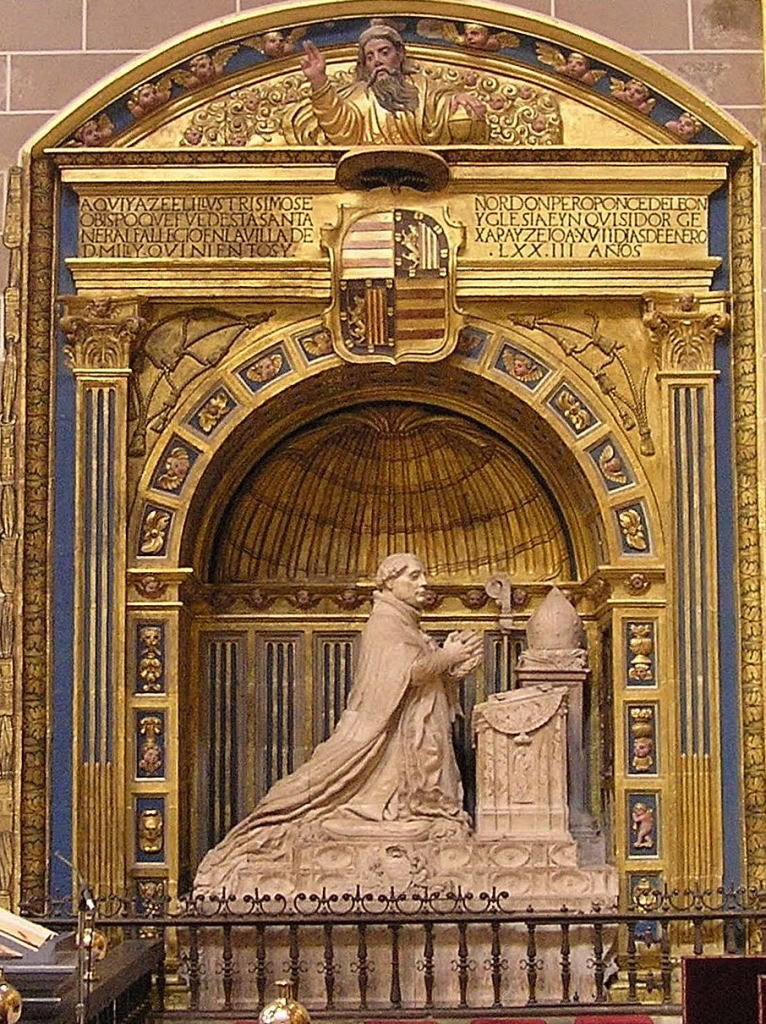
Tomb of Bishop

- Gutierre Vargas de Carvajal (25 May 1524 – death 27 April 1559)
  - Auxiliary bishop Sancho Díaz de Trujillo (9 Sep 1539 – 1546), Titular Bishop of Marocco (1539.09.09 – ?)
- Pedro Ponce de Léon (26 Jan 1560 – death 17 Jan 1573), previously Bishop of Ciudad Rodrigo (Spain) (1550.06.27 – 1560.01.26)
- Martín de Córdoba Mendoza, Order of Preachers (O.P.) (4 June 1574 – 13 June 1578), next Bishop of Córdoba (1578.06.13 – death 1581.06.05); previously Bishop of Tortosa (Spain) (1560.07.17 – 1574.06.04)
- Francisco Tello Sandoval (13 June 1578 – death 8 July 1580), previously Bishop of Osma (Spain) (1567.03.03 – 1578.06.13)
- Andrés de Noronha (11 Sep 1581 – death 3 August 1586), previously Bishop of Portalegre (Portugal) (1560.04.05 – 1581.09.11)
- Juan Ochoa Salazar (7 August 1587 – death 9 March 1594,) previously Bishop of Calahorra y La Calzada (Spain) (1577.09.11 – 1587.08.07)
- Pedro González Acevedo (5 Dec 1594 – death 20 Nov 1609), previously Bishop of Orense (Spain) (1587.07.27 – 1594.12.05)
- Enrique Enríquez de Almansa Manrique, Order of Saint Augustine (O.S.A.) (21 June 1610 – death 22 Jan 1622), previously Bishop of Osma (Spain) (1602.11.15 – 1610.06.21)
- Sancho Dávila Toledo (11 July 1622 – death 6 Dec 1626), previously Bishop of Cartagena (Spain) (1591.04.26 – 1600.01.10), Bishop of Jaén (Spain) (1600.01.10 – 1615.07.20), Bishop of Sigüenza (Spain) (1615.07.20 – 1622.07.11)
  - Auxiliary bishop Jerónimo González (26 Oct 1622 – ? death?), Titular Bishop of Ascalon (1622.10.26 – ?)
- Francisco Hurtado de Mendoza y Ribera (27 Jan 1627 – retired 1630) died 1634; previously Bishop of Salamanca (Spain) (1616.09.05 – 1621.03.17), Bishop of Pamplona (Spain) (1621.03.17 – 1622.11.14), Bishop of Málaga (Spain) (1622.11.14 – 1627.01.27)
- Cristóbal de Lobera y Torres (2 Dec 1630 – death 21 Oct 1632), previously Bishop of Badajoz (Spain) (1615.11.06 – 1618.07.09), Bishop of Osma (Spain) (1618.07.09 – 1623.03.06), Bishop of Pamplona (Spain) (1623.03.06 – 1625.02.19), Bishop of Córdoba (Spain) (1625.02.19 – 1630.12.02)
- Plácido Pacheco de Haro, Order of Saint Benedict (O.S.B.) (18 July 1633 – death 5 Oct 1639), previously Bishop of Cádiz (Spain) (1623.03.20 – 1633.07.18)
- Diego Arce Reinoso (8 Oct 1640 – retired 3 April 1652), died 1665; previously Bishop of Tui (Spain) (1635.10.01 – 1638.03.22), Bishop of Ávila (Spain) (1638.03.22 – 1640.10.08)
- Juan Coello Ribera y Sandoval (11 Dec 1652 – death 1655)
- Francisco Guerra (bishop), O.F.M. (3 April 1656 – death 3 Dec 1657)
- Luis Crespi y Borja, Congregation of the Oratory of Saint Philip Neri (C.O.) (2 Sep 1658 – death 19 April 1663), previously Bishop of Orihuela (Spain) (1651.10.28 – 1658.09.02)
- Alfonso Enríquez de Santo Tomás O.P. (28 Jan 1664 – 15 Sep 1664), next Bishop of Málaga (1664.10.15 – death 1692.07.30); previously Bishop of Osma (Spain) (1662.12.04 – 1664.01.28)
- Diego Riquelme y Quirós (23 Feb 1665 – death 13 May 1668), previously Bishop of Ciudad Rodrigo (Spain) (1658 – 1661), Bishop of Oviedo (Spain) (1661 – 1665.02.23)
- Diego Sarmiento Valladares (17 Sep 1668 – ? resigned 26 April 1677), previously Bishop of Oviedo (Spain) (1668.01.30 – 1668.09.17)
- Archbishop-bishop Juan Lozano (bishop), Order of Saint Augustine (O.S.A.) (26 April 1677 – death 3 July 1679), previously Bishop of Tropea (Italy) (1646.12.17 – 1656.05.29), Bishop of Mazara del Vallo (Italy) (1656.05.29 – 1669.02.04), Metropolitan Archbishop of Palermo (Sicily, Italy) (1669.02.04 – 1677.04.26)
- Juan Álvarez Osorio (1679.11 – death? 1679 not possessed), previously Bishop of León (Spain) (1672 – 1679.11)
- Juan Herrero Jaraba (17 March 1681 – death 27 April 1681), previously Bishop of Badajoz (Spain) (1677.11.08 – 1681.03.17)
- José Jiménez de Samaniego, Order of Friars Minor (O.F.M.) (24 May 1683 – death 14 June 1692)
- Juan de Villacé y Vozmediano (13 April 1693 – death 9 April 1694)
- José González Blázquez, Mercedarians (O. de M.) (24 Jan 1695 – death 9 Dec 1698), previously Bishop of Ciudad Rodrigo (Spain) (1688 – 1695.01.24)
- Bartolomé de Ocampo y Mata (1 June 1699 – death 22 Sep 1703), previously Bishop of Segovia (Spain) (1694 – 1699.06.01)
- José Gregorio de Rojas y Velázquez (7 April 1704 – death 24 Nov 1709), previously Bishop of León (Spain) (1694 – 1704.04.07)
- Bartolomé Cernuda Rico y Piñeros (22 May 1713 – death April 1715)
- Francisco Eustaquio Perea Porras (23 Sep 1715 – 3 July 1720), next Metropolitan Archbishop of Granada (Spain) (1720.07.03 – death 1723.09)
- Juan Montalbán Gómez, Order of Preachers (O.P.) (16 Sep 1720 – death 12 Nov 1720), previously Bishop of Guadix (Spain) (1706.09.13 – 1720.09.16)
- Francisco Laso de la Vega Córdova, O.P. (28 May 1721 – death 14 July 1738) previously Bishop of Ceuta (Spain) (1716.10.05 – 1721.05.28)
- Pedro Manuel Dávila y Cárdenas (19 Dec 1738 – death 25 June 1742), previously Bishop of Islas Canarias (Canaries, insular Spain) (1731.08.06 – 1738.12.19)
- Plácido Bailés (Baylés) y Padilla, Order of Saint Augustine (O.S.A.) (26 Nov 1742 – death 22 Jan 1747), previously Bishop of Huesca (Spain) (1738.03.03 – 1742.11.26)
- Francisco Antonio Bustamante Jiménez (31 July 1747 – death 27 July 1749)
- José Ignacio Rodríguez Cornejo (23 Feb 1750 – death Dec 1755)
- Pedro Gómez de la Torre (24 May 1756 – death 3 August 1759)
- Juan Francisco Manrique Lara (21 April 1760 – death 18 Jan 1765)
- Francisco Antonio de Lorenzana y Butrón (5 June 1765 – 14 April 1766), next Metropolitan Archbishop of México )
- José González Laso Santos de San Pedro (21 July 1766 – death 1803)
- Lorenzo Igual de Soria (16 May 1803 – death 14 Sep 1814)
- Antonio Carrillo Mayoral (10 July 1815 – death 19 March 1826)
- Cipriano Sánchez Varela (3 July 1826 – death 13 March 1848)
- Martino Piña y Giménez (5 Sep 1851 – death 25 Nov 1851)
- José Ávila Lamas (27 Sep 1852 – 25 Sep 1857), next Bishop of Orense)
- Bernardo Conde y Corral, Norbertines (O. Praem.) (21 Dec 1857 – 16 March 1863), next Bishop of Zamora)
- Gregoria María López y Zaragoza (21 Dec 1863 – death 3 May 1869)
- Pedro Casas y Souto (23 Sep 1875 – death 26 July 1906)
- Francisco Jarrín y Moro (6 Dec 1906 – death 3 Nov 1912)
- Manuel Torres y Torres (18 July 1913 – death 4 July 1914)
- Ángel Regueras y López (26 May 1915 – 26 Oct 1923), next Bishop of Salamanca)
- Justo Rivas Fernández (18 Dec 1924 – death 16 July 1930)
- Feliciano Rocha Pizarro (28 Jan 1935 – death 16 August 1945)
- Juan Pedro Zarranz y Pueyo (18 Feb 1946 – death 14 Nov 1973)
- Antonio Vilaplana Molina (17 Sep 1976 – 9 Feb 1987), next Bishop of León)
- Santiago Martínez Acebes (5 Jan 1988 – 30 Oct 1992), next Metropolitan Archbishop of Burgos)
- Carlos López Hernández (15 Mar 1994 – 9 Jan 2003), next Bishop of Salamanca)
- Amadeo Rodríguez Magro (3 Jul 2003 – 9 Apr 2016), next Bishop of Jaén)
- José Luis Retana Gozalo (9 Mar 2017 – 15 Nov 2021), next Bishop of Salamanca and Ciudad Rodrigo)
- Ernesto Jesús Brontóns Tena (16 Jul 2022 – present)

== See also ==
- List of Catholic dioceses in Spain, Andorra, Ceuta and Gibraltar
- Roman Catholicism in Spain
- History of Plasencia

== Sources and external links ==
- GCatholic.org, with Google map and satellite photo - data for all sections
- Diocese website
- Catholic Hierarchy
