= Pedro Suárez de Deza =

Spanish Roman Catholic prelate

Most Reverend Pedro Suárez de Deza
- Bishop of Concepción de la Vega
- Church: Catholic Church
- Diocese: Roman Catholic Diocese of Concepción de la Vega
- Predecessor: None
- Successor: None
- Previous post: Archbishop of Hyaguata

Orders
- Consecration: March 3, 1512 by Diego de Deza

Personal details
- Died: March 17, 1523

Pedro Suárez de Deza (Died March 17, 1523) was a Roman Catholic prelate who served as Bishop of Concepción de la Vega, one of the first three Roman Catholic bishops in the Americas.

On November 15, 1504, Pedro Suárez de Deza was appointed the first and only Archbishop of Hyaguata. The Archdiocese of Hyaguata (located at Santo Domingo) was one three dioceses (the other two being the Diocese of Magua located at Concepción de La Vega and the Diocese of Bayuna located at Lares de Guahaba) created in the New World by a papal bull, Illius fulciti, issued by Pope Julius II. The bull never went into effect due to the objection of Ferdinand II of Aragon, who opposed that the bull gave the dioceses the right to receive a portion of the earnings from the gold and precious stones discovered in the territory. On August 8, 1511, Pope Julius II issued a new papal bull, Pontifax Romanus, which extinguished the previously granted ecclesiastical province and its dioceses and reassigned their delegated bishops. Pedro Suárez de Deza, Bishop Elect of Hyaguata, was reassigned to the Diocese of Concepción de la Vega and on August 15, 1511, he was appointed by Pope Julius II as the Bishop of Concepción de la Vega. On March 3, 1512, he was ordained bishop by Diego de Deza, Archbishop of Sevilla. (His compatriots, Father Alonso Manso, Bishop Elect of Magua, was reassigned to the Diocese of Puerto Rico; and Francisco Garcia de Padilla, Bishop Elect of Bayuna, was reassigned to the Diocese of Santo Domingo). He served as Bishop of Concepción de la Vega until his death on March 17, 1523. He was not replaced as the diocese was suppressed and merged into the Diocese of Santiago de Cuba in 1527.
