= Roman Catholic Diocese of Concepción de la Vega =

Diocese of Concepción de la Vega
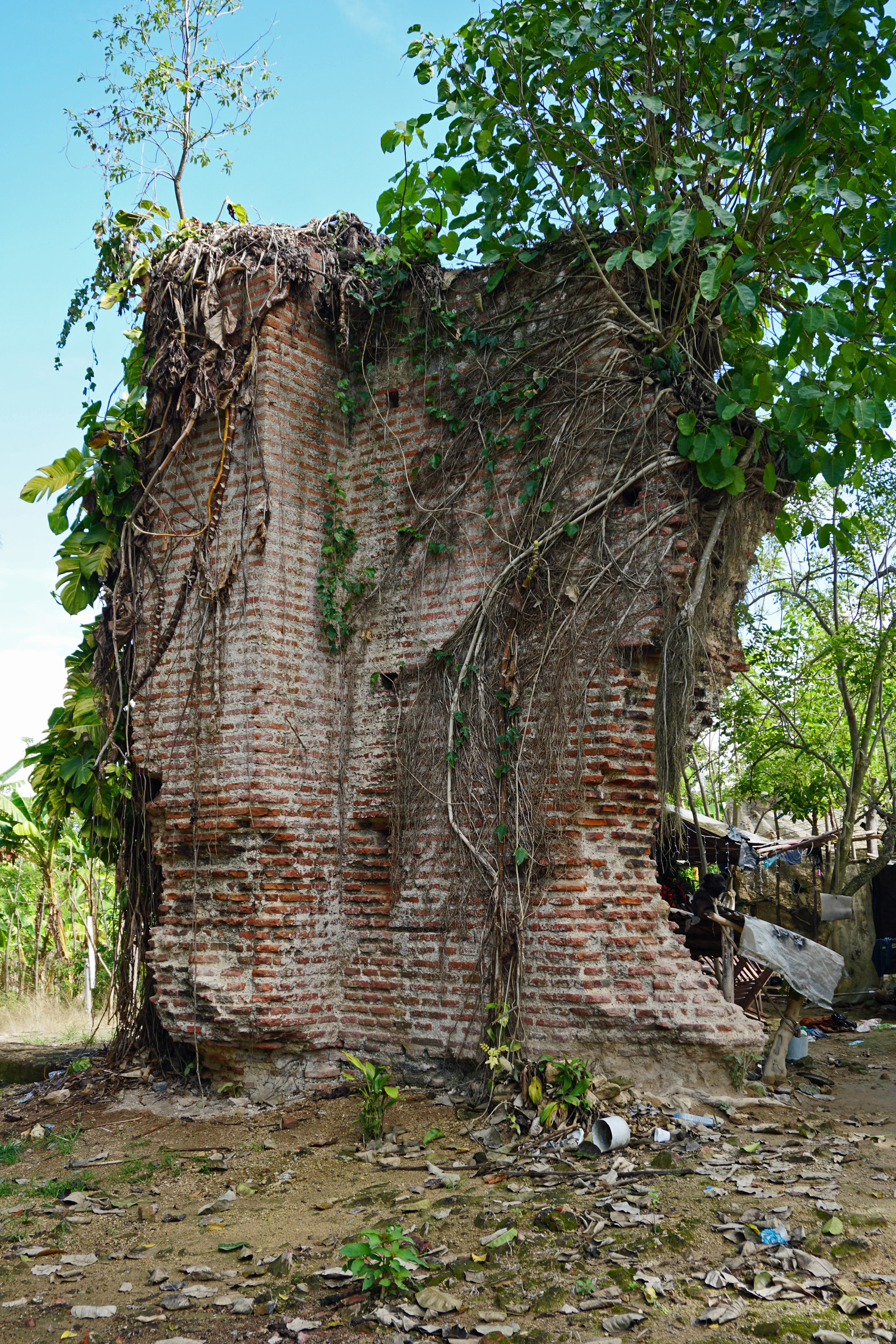

Location
- Country: Dominican Republic
- Metropolitan: Concepción de La Vega

Information
- Denomination: Roman Catholic
- Rite: Latin Rite
- Established: August 8, 1511 (suppressed 1527)

The Roman Catholic Diocese of Concepción de la Vega was an ecclesiastical territory or diocese of the Roman Catholic Church in the Caribbean located in Concepción de La Vega. It was established August 8, 1511 and suppressed in 1527 becoming part of the Diocese of Santiago de Cuba.

== History ==
On November 15, 1504, Pope Julius II issued the papal bull Illius fulciti which erected the first ecclesiastical province in the New World consisting of the Archdiocese of Hyaguata (located at Santo Domingo), the Diocese of Magua (located at Concepción de La Vega), and the Diocese of Bayuna (located at Lares de Guahaba). As all the dioceses were located on the island of Hispaniola, the Spanish Crown requested that the Diocese of Bayuna be transferred to Puerto Rico. The Bull never went into effect due to the objection of Ferdinand II of Aragon who opposed that the Bull gave the dioceses the right to receive a portion of the earnings from the gold and precious stones discovered in the territory. On August 8, 1511, Pope Julius II issued a new papal bull Pontifax Romanus which extinguished the previously granted ecclesiastical province and its dioceses and reassigned their delegated bishops. Pedro Suárez de Deza, Bishop Elect of Hyaguata, was reassigned to the Diocese of Concepción de la Vega; Father Alonso Manso, Bishop Elect of Magua, was reassigned to the Diocese of Puerto Rico; and Francisco Garcia de Padilla, Bishop Elect of Bayuna, was reassigned to the Diocese of Santo Domingo.

The Diocese of Concepción de la Vega was canonically erected on August 8, 1511, and was a suffragan diocese of the Archdiocese of Seville. In 1527, the diocese was suppressed and merged into the Diocese of Santiago de Cuba.

== Ordinaries ==
- Pedro Suárez de Deza
