= Rodrigo de Bastidas =

Spanish conquistador

Adelantado Rodrigo de Bastidas
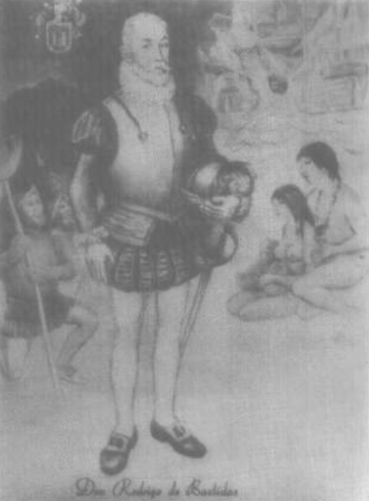
- Rodrigo de Bastidas
- Born: c. 1465; Triana, Sevilla, Kingdom of Seville, Crown of Castile
- Died: 28 July 1527; Santiago de Cuba, Governorate of Cuba, New Spain
- Cause of death: Homicide
- Burial place: Cathedral of Santa María la Menor, Santo Domingo
- Monuments: Santa Marta
- Occupation: Conquistador
- Years active: 1493–1527
- Employer: Spanish Crown
- Known for: Discoverer of Panama; Founder of Santa Marta, Colombia
- Children: Rodrigo de Bastidas y Rodriguez de Romera (son); Isabel de Bastidas y Rodríguez de Romera (daughter)
- Father: Rodrigo de la Bastida

Rodrigo de Bastidas (Spanish pronunciation: [roˈðɾiɣo ðe βasˈtiðas]; c. 1465 – 28 July 1527) was a Spanish conquistador and explorer who mapped the northern coast of South America, discovered Panama, and founded the city of Santa Marta.

== Origins ==
Rodrigo de Bastidas was a well-to-do merchant and mariner from the town of Triana near Seville. Because of a mistake by historian Martín Fernández de Navarrete, Bastidas is still sometimes misrepresented as a notary. He was born around 1465 and married Isabel Rodríguez de Romera sometime before 1500.

== Exploration ==
After sailing with Christopher Columbus during his second voyage to the New World in 1493, de Bastidas petitioned the Spanish Crown to start his own quest to be financed totally with his own money. In exchange for granting de Bastidas the right to explore various territories in the New World, the Crown required him to give them one fourth of the net profits he would acquire. The King and Queen issued a charter that is still preserved in the National Archives in Spain. He sailed to the New World from Cádiz in October 1500 with two ships; the San Antón and the Santa Maria de Gracia. He was accompanied on this voyage by Juan de la Cosa and Vasco Núñez de Balboa.

At the South American coast he sailed westward from Cabo de la Vela, Colombia, in an attempt to explore the coastline of the Caribbean basin. He discovered the mouth of a river he named the Magdalena River and the Gulf of Urabá on the Colombian coast. He reached La Punta de Manzanillo on Panama's upper Caribbean coast before having to abandon his effort. He is acknowledged to be the first European to have claimed that part of the isthmus, and therefore is credited with the discovery of Panama which includes the San Blas region of the indigenous Guna. However, the poor condition of his ships, caused by shipworm that ate the wooden hull, forced him to turn back and head to Santo Domingo to effect repairs. Despite repeated repairs, the ships eventually sank in port at Jacaragua, leaving most of the indigenous slaves to drown, while some gold and pearls were saved. De Bastidas was forced to return overland to Santo Domingo, trading trinkets for food and supplies with Taino natives along the way. On arrival in Santo Domingo he was placed under arrest by Governor Francisco de Bobadilla, and sent back to Spain for allegedly trading with the indigenous people without permission. He was acquitted of these charges by the Spanish Crown, and rewarded with a pension. He returned to Santo Domingo with his family, and became "rich in cattle, at one time possessing 8000 head". In 1504 he undertook another expedition to Tierra Firme, raiding 600 slaves for sale in Hispaniola.

=== Foundation of Santa Marta ===
In 1520 the governorship of Trinidad was granted to de Bastidas, but this was opposed by Diego Columbus, the son of Christopher, and de Bastidas waived the grant. He received instead permission to exploit a region from Cabo de la Vela westward to the Magdalena River; however this expedition was delayed for several years. In 1524 he returned to the New World and accompanied by Juan de Céspedes founded the city of Santa Marta on the Caribbean coast of Colombia. He named the city Santa Marta because it was on Saint Martha's feast day (July 29) that the city was founded.

De Bastidas has been called Spain's Noblest Conquistador because he had a policy of respect, humanity and friendship towards the native people; he maintained pacifistic relations with his neighbors, the native Taganga, Dorsino and Gaira, although it is said he had slaves too. The following quote related to the founding of Santa Marta does not support this appellation:

"I assure you that with the help of God I will enter powerfully against you, and I will make war on you in every place and in every way that I can, and I will subject you to the yoke and obedience of the church and their highnesses, and I will take your persons and your women and your children, and I will make them slaves, and as such I will sell them, and dispose of them as their highnesses command: I will take your goods, and I will do you all the evils and harms which I can, just as to vassals who do not obey and do not want to receive their lord, resist him and contradict him. And I declare that the deaths and harms which arise from this will be your fault, and not that of their highnesses, nor mine, nor of the gentlemen who have come with me here."

On a trip to the interior and the territories of Bonda and Bondigua in present-day Colombia, he traded a substantial amount of gold. De Bastidas had a policy prohibiting his troops from brutally using the indigenous people or robbing them of their goods. His troops, many of whom had gone adventuring in the hopes of obtaining gold, asked de Bastidas for a share. He refused to share it with his men, saying that he needed it to help defray the costs of the colony.

== Death ==
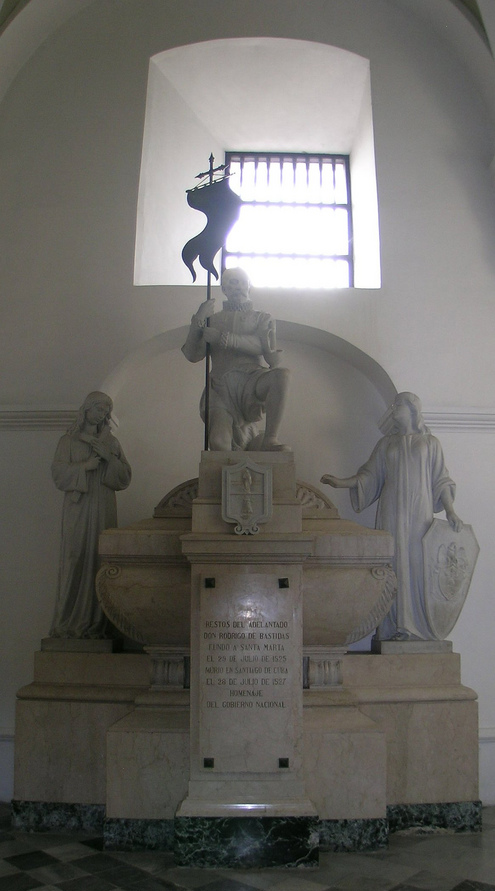
Monument to Rodrigo de Bastidas at the Cathedral of Santa Marta

De Bastidas's refusal to share the gold that he had acquired greatly angered some of his men, among them his lieutenant Villafuerte, who led a conspiracy of some fifty men to murder de Bastidas. One night, while Bastidas was asleep, he was attacked and stabbed five times. He was able to cry out, and his men rushed to his aid. Although seriously wounded, he did not die immediately.

Owing to a lack of adequate medical facilities in Santa Marta, Bastidas attempted to sail to Santo Domingo, but bad weather forced him to land in Cuba, where he died from his injuries. Later, his only son, Archbishop Rodrigo de Bastidas y Rodriguez de Romera, moved his remains to Santo Domingo where he is interred along with his wife, daughter and son at The Cathedral of Santa María la Menor in the Colonial Zone of Santo Domingo, the oldest cathedral in the Americas.

== See also ==
- List of conquistadors in Colombia
- Spanish conquest of the Muisca
- Taganga
- Spanish conquest of the Chibchan Nations
- Juan de Céspedes
