= Alonso Manso =

Roman Catholic bishop

Most Reverend Alonso Manso
- Bishop of Puerto Rico
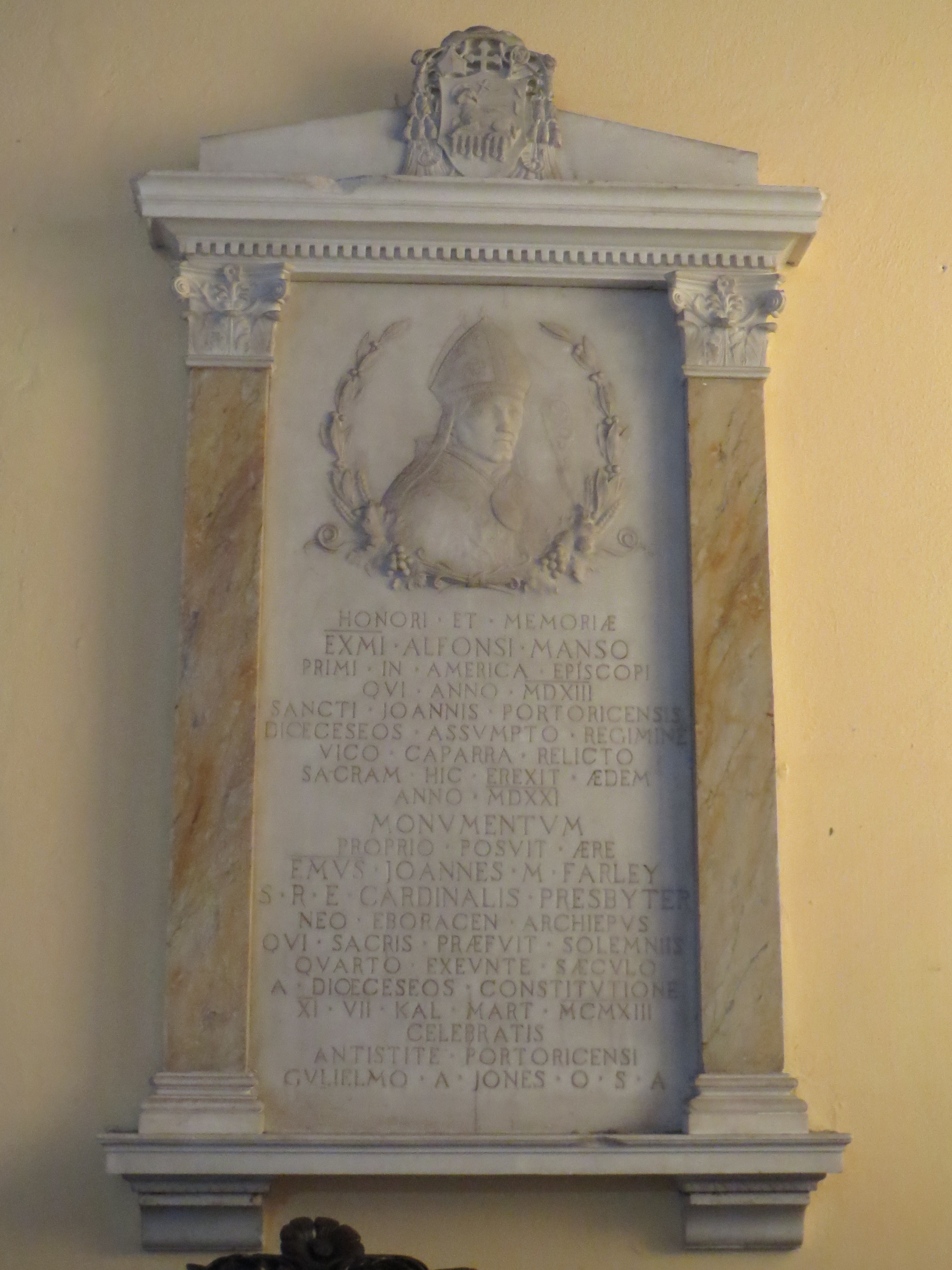
- Church: Catholic Church
- Diocese: Diocese of Puerto Rico
- Predecessor: None
- Successor: Rodrigo de Bastidas y Rodriguez de Romera
- Previous post: Bishop of Magua (1504–1511)

Orders
- Consecration: March 3, 1512 by Diego Labeaga

Personal details
- Born: 1460 Becerril de Campos, Spain
- Died: September 27, 1539 (age 79) San Juan Bautista

Alonso Manso (1460 – September 27, 1539) was a Spanish Catholic prelate who served as the first Bishop of Puerto Rico (1511–1539) and the first Bishop of Magua (1504–1511). He was also Governor of Puerto Rico from 1523 to 1524.

== Biography ==
Alonso Manso was born in Becerril de Campos, Spain and studied theology at the University of Salamanca. He became the canon of Salamanca and the chaplain of the prince Don Juan. On November 15, 1504, he was appointed bishop of Magua, Dominican Republic. On August 8, 1511, Pope Julius II created three dioceses in the New World, two in Hispaniola (Santo Domingo and Concepción de la Vega) and one in Puerto Rico (San Juan), and Manso was appointed bishop of the diocese of Puerto Rico. On March 3, 1512, he was consecrated bishop by Diego de Deza, Archbishop of Sevilla. Before even arriving to Puerto Rico on September 26, 1512, he founded the first school of advanced studies. In 1513, he became the first bishop to arrive in the New World. In 1519, at the request of Bishop Manso the diocese of Puerto Rico was expanded to cover all the Leeward Islands. That same year he was appointed as the first Inquisitor General of the Indies and two years later he directed the construction of the Cathedral of San Juan. However, the cathedral would be completely destroyed by a hurricane in 1539, shortly after his death.

Bishop Manso, as was customary at the time, became involved in politics. He became the eighth governor of Puerto Rico in 1523. However, his stay in power was short lived as he was replaced a year later by Pedro Moreno, the man who, incidentally, he had replaced.

Bishop Manso was the precursor of many acts in the New World. Aside from establishing the first advanced studies school he performed the first episcopal consecration in the New World when in 1529, at the Cathedral of San Juan, he consecrated Sebastián Ramírez de Fuenleal, elected bishop of Santo Domingo. He also founded two hospitals, Concepción (which was the first hospital built in Puerto Rico) and San Ildefonso hospital. Bishop Manso died in San Juan, Puerto Rico, in 1539 at the age of 79. He was succeeded as bishop of Puerto Rico by Rodrigo de Bastidas y Rodriguez de Romera in 1541.

== External links and additional sources ==
- Cheney, David M. "Archdiocese of San Juan de Puerto Rico". Catholic-Hierarchy.org. (for Chronology of Bishops) ^{[self-published]}
- Chow, Gabriel. "Metropolitan Archdiocese of San Juan de Puerto Rico". GCatholic.org. (for Chronology of Bishops) ^{[self-published]}

Catholic Church titles
Preceded by None	Bishop of Magua; 1504–1511	Succeeded by None
Preceded by None	Bishop of Puerto Rico; 1511–1539	Succeeded by Rodrigo de Bastidas y Rodriguez de Romera

Government offices
Preceded by Pedro Moreno	Governor of Puerto Rico; 1523–1524	Succeeded by Pedro Moreno
