= Cathedral of Santo Domingo =

Cathedral Basilica of Santa María la Menor
- Basílica Catedral Menor Nuestra Señora Santa María de la Encarnación o Anunciación (Spanish)
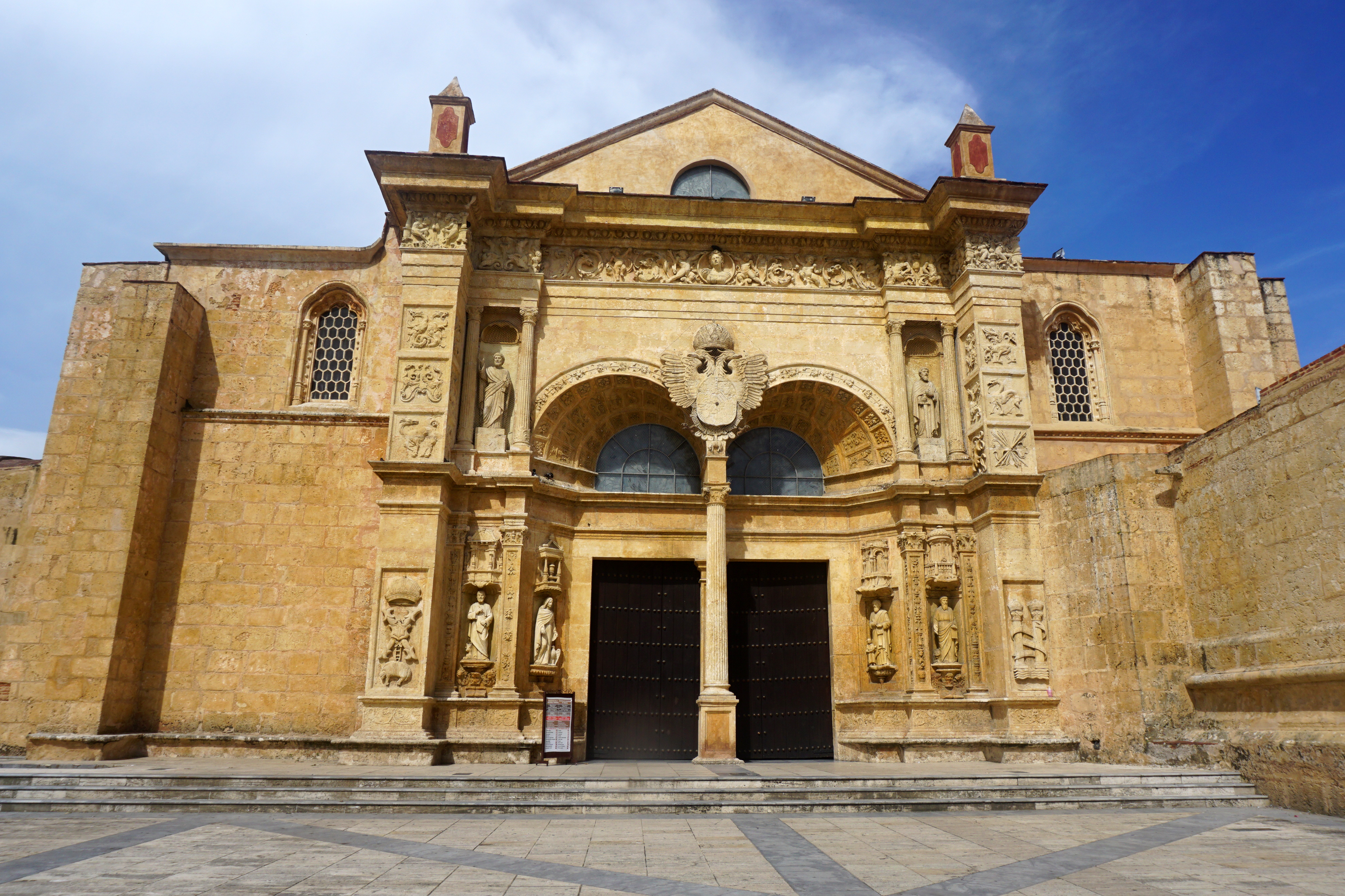
- Front entrance to the Cathedral of Santa María la Menor

Religion
- Affiliation: Catholic
- Province: Archdiocese of Santo Domingo

Location
- Location: Santo Domingo, Dominican Republic
- Interactive map of Cathedral Basilica of Santa María la Menor

Architecture
- Style: Gothic
- Groundbreaking: 1504
- Completed: 1550
- Location within the Dominican Republic

UNESCO World Heritage Site
- Part of: Ciudad Colonial
- Criteria: Cultural: (ii), (iv), (vi)
- Reference: 526
- Inscription: 1990 (14th Session)
- Coordinates: 18°28′22″N 69°53′02″W

The Cathedral of the Americas, Cathedral of Santo Domingo, Cathedral Basilica of Santa María la Menor or Minor Basilica of Santa María de la Encarnación, officially known as the Minor Cathedral Basilica of Our Lady Saint Mary of the Incarnation or Annunciation (Spanish: Basílica Catedral Menor Nuestra Señora Santa María de la Encarnación o Anunciación), in the Colonial City of Santo Domingo is dedicated to St. Mary of the Incarnation. It is the oldest existing cathedral in the Americas, begun in 1504 and was completed in 1550, and the second constructed after the Garðar Cathedral in Greenland. It is the cathedral of the Archbishop of Santo Domingo who has the honorary title of Primate of the Indies because this cathedral was the first diocese and the oldest cathedral established in the New World in the post-Columbus era.

The cathedral is fronted with a golden-tinted coral limestone façade. The building is Gothic, a notable example of real Gothic architecture outside Europe. There is also a treasury which has an excellent art collection of ancient woodcarvings, furnishings, funerary monuments, silver, and jewelry.

It is auspiciously located between Calle Arzobispo Merino and Isabel la Católica, next to Columbus Park in the city of Santo Domingo de Guzmán.

== History ==
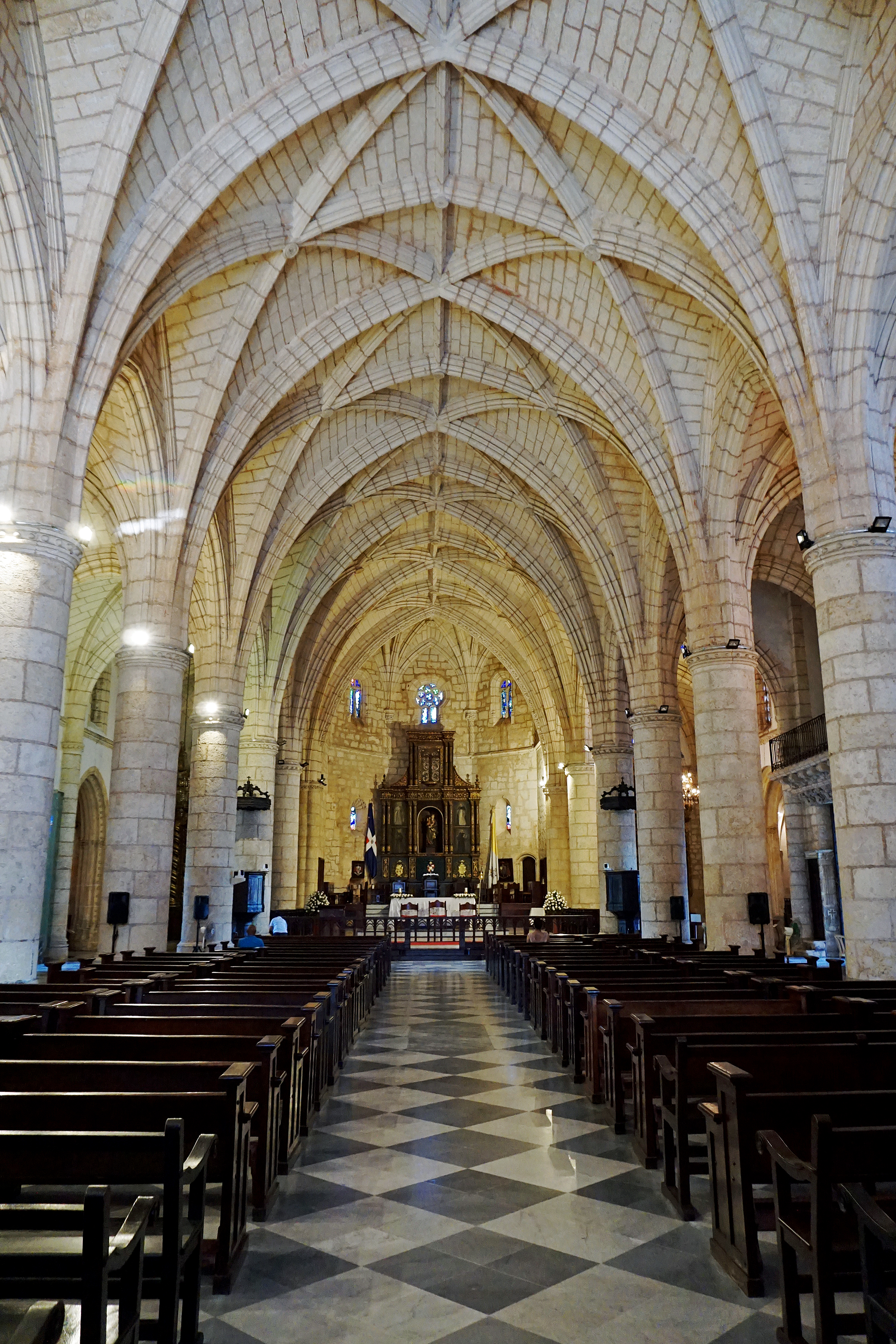
Interior of the First Cathedral of America, highlighting the ribbed vaults

The Cathedral of Santo Domingo is the oldest existing in the Americas, built by order of Pope Julius II in 1504. Headquarters of the Archdiocese of Santo Domingo, its construction began in 1512, under the pastoral government of the first bishop of Santo Domingo, Friar García Padilla, who never came to the island; based on plans by the architect Alonso de Rodríguez.

With the work stopped, they continued with a new design by Luis de Moya and Rodrigo de Liendo in 1522 with the intervention of Bishop Alessandro Geraldini.

Successively Alonso de Fuenmayor, promoted the work and on August 31, 1541, it was consecrated.

In 1546, Pope Paul III elevated it to the rank of Metropolitan Cathedral and Primate of America at the request of King Charles V, Holy Roman Emperor.

In 1547, the work on the bell tower was interrupted, because its height, surpassing the Homage tower, had caused disturbances to the sentinels.

The architect Alonso González, inspired by the Seville Cathedral, partially completed the church in 1550.

In the second half of the 16th century, the Cloister sector was built on the south side, with the cells of the canons; another example is found in the Cathedral of Salamanca in Spain. It was the headquarters of the troops of Sir Francis Drake, who sacked it during his 1586 invasion. Apparently in 1665 there was a second consecration.

Initially without chapels, by 1740 it had nine and currently has 14. The Chapels of Alonso de Suazo, Rodrígo, Bastídas, Geraldini, and Diego Caballero deserve special mention, as well as the crypt of the Archbishops and the lateral Baptismal chapel.

Among the works, the painting of Our Lady of la Antigua was donated by the Admiral. The organ was brought to Magdeburg in 1860.

Another promotion came in 1920 when Pope Benedict XV elevated it to "Minor Basilica of the Virgin of the Annunciation".

== Description ==
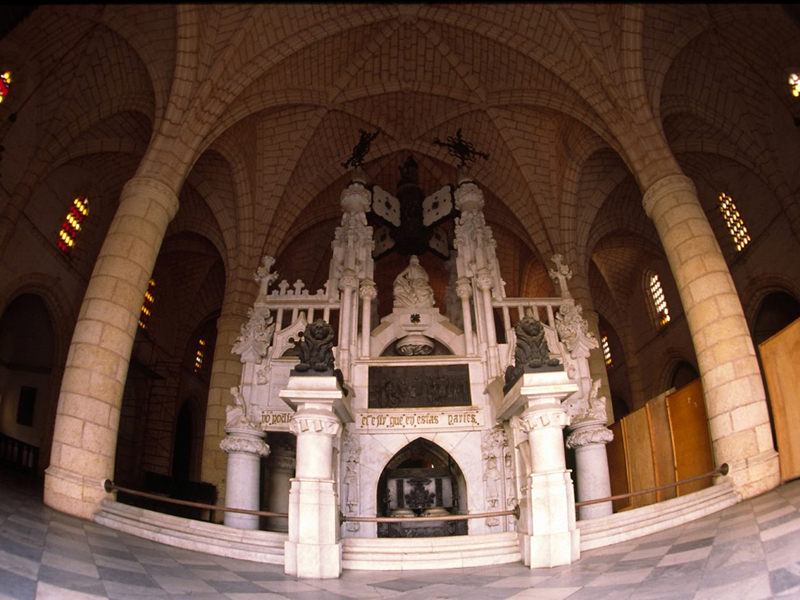
Tomb that housed the remains of Christopher Columbus until 1795.

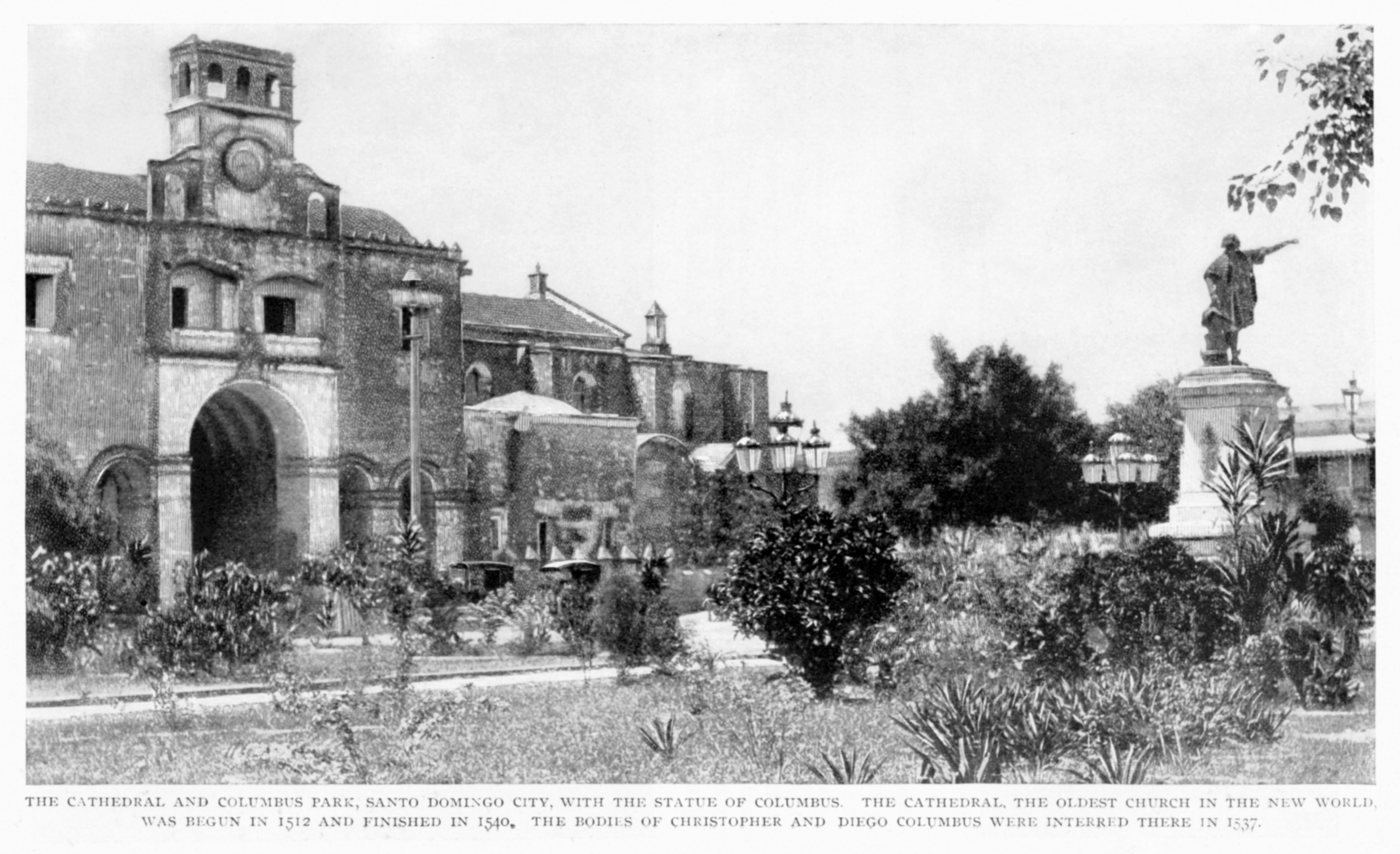
Rear north facade of the Cathedral of Santo Domingo in a photo of 1899.

The architecture of the building of the Cathedral of Santo Domingo is characterized by a Gothic style with ribbed vaults, solid walls and three doors, two of them Gothic in contrast to the third and main of Gothic-Plateresque style.

The cathedral contains a vast artistic treasure made up of altarpieces, paintings (including a panel of the Virgin of la Altagracia dated 1523), old cabinetry, furniture, monuments and tombstones, among other objects. The mausoleums of the archbishops of the colonial period stand out, it is also worth mentioning the tombstone of Simón Bolívar, one of the predecessors of the Liberator.

The remains of Christopher Columbus were housed in the cathedral for a time, which were transferred in 1795 to the Cathedral of Havana and finally, between 1898 and 1899, to the Cathedral of Seville.

The valuable archiepiscopal throne, in the Plateresque style, dates from 1540. It was part of the lower choir, dismantled at the end of the last century to place the marble monument in which the remains of Christopher Columbus were kept.

The cathedral is built with calcareous stone, although some walls are made of masonry and bricks, and it has twelve side chapels, three free naves and a main nave. The roof of the central nave is pitched. Those of the side naves are made up of ribbed vaults that face the outside, as if they were hemispherical domes. The greatest length of the basilica is 54 m from the central nave to the bottom of the presbytery. The width of the three naves is 23 m. The highest height from floor to vault reaches 16 meters, and the built area exceeds 3,000 square meters. Fourteen side chapels were built throughout the cathedral's history.

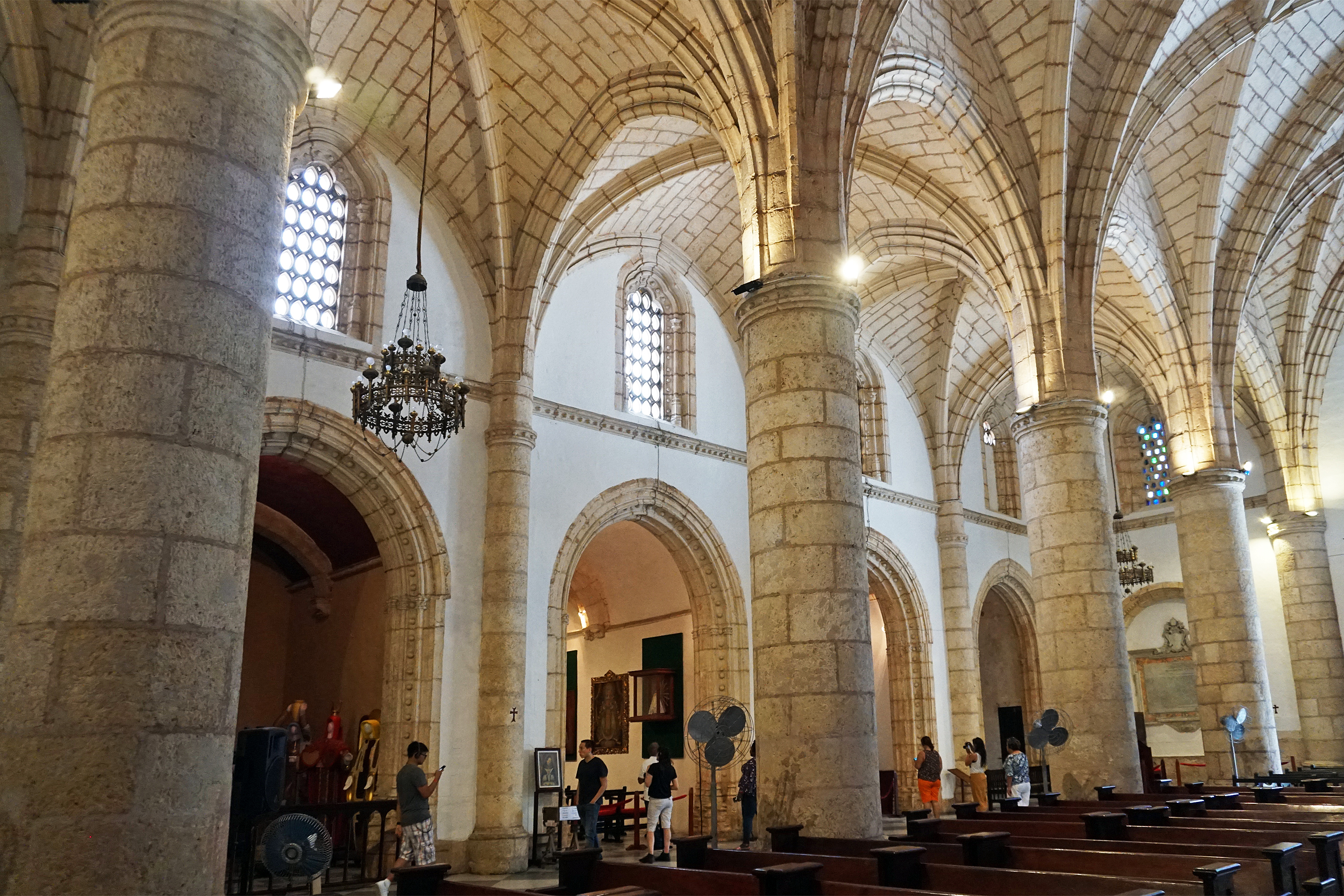
South nave of Santa María la Menor Cathedral.

The surroundings of the cathedral are formulated in three independent spaces, to the north the Plaza de Armas, the battlemented atrium is like an antechamber that marks the main entrance to the religious complex. To the south, the cloister called Plazoleta de los Curas. The annexes around the courtyard allow a passage called Callejón de Curas.

== Notable people buried ==
- Buenaventura Báez – was the president of the Dominican Republic for five nonconsecutive terms.
- Ramón Báez – was a physician and president of the Dominican Republic.
- Fernando Arturo de Meriño – was a Dominican archbishop and served as the president of the Dominican Republic.
- Juan Isidro Jimenes Pereyra – He served as the president of the Dominican Republic.

== Gallery ==
=== Exterior ===
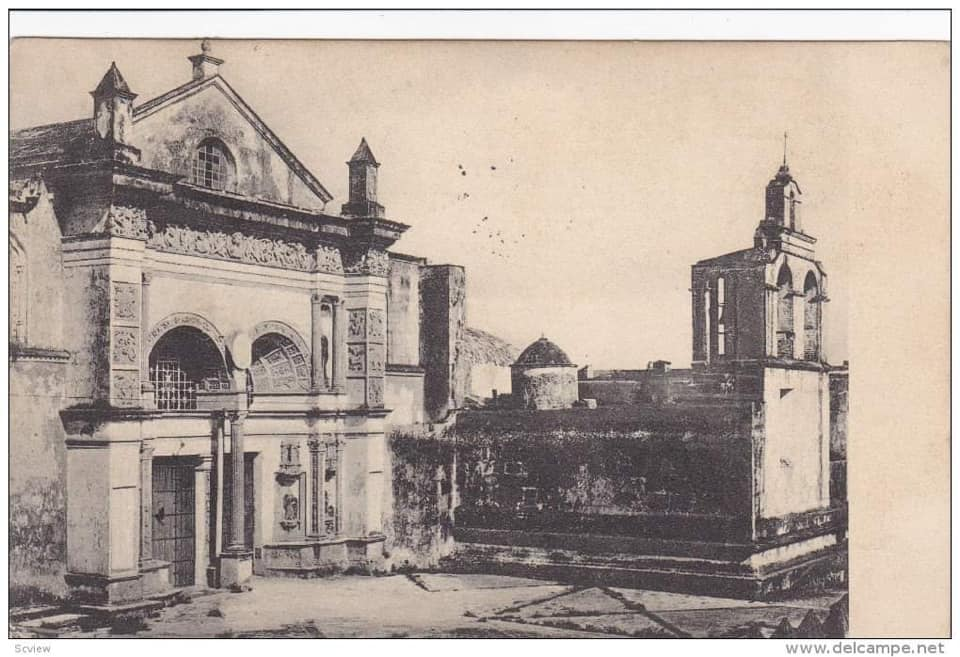
Cathedral of Santo Domingo at the late 19th century.

Coat of arms of the Cathedral of Santo Domingo

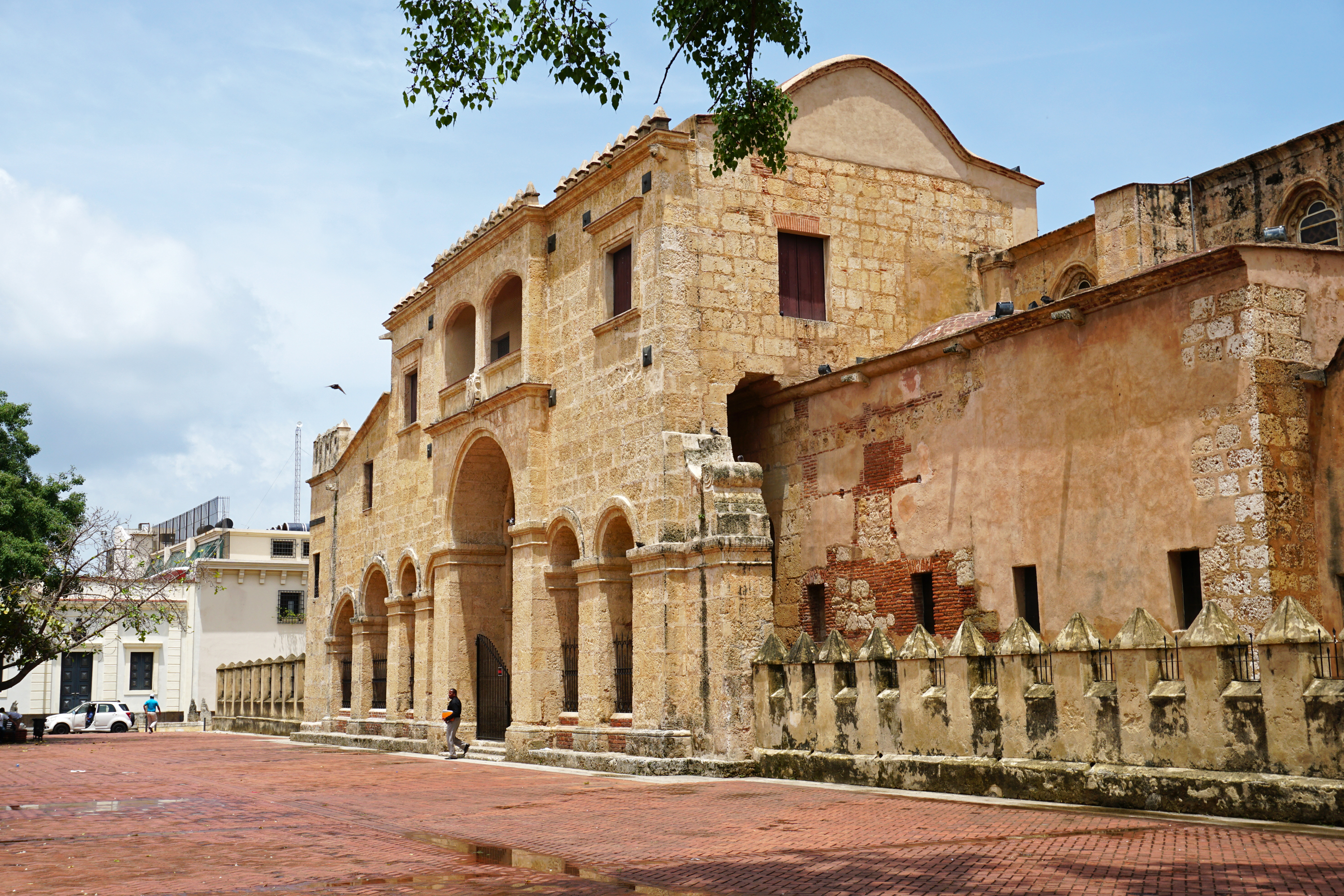
North facade

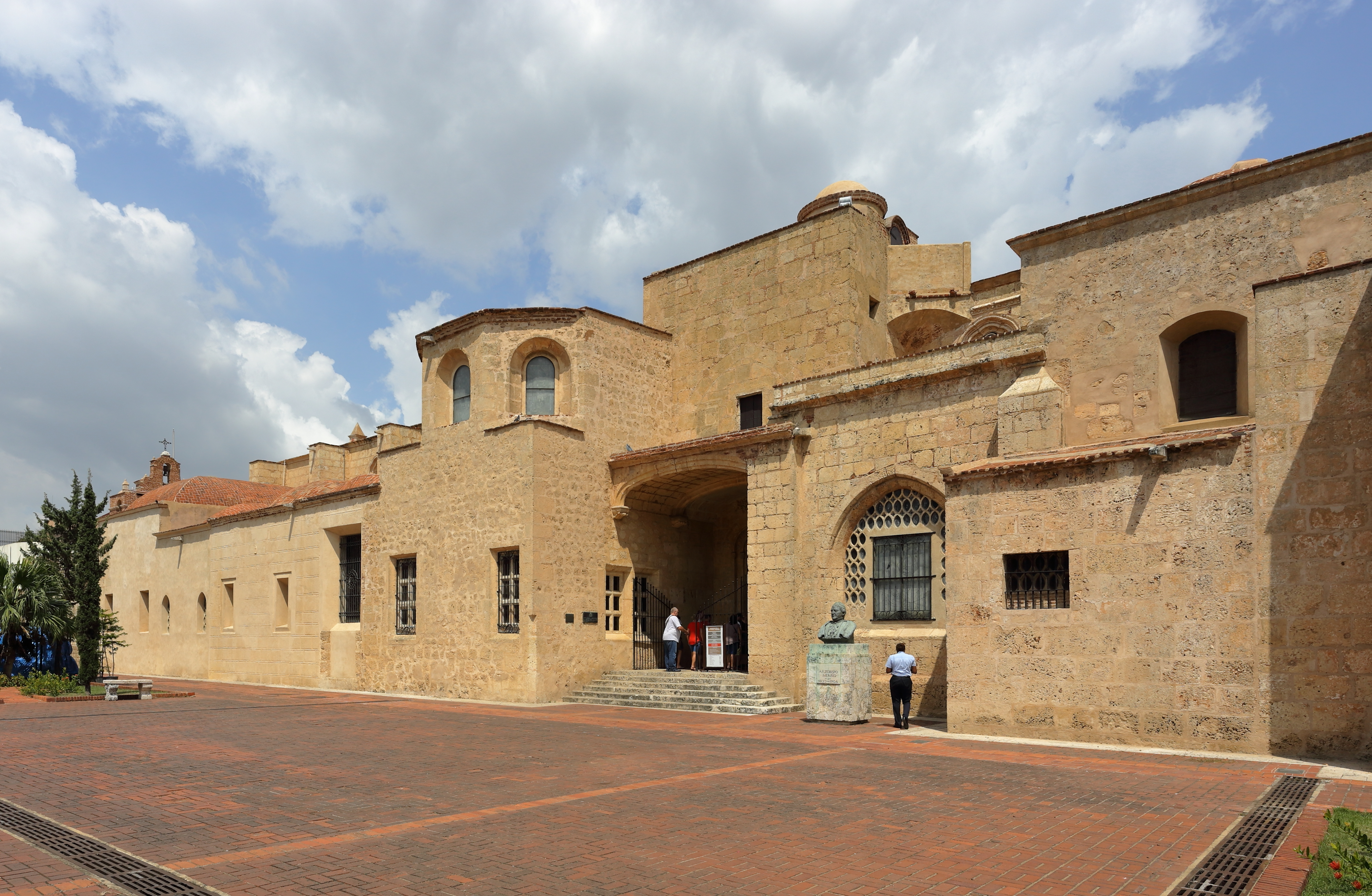
South facade

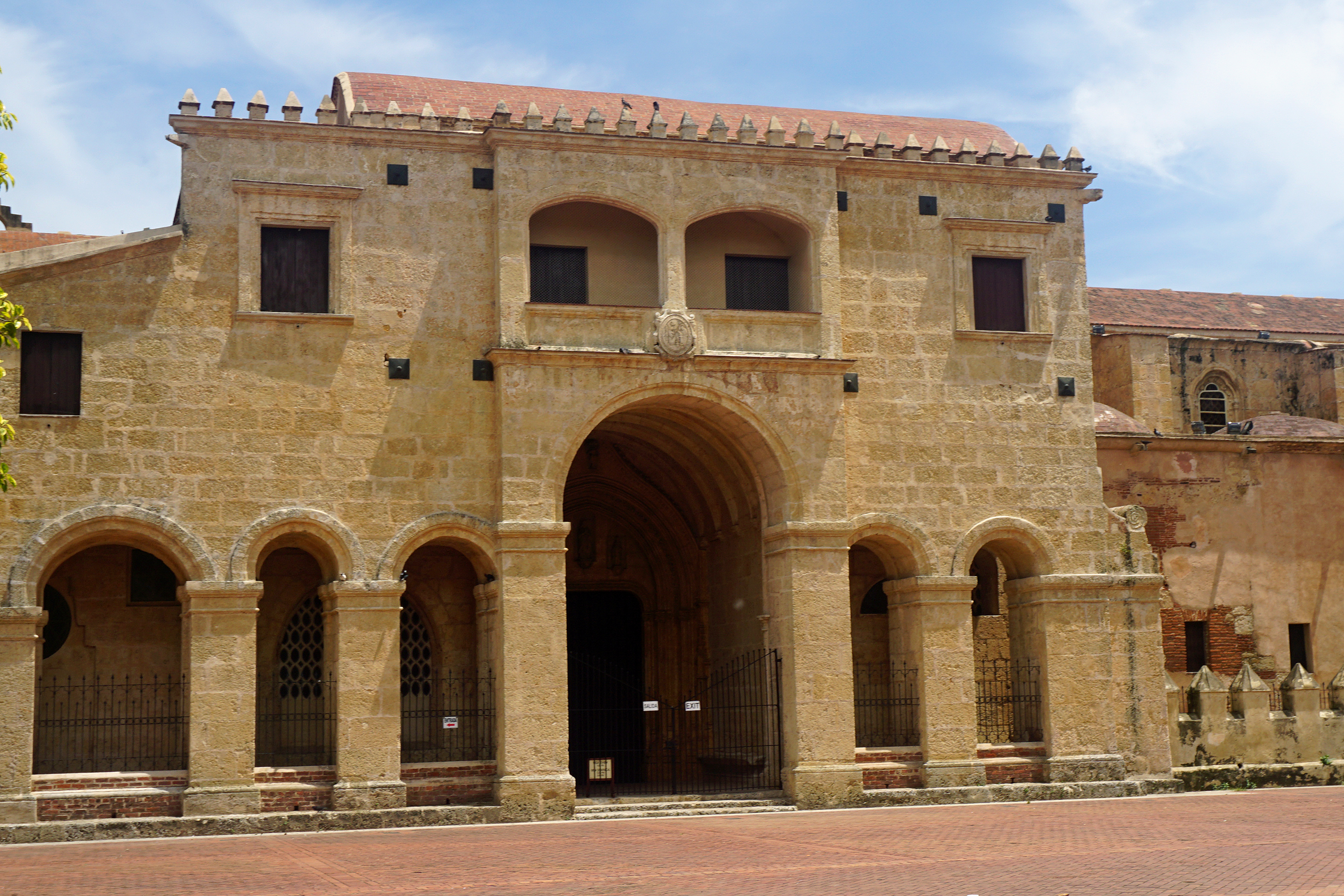
North facade

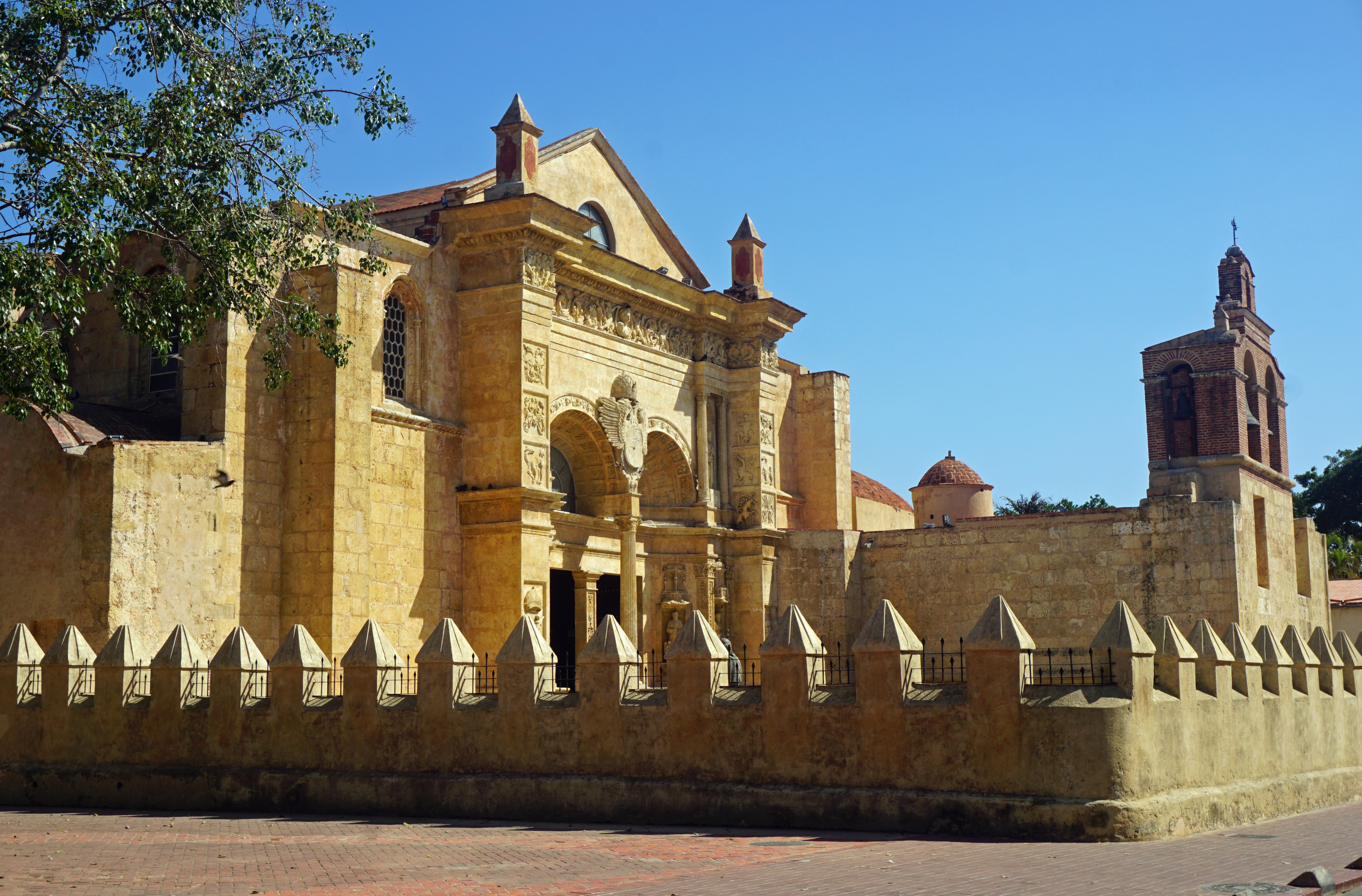
Main entrance
(west facade)

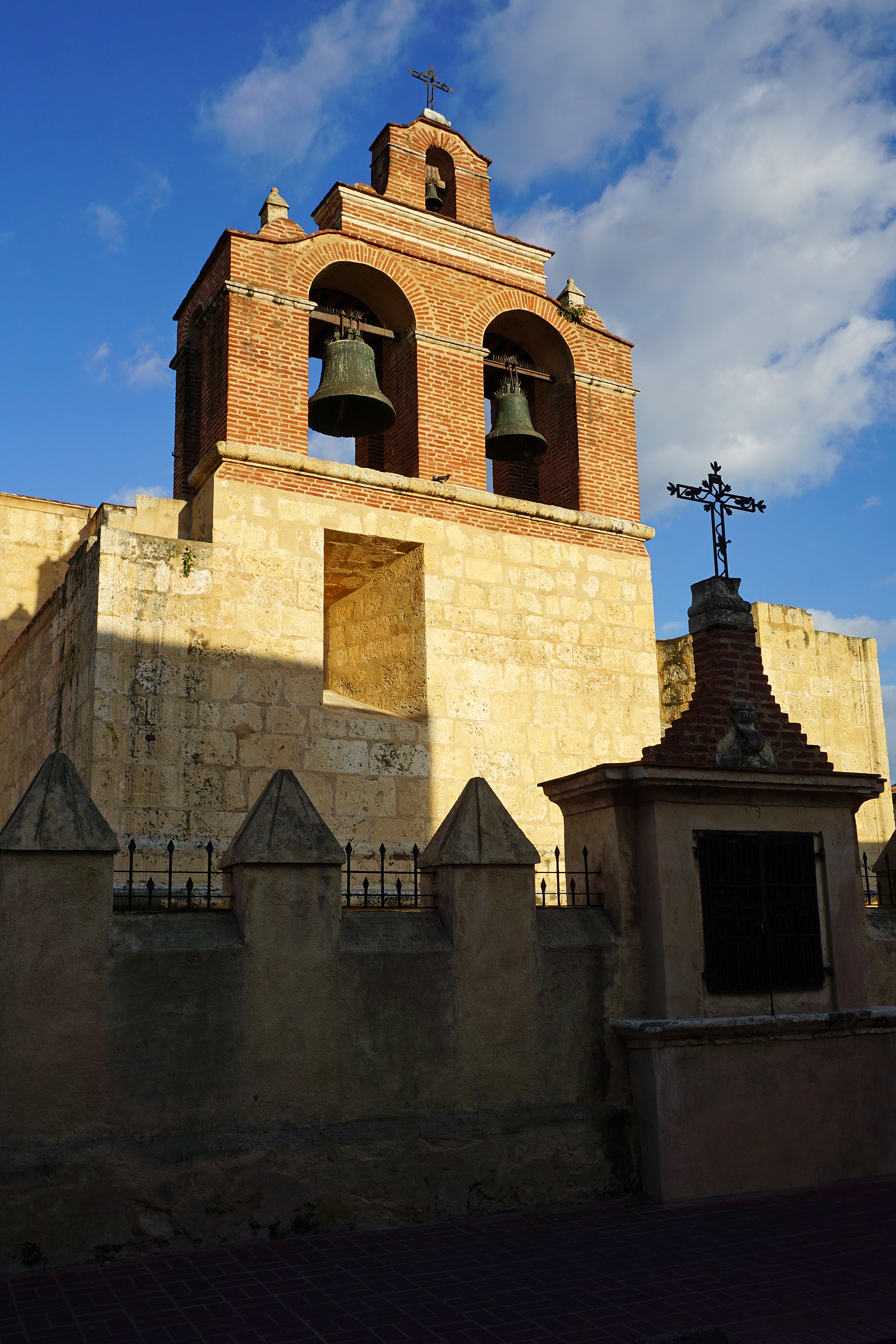
Bell-gable

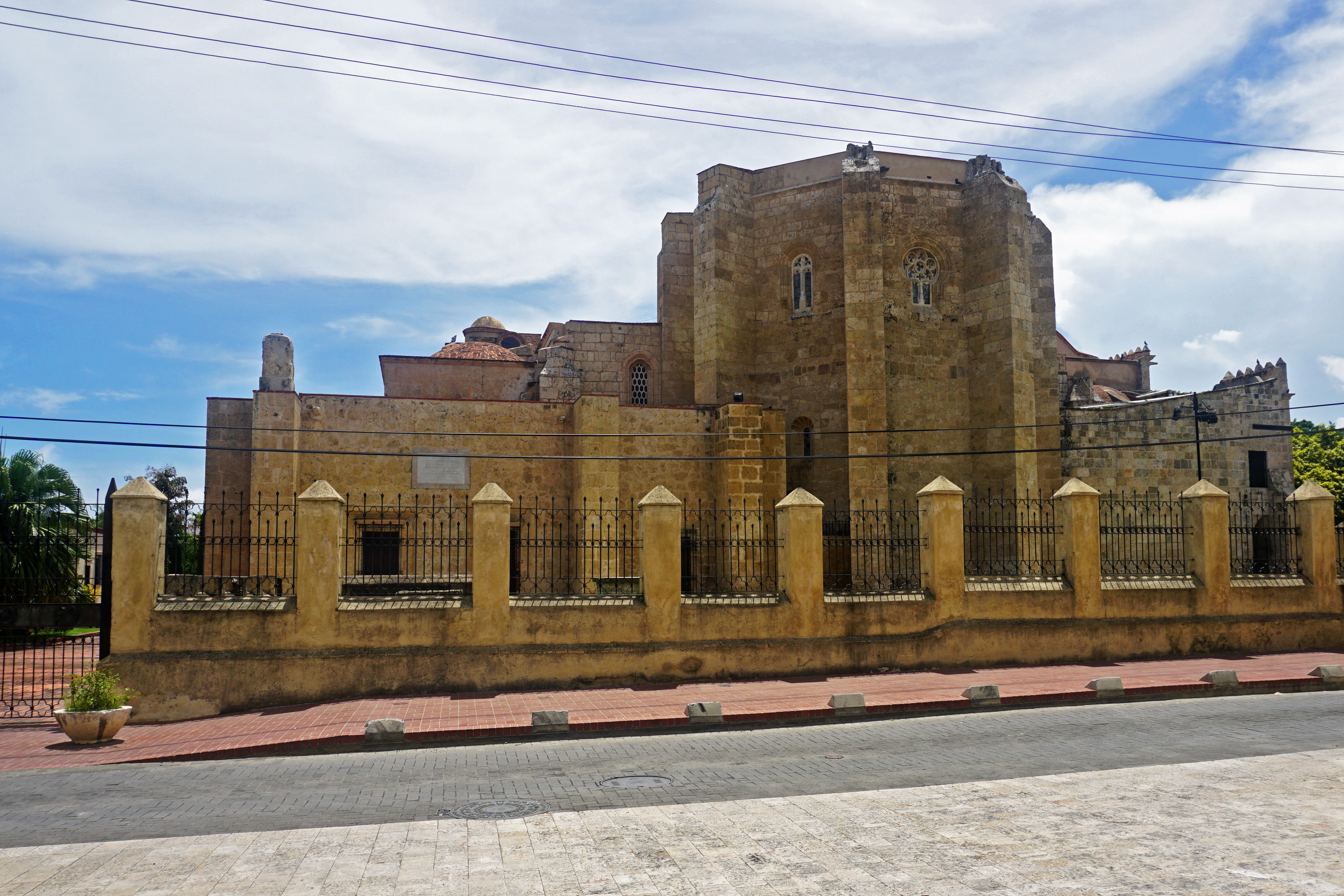
(rear) East facade

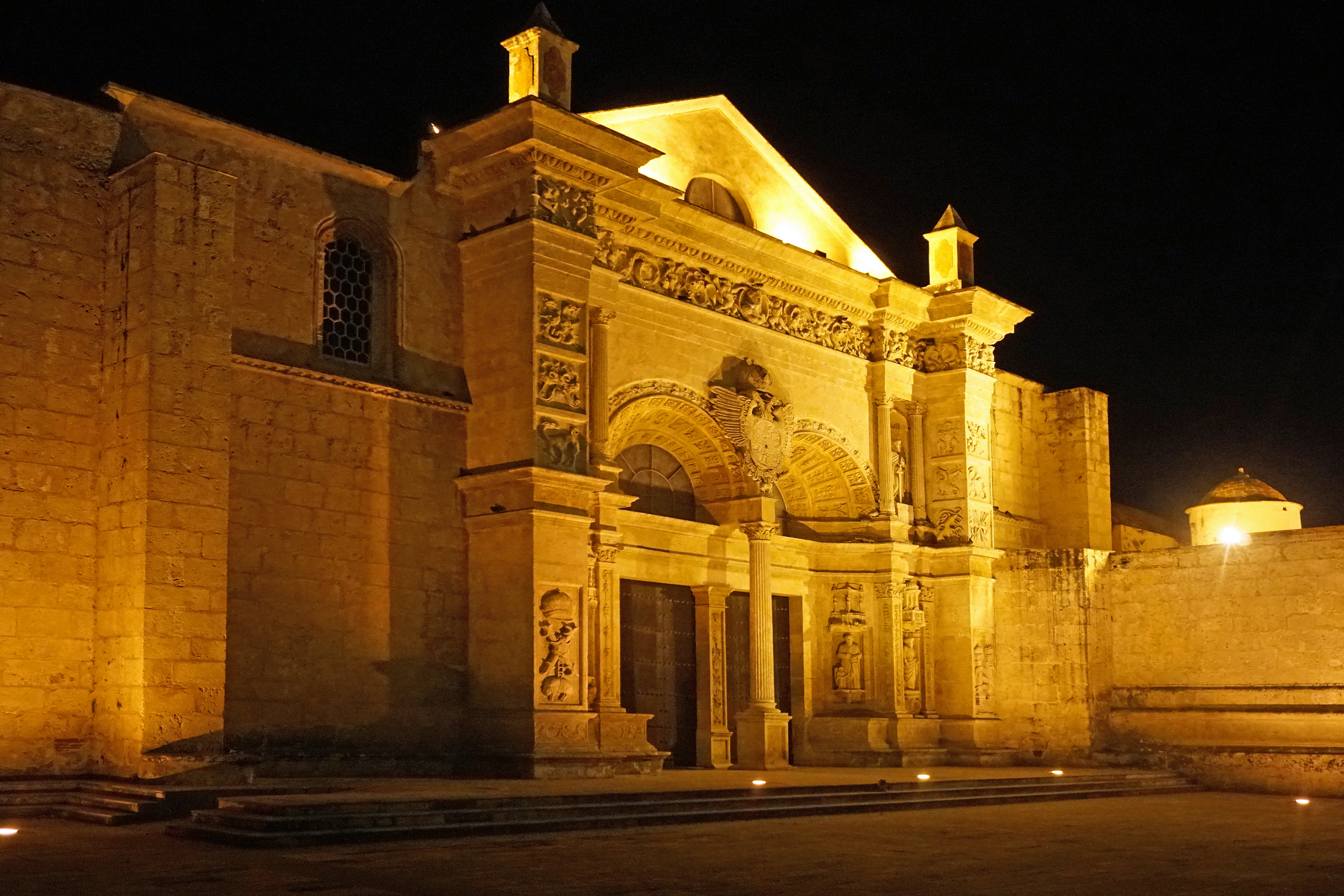
Night view of the main entrance

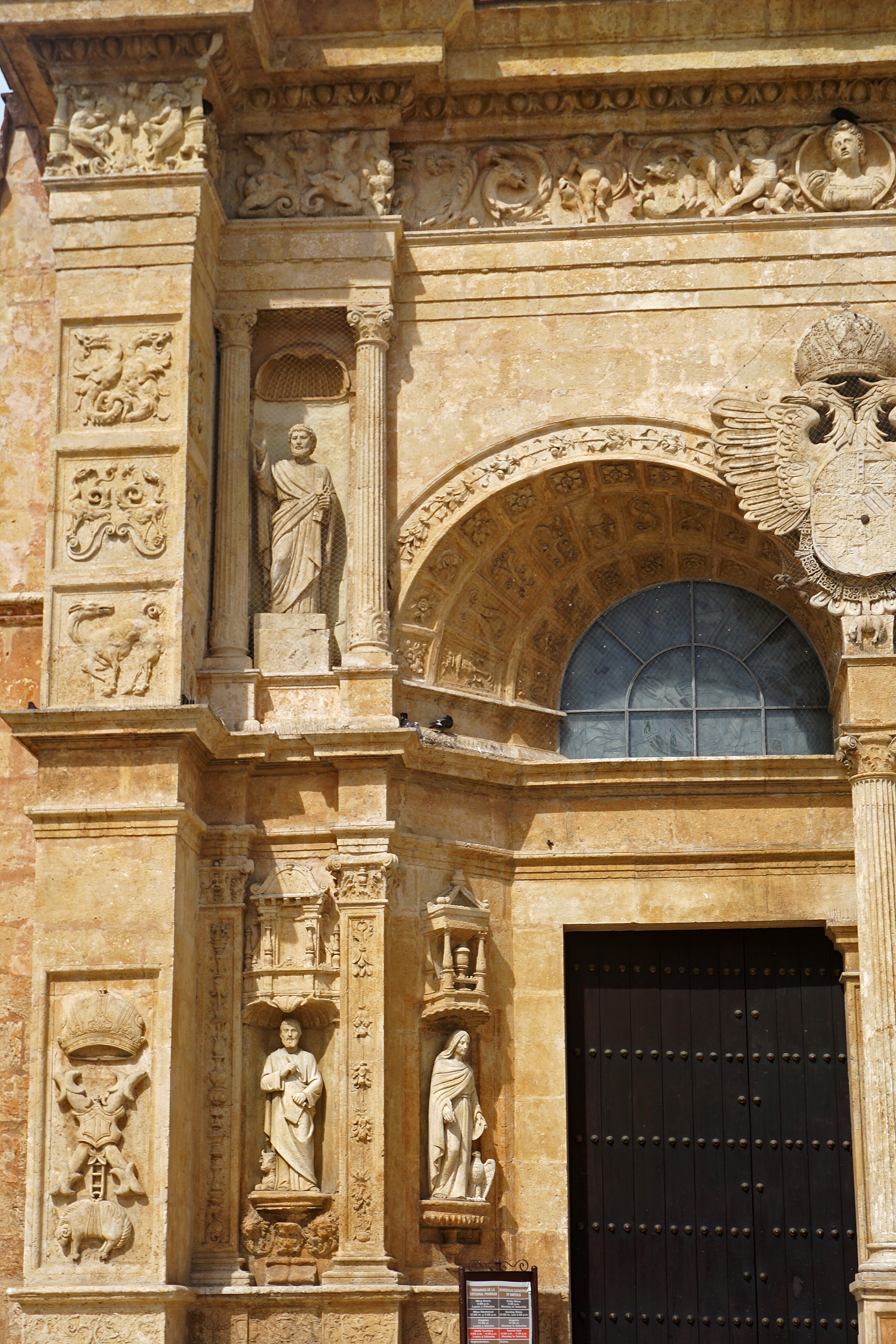

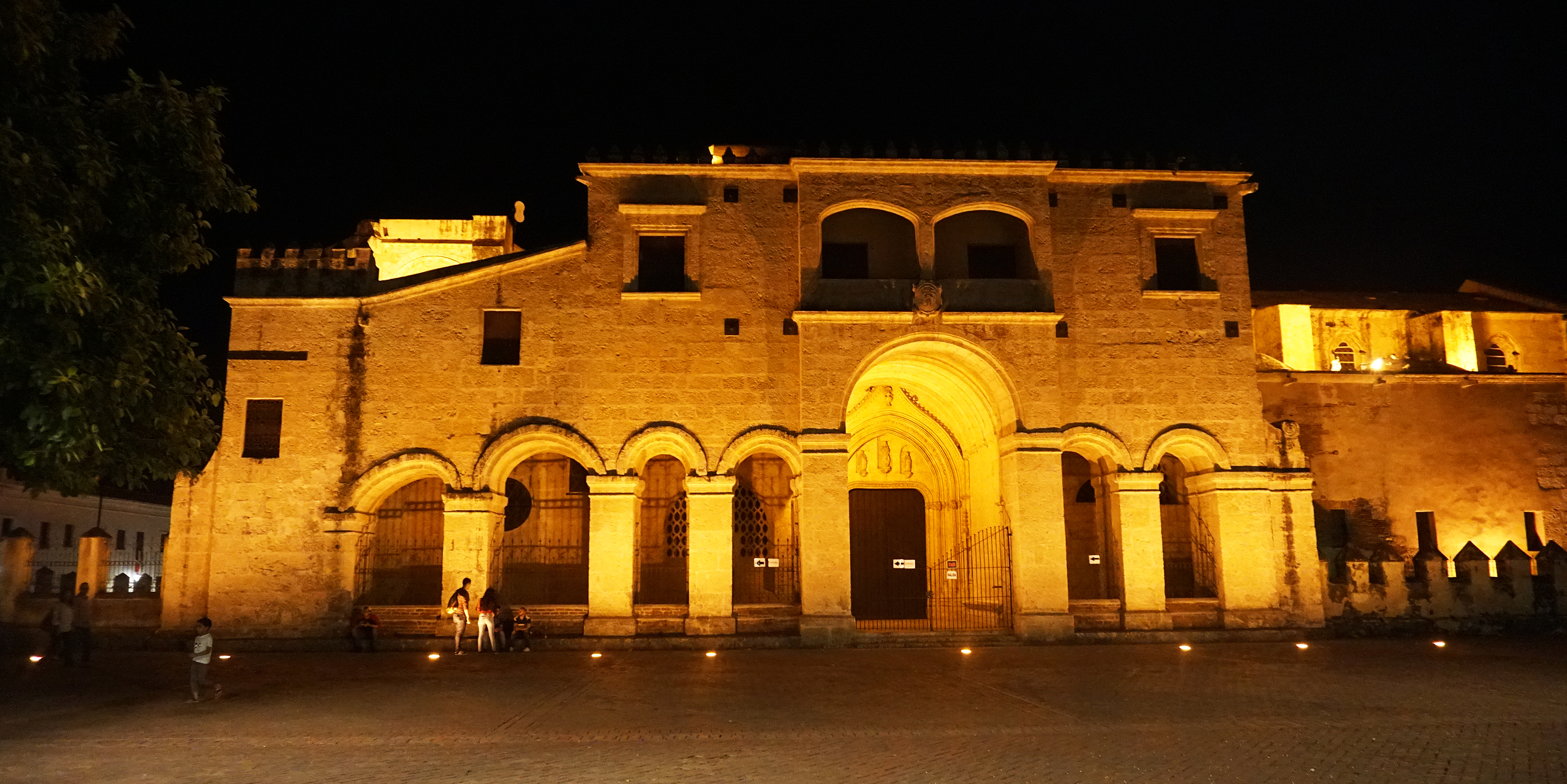

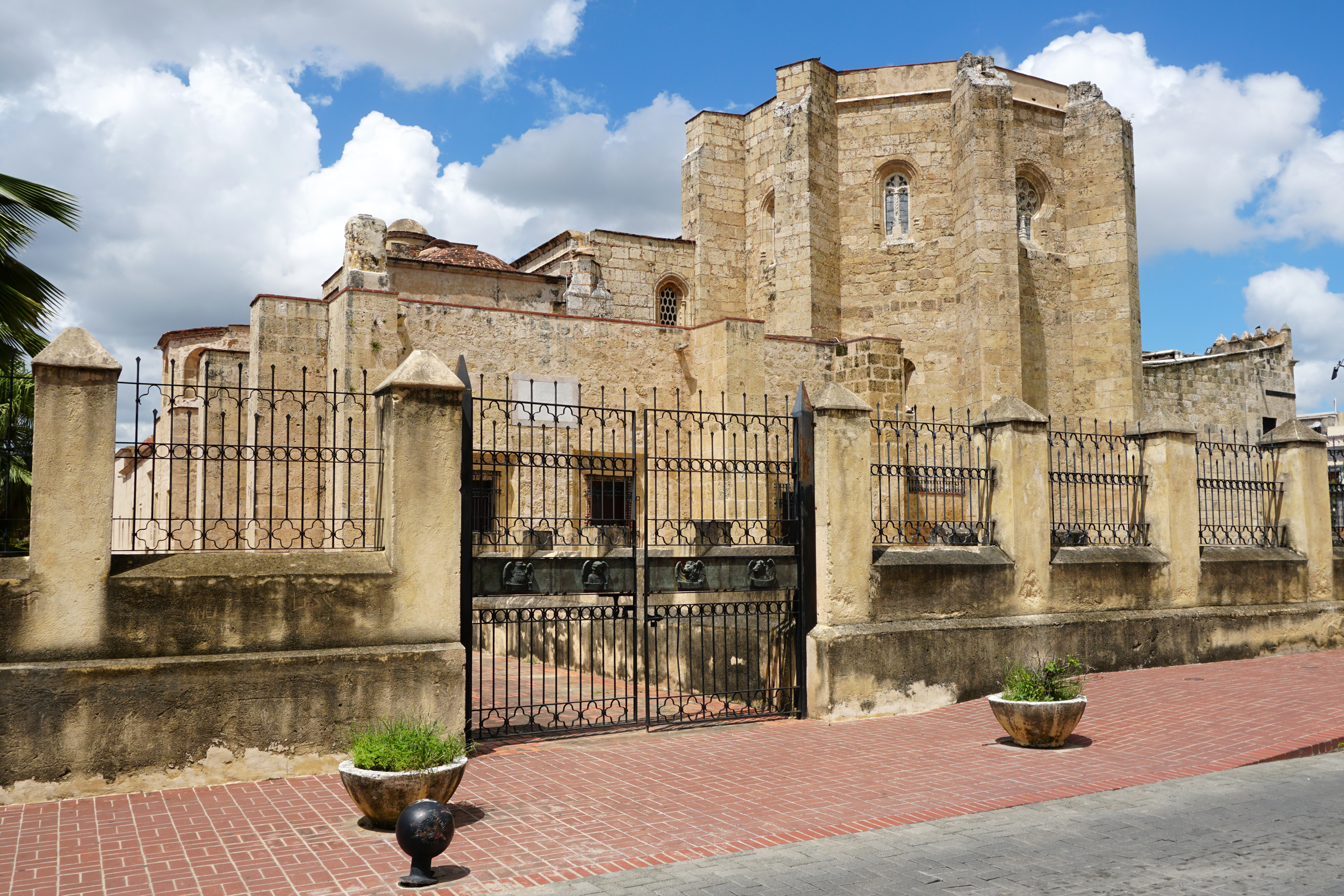

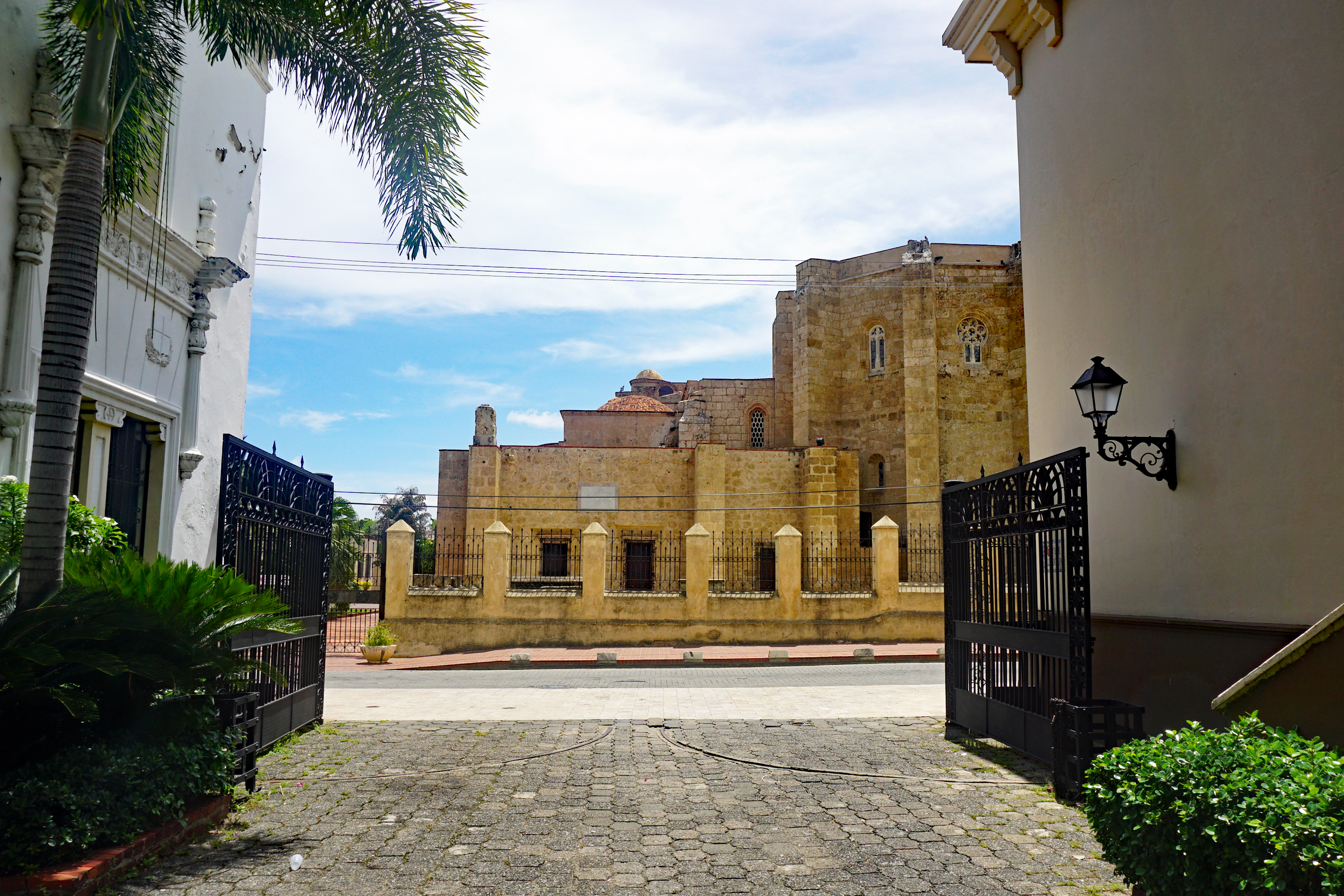

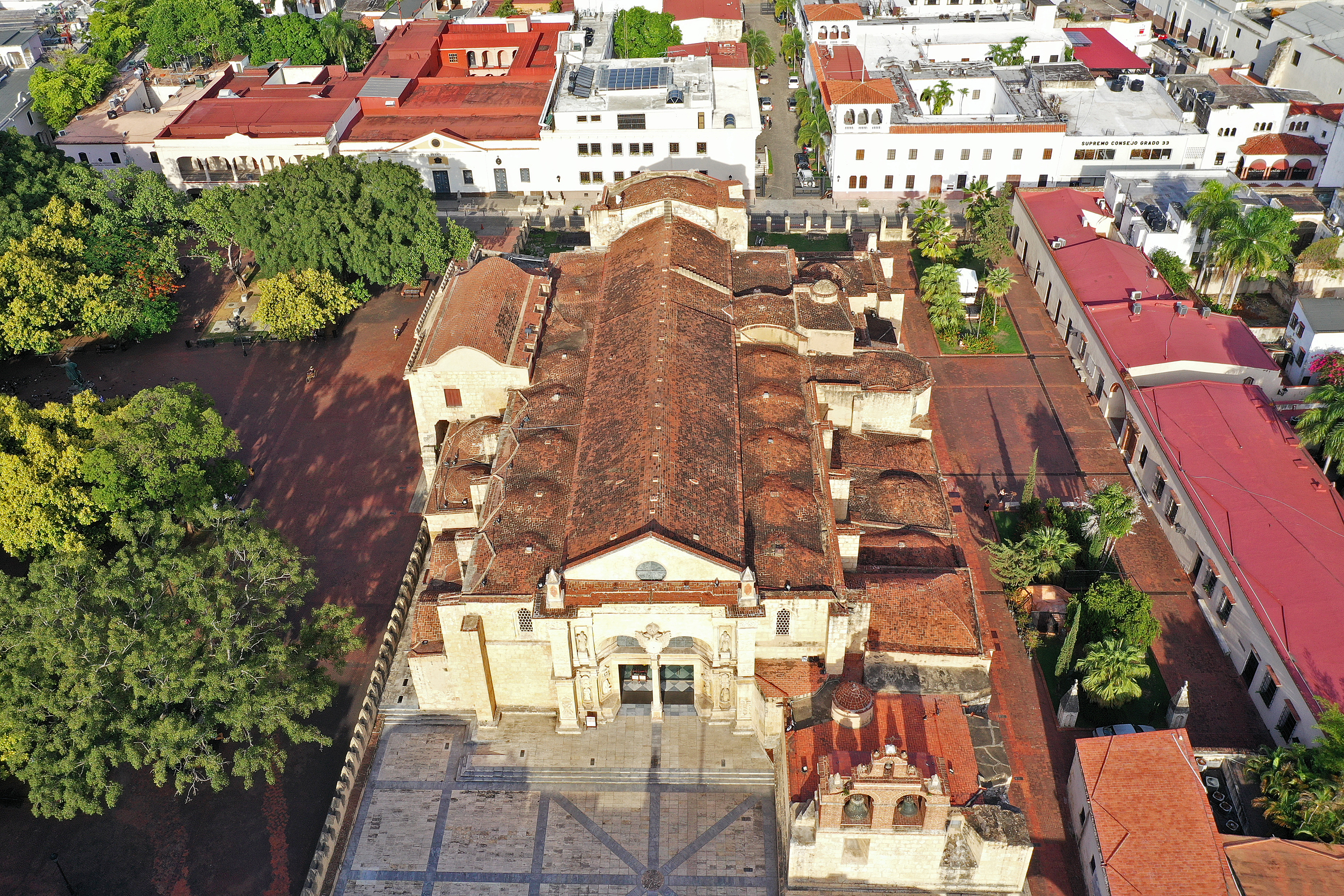
Roof view of cathedral

=== Interior ===
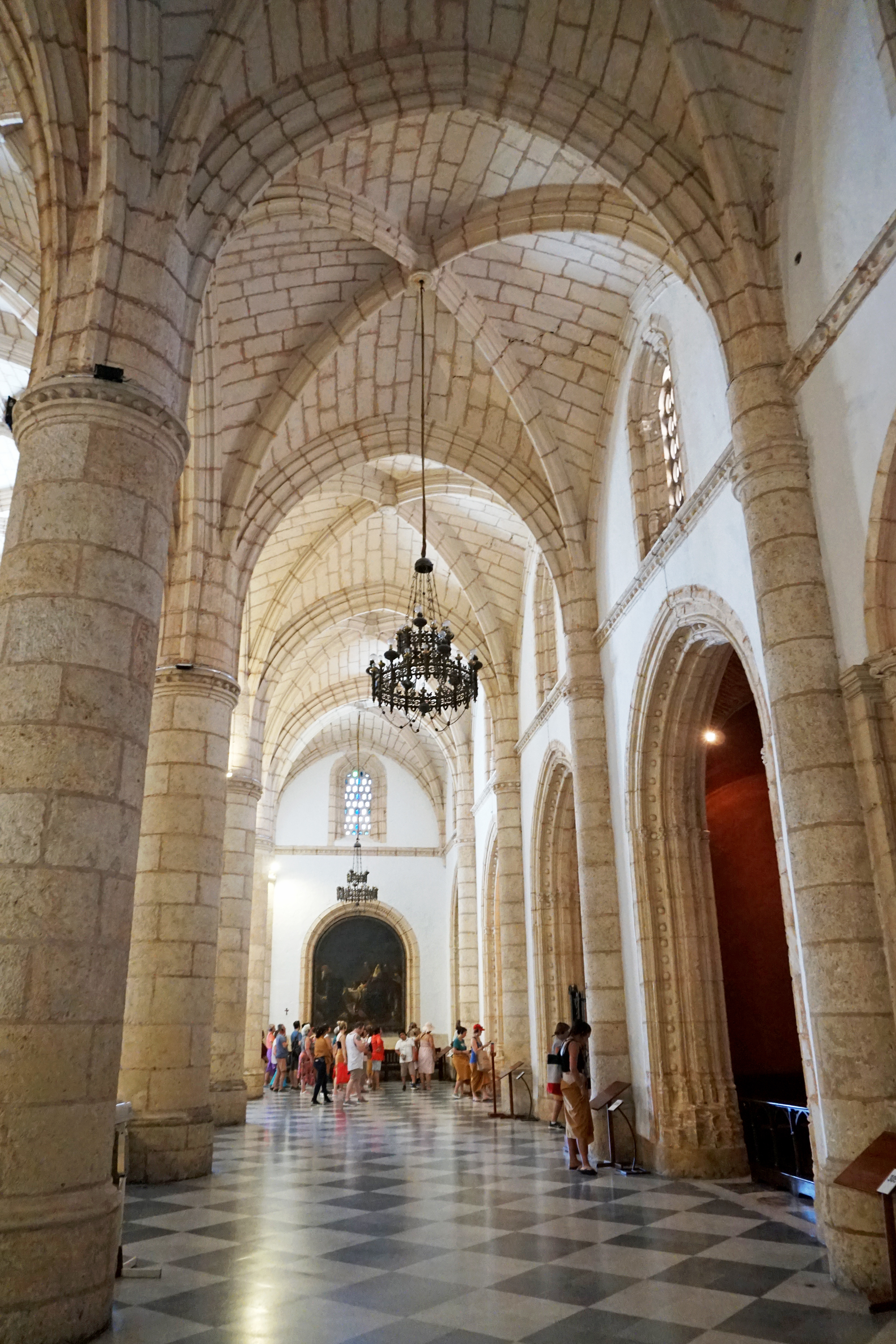
North nave of Santa María la Menor Cathedral.

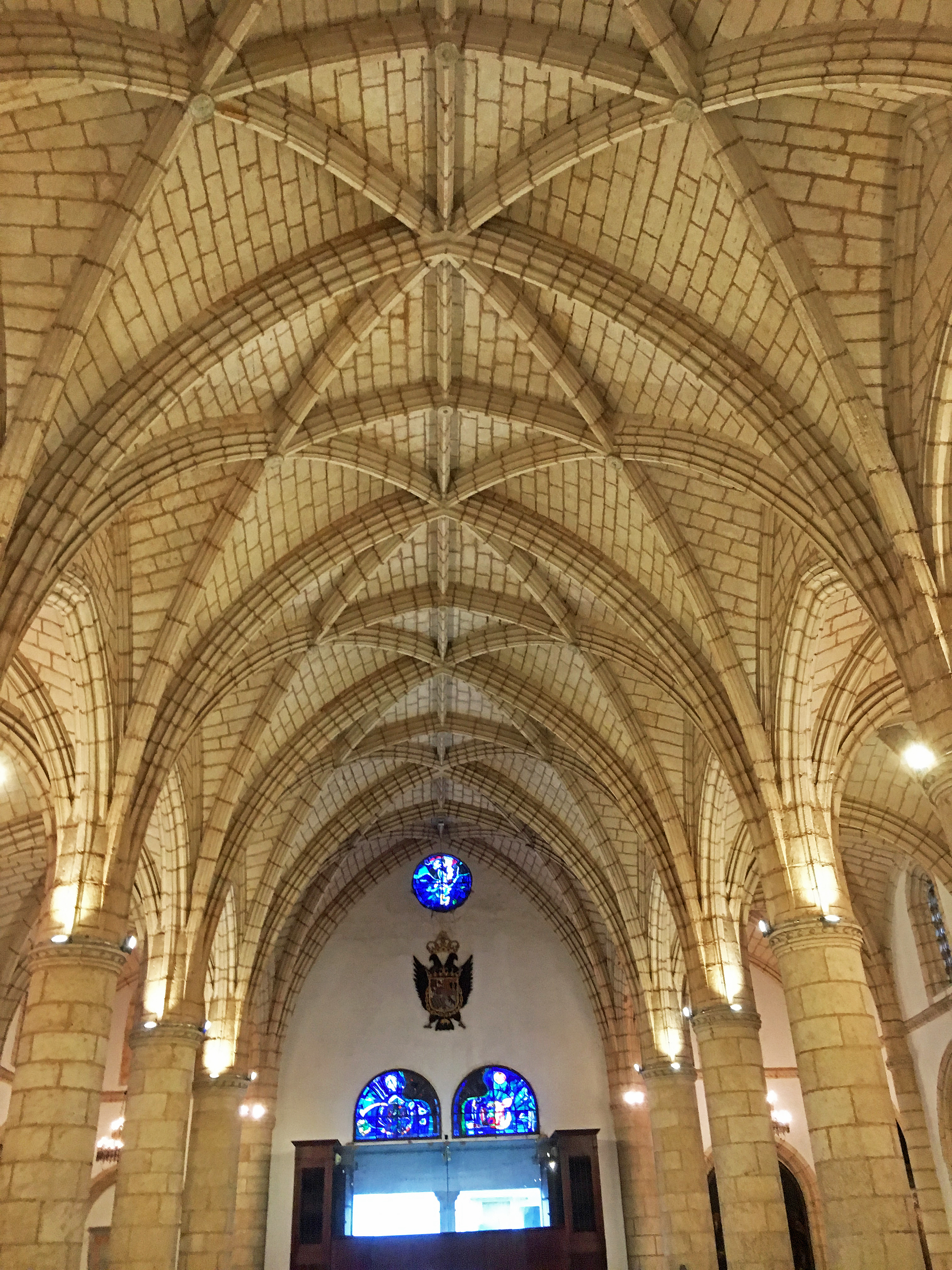
Vaulted ceiling
(rib vault structure)

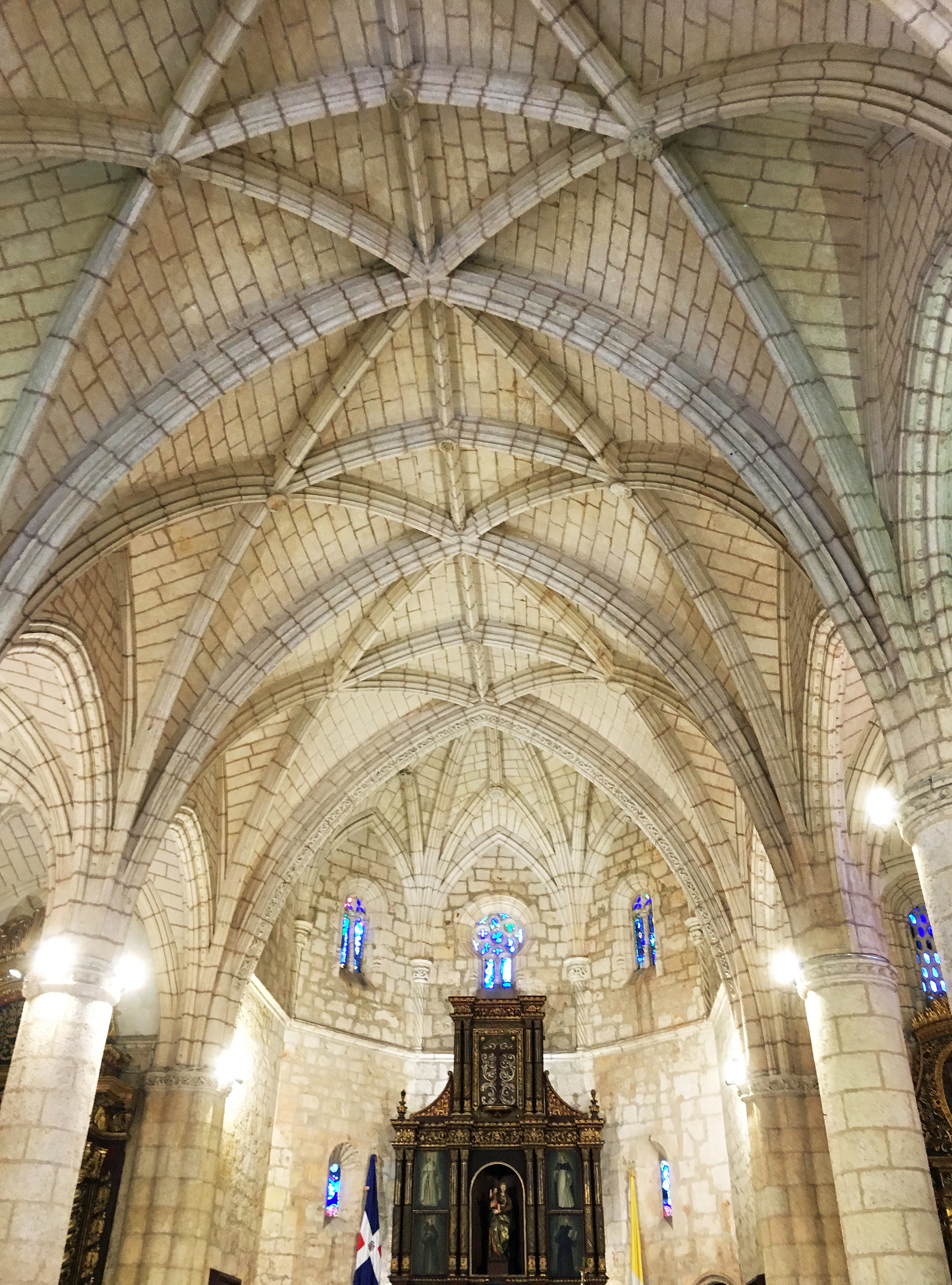

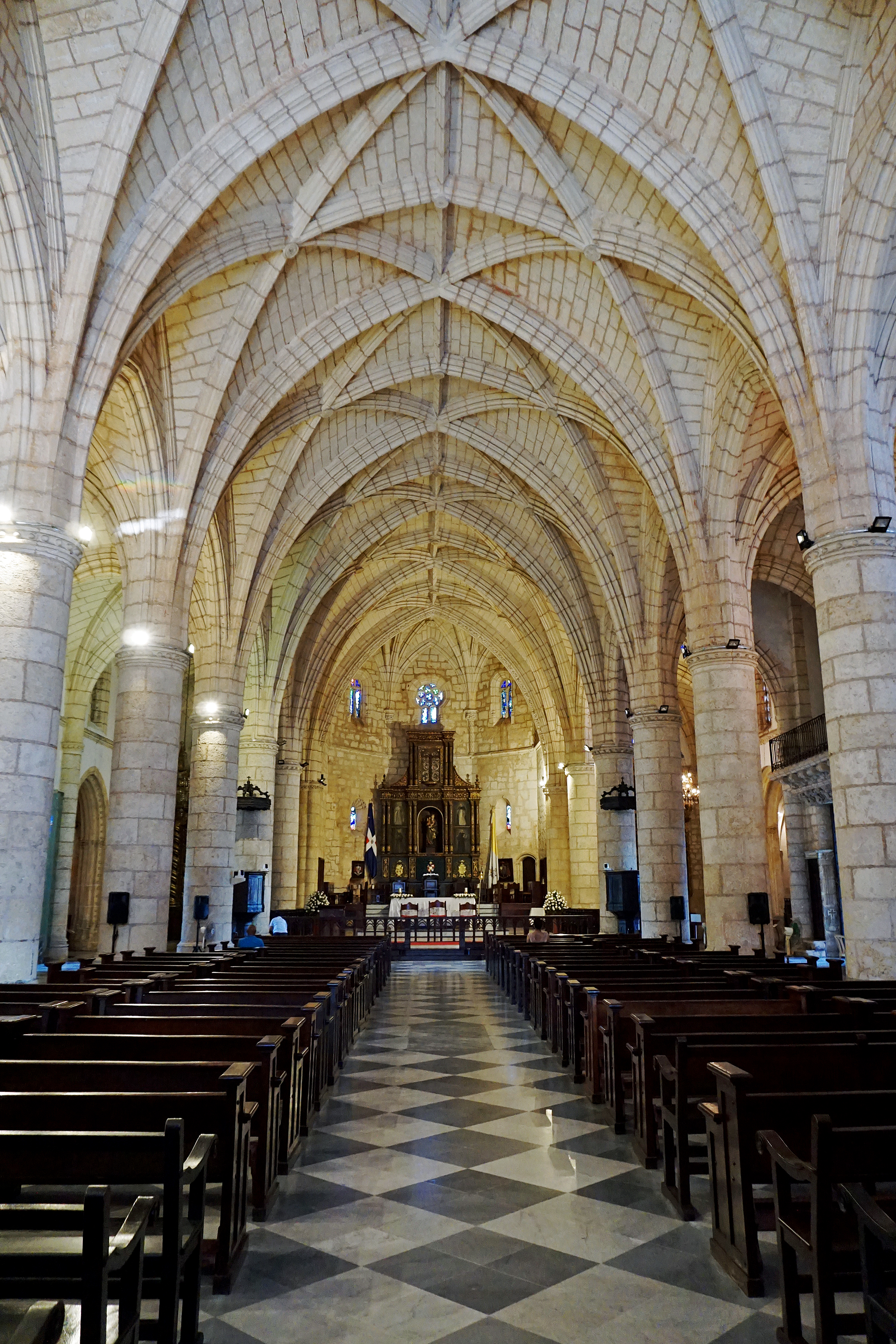
Interior

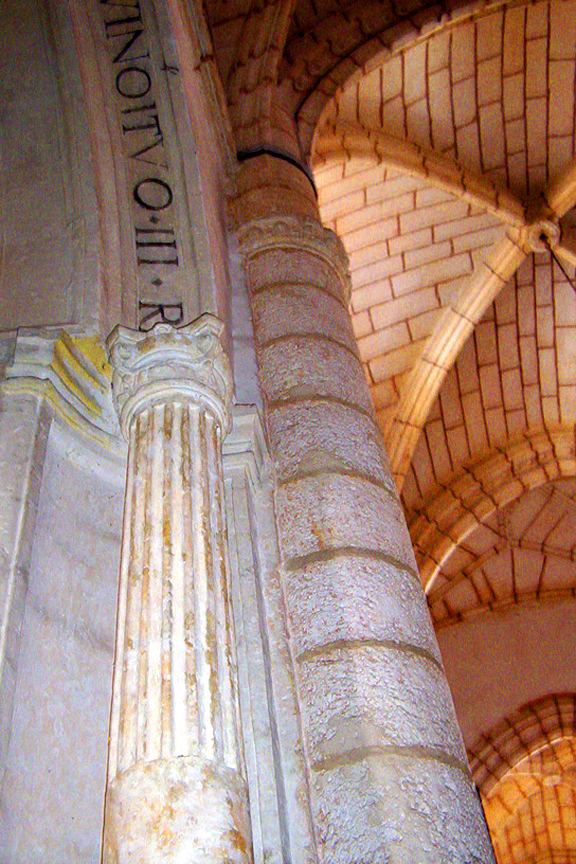
Column

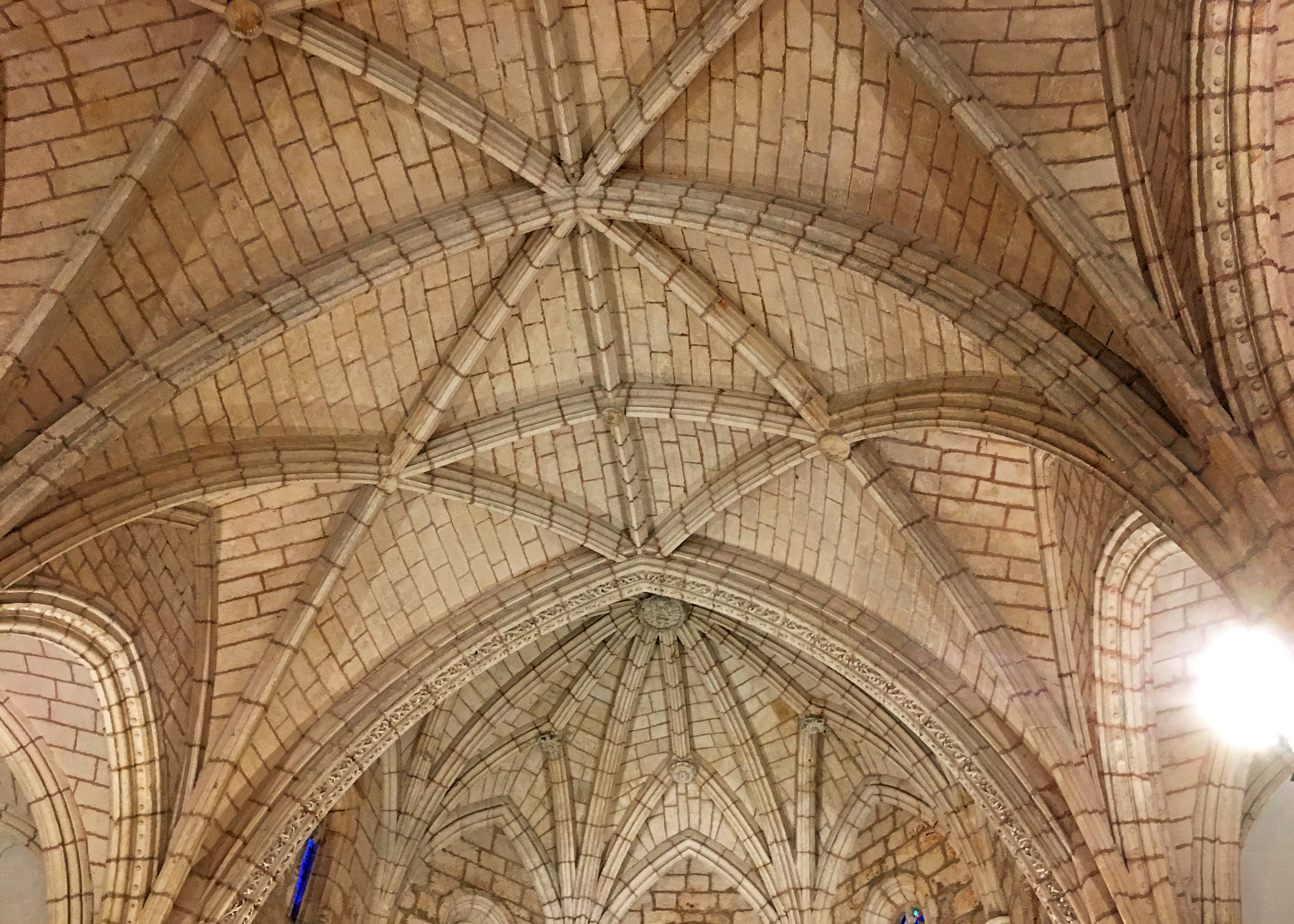
Ceiling structure
(rib vault)

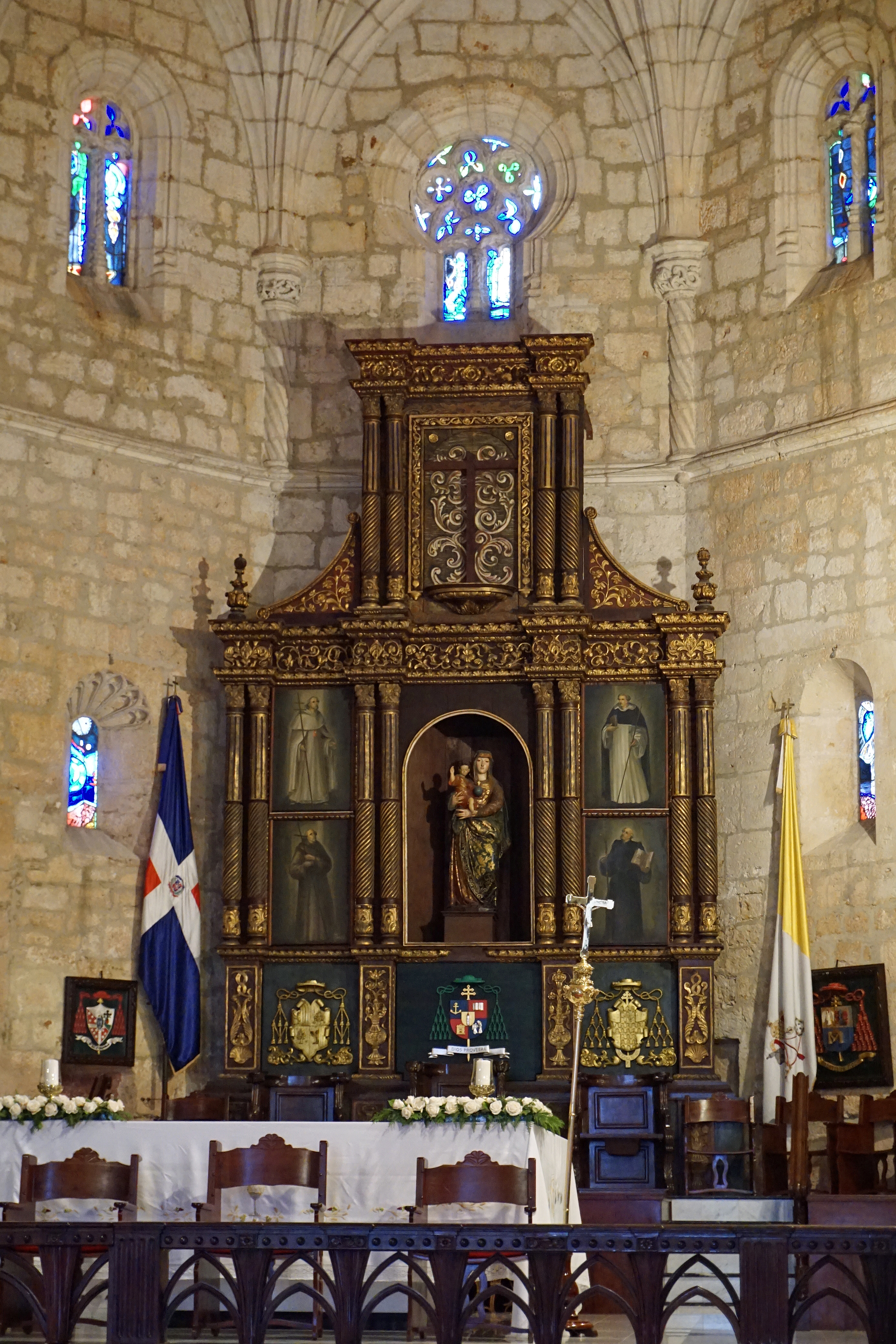
Main altar

== See also ==
- Colonial City of Santo Domingo
- Our Lady of Altagracia
- List of oldest buildings in the Americas
- Gothic architecture
- History of the Dominican Republic
- List of basilicas in North and Central America and the Caribbean
