= Roman Catholic Diocese of Magua =

The Roman Catholic Diocese of Magua was a short-lived (1504–11) Latin bishopric with its see at Magua (now Concepción de la Vega) on Hispaniola (Greater Antilles).

== History ==
- Established on 1504.11.15 as Diocese of Magua, one of the first bishoprics in the New World, on Spanish-colonial territory in the present Dominican Republic, canonically split off from its apparent Metropolitan, the Spanish Archdiocese of Sevilla.
- On 1511.08.08 it was suppressed, having had a single incumbent (who was transferred to another Antillian island), without formal successor, but in fact its see would be restored as Roman Catholic Diocese of Concepción de la Vega and later Roman Catholic Diocese of La Vega.

== Episcopal Ordinary ==
Suffragan Bishop of Magua

- Bishop-elect Alonso Manso (born 1460 Spain) (1504.11.15 – 1511.08.08), later first Bishop of Puerto Rico (Puerto Rico, now an insular area of the US) (1511.08.08 – death 1539.09.27).),

== See also ==
- List of Catholic dioceses in the Dominican Republic

== Sources and external links ==
- GCatholic - data for all sections
