= Rodrigo de Bastidas y Rodriguez de Romera =

Roman catholic Bishop

Most Reverend Rodrigo de Bastidas y Rodriguez de Romera
- Bishop of Puerto Rico
- Church: Catholic Church
- Diocese: Diocese of Puerto Rico
- Predecessor: Alonso Manso
- Successor: Francisco Andrés de Carvajal
- Previous post: Bishop of Coro (1531–1532)

Orders
- Consecration: by Francisco Mendoza

Personal details
- Born: Santo Domingo
- Died: 1570

Rodrigo de Bastidas y Rodriguez de Romera (died 1570) was a Roman Catholic prelate who served as the second Bishop of Puerto Rico (1541–1567) and the first Bishop of Coro (1531–1532).

== Biography ==
Rodrigo de Bastidas y Rodriguez de Romera was born in Santo Domingo. On June 21, 1531, and confirmed by Pope Clement VII as the first Bishop of Coro. On June 30, 1532, he was consecrated bishop by Francisco Mendoza, Bishop of Zamora. On July 6, 1541, he was appointed by Pope Paul III as the second Bishop of Puerto Rico. On May 6, 1567, he resigned as Bishop of Puerto Rico. He died in 1570.

He was the principal consecrator of Alfonso de Fuenmayor, the fifth Bishop of Santo Domingo.

== External links and additional sources ==
- Cheney, David M. "Archdiocese of Caracas, Santiago de Venezuela". Catholic-Hierarchy.org. (for Chronology of Bishops) ^{[self-published]}
- Chow, Gabriel. "Metropolitan Archdiocese of Coro". GCatholic.org. (for Chronology of Bishops) ^{[self-published]}
- Cheney, David M. "Archdiocese of San Juan de Puerto Rico". Catholic-Hierarchy.org. (for Chronology of Bishops) ^{[self-published]}
- Chow, Gabriel. "Metropolitan Archdiocese of San Juan de Puerto Rico". GCatholic.org. (for Chronology of Bishops) ^{[self-published]}

Catholic Church titles
Preceded by None	Bishop of Coro; 1531–1532	Succeeded by Miguel Jerónimo de Ballesteros
Preceded by Alonso Manso	Bishop of Puerto Rico; 1541–1567	Succeeded by Francisco Andrés de Carvajal
