= Alonso de Fuenmayor =

Roman Catholic prelate (1502–1554)

Most Reverend Alonso de Fuenmayor
- Archbishop of Santo Domingo
- Church: Catholic Church
- Diocese: Archdiocese of Santo Domingo
- In office: 1546–1554
- Predecessor: Sebastián Ramírez de Fuenleal
- Successor: Diego de Covarrubias y Leiva

Orders
- Consecration: March 1538 by Rodrigo de Bastidas y Rodriguez de Romera

Personal details
- Born: 1502 Calahorra, Spain
- Died: 1 March 1554 (age 52) Santo Domingo
- Coat of arms

Alonso de Fuenmayor (1502- 1 March 1554) was a Roman Catholic prelate who served as the Archbishop of Santo Domingo (1546–1554) and Bishop of Santo Domingo (1538–1546).

== Biography ==
Alonso de Fuenmayor was born in Calahorra, Spain. On 27 October 1538, he was appointed by the King of Spain and confirmed by Pope Paul III as Bishop of Santo Domingo. In March 1538, he was consecrated bishop by Rodrigo de Bastidas y Rodriguez de Romera, Bishop of Coro. On 12 February 1546, he was named by Pope Paul III as Archbishop of Santo Domingo after the elevation of the diocese. He served as Archbishop of Santo Domingo until his death on 1 March 1554.

== External links and additional sources ==
- Cheney, David M. "Archdiocese of Santo Domingo". Catholic-Hierarchy.org. (for Chronology of Bishops) ^{[self-published]}
- Chow, Gabriel. "Metropolitan Archdiocese of Santo Domingo". GCatholic.org. (for Chronology of Bishops) ^{[self-published]}

Religious titles
| Preceded by Sebastián Ramírez de Fuenleal | Archbishop and Bishop of Santo Domingo; 1538–1554 | Succeeded by Diego de Covarrubias y Leiva |
