= Battle of Toro =

1476 battle of the War of the Castilian Succession near Toro, Spain

- Part of the War of the Castilian Succession
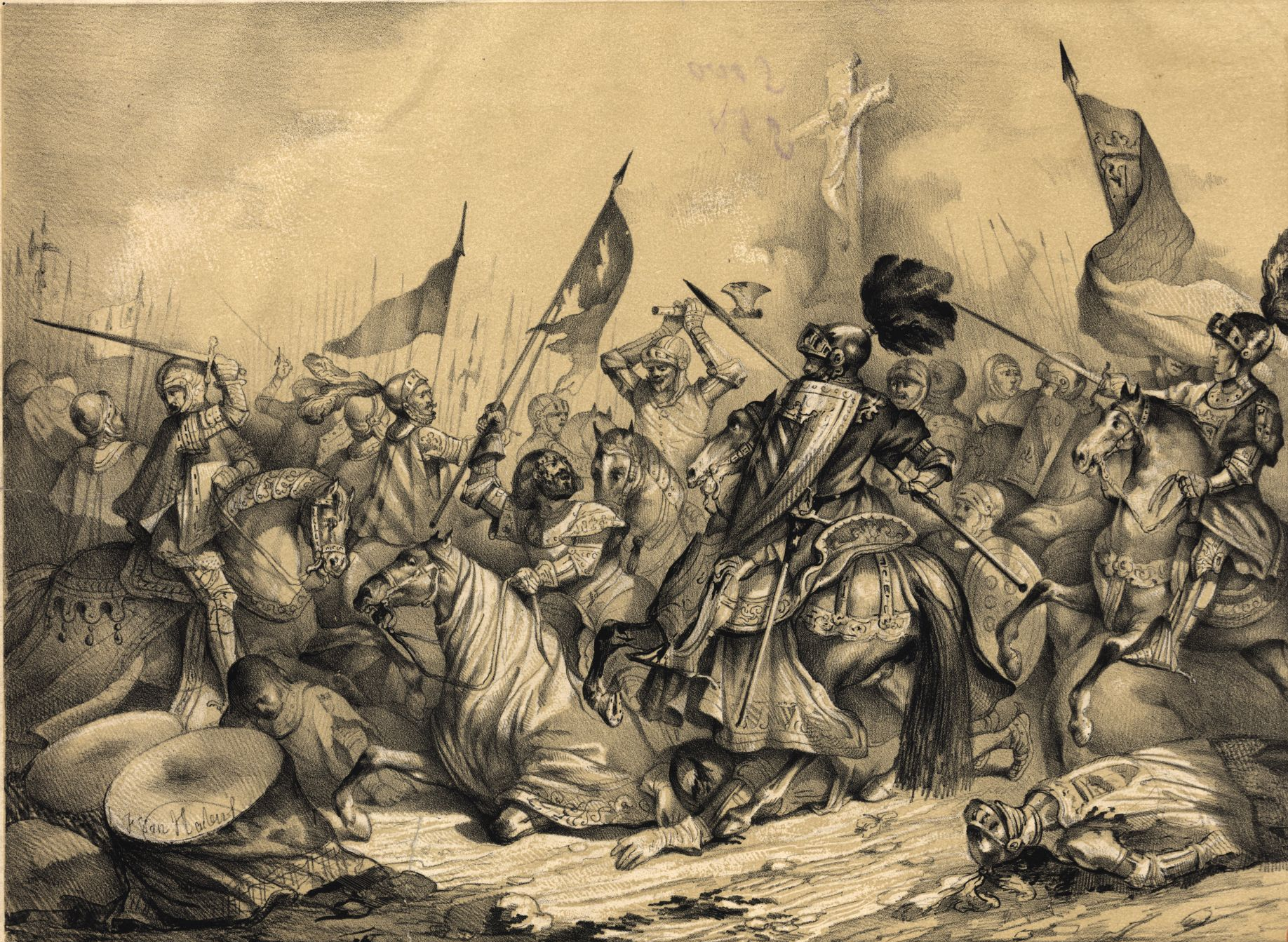
Date	1 March 1476
Location	Peleagonzalo, near Toro, Castile
Result	Indecisive

Belligerents
Kingdom of Portugal Castilian Juanistas	Castilian Isabelistas Crown of Aragon

Commanders and leaders
Afonso V of Portugal; Prince John of Portugal; Bishop of Évora; Archbishop of Toledo	Ferdinand II of Aragon; Cardinal Mendoza; Duke of Alba; Álvaro de Mendoza; Count of Alba de Aliste (POW)

Strength
About 8,500 men: 5,000 footmen; 3,500 horsemen	About 8,000 men: 5,000 footmen; 2,500 or 3,000 horsemen

Casualties and losses
Near 1,000 (dead, prisoners and drowned)	Many hundreds (dead and prisoners)

The Battle of Toro was part of the War of the Castilian Succession, fought on 1 March 1476, near the city of Toro, between the Castilian-Aragonese troops of the Catholic Monarchs and the Portuguese-Castilian forces of Afonso V and Prince John of Portugal.

The battle was militarily inconclusive, as both sides claimed victory: the Castilian right wing was defeated by the forces under Prince John who possessed the battlefield, but the troops of Afonso V were beaten by the Castilian left-centre led by the Duke of Alba and Cardinal Mendoza.

However, it was a major political victory for the Catholic Monarchs by assuring to Isabella the throne of Castile: The remnants of the nobles loyal to Juana de Trastámara adhered to Isabella. With great political vision, Isabella took advantage of the moment and summoned the 'Cortes' at Madrigal-Segovia (April–October 1476). There her daughter was proclaimed heiress of Castile's crown, which was equivalent to legitimising her own throne.

As noted by Spanish academic António Serrano: "From all of this it can be deduced that the battle [of Toro] was inconclusive, but Isabella and Ferdinand made it fly with wings of victory. (...) Actually, since this battle transformed in victory; since 1 March 1476, Isabella and Ferdinand started to rule the Spanish throne. (...) The inconclusive wings of the battle became the secure and powerful wings of San Juan's eagle [the commemorative temple of the battle of Toro] ".

The war continued until the peace of Alcáçovas (1479), and the official propaganda transformed the Battle of Toro into a victory which avenged Aljubarrota.

== Overview ==
Spanish historians Luis Suárez Fernández, Juan de Mata Carriazo and Manuel Fernández Álvarez :

"From a strictly military point of view, the battle of Toro cannot be considered a clear victory, but only a favorable fight for [the cause of] the Catholic Monarchs. It is not its intrinsic value which causes the joyful explosion of happiness among the chroniclers, but the consequences that resulted from it ... because it definitely discourages the supporters of Juana (p. 157)... but … does not contradict in any way the reality of the fact that a part of the Portuguese army, having defeated the Castilian right wing, remained on the field, withdrawing in the next day without opposition. (p. 161) … Not a military victory, but a political victory, the battle of Toro is in itself, a decisive event because it solves the civil war in favour of the Catholic Monarchs, leaving as a relic, a border clash between the two countries (p. 163) "

— in La España de los Reyes Católicos (1474–1516)

== Precedents ==
=== Background ===
The death of Henry IV of Castile, in 1474, led to a succession crisis and the formation of two rival parties: Isabella, the King's half sister, received the support of the majority of the noblemen, clerks and people, whereas Juana de Trastámara, the King's daughter, was supported by some powerful nobles.

This rivalry degenerated in civil war and the Portuguese King Afonso V intervened in the defence of his niece Juana's rights, to whom he married. He tried to unify the crowns of Castile and Portugal as an alternative to the union of Castile with Aragon, personified in the marriage of Isabella to Ferdinand, the heir of Aragon's throne.

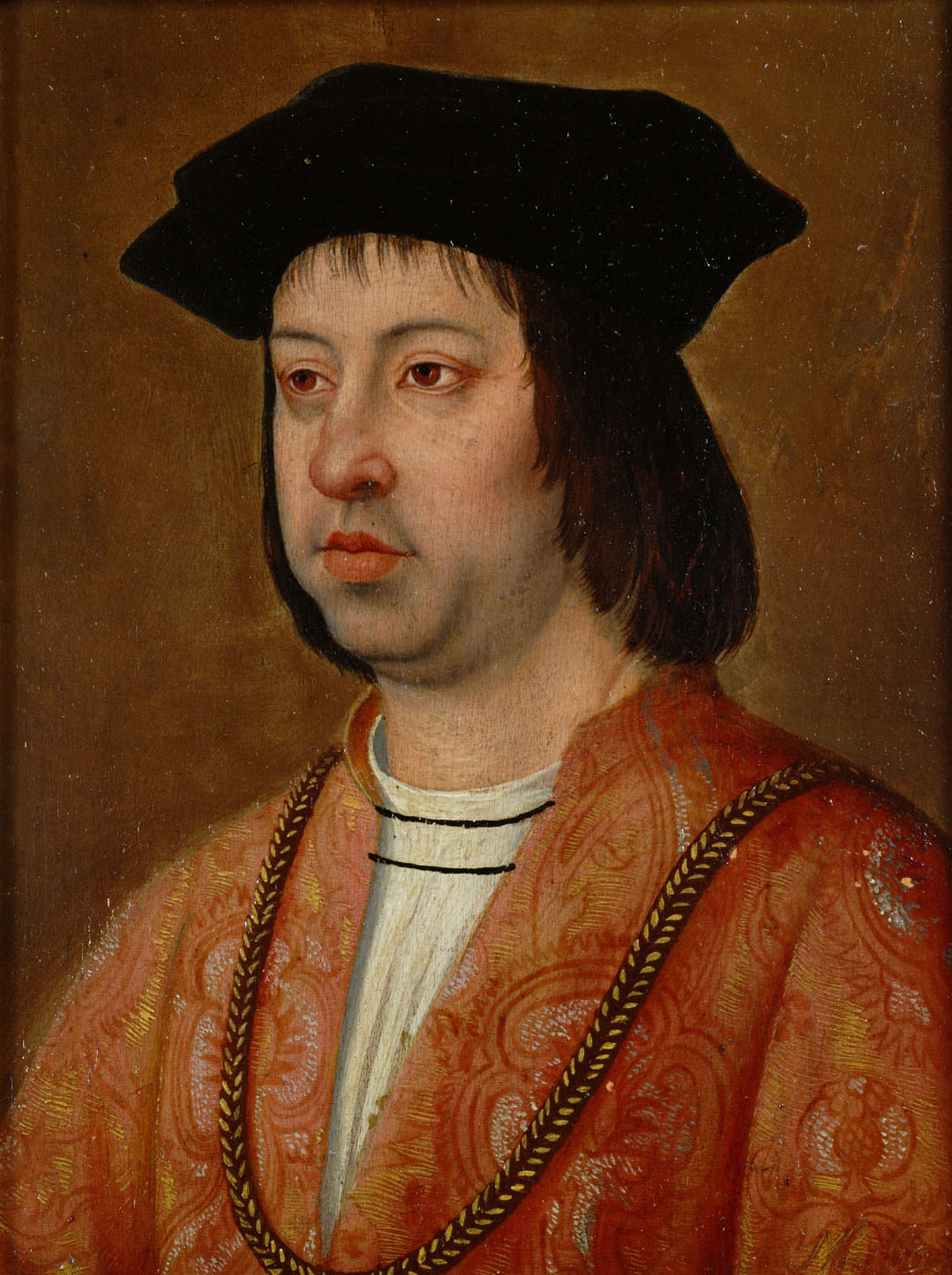
Ferdinand II of Aragon, married with Isabella. He conquered two peninsular kingdoms (Navarra and Granada), launching the foundations of Modern Spain. He also defeated the French in Italy.

=== Burgos expedition: turning point of the war ===
After some skirmishes, Afonso V's army marched for the rescue of the besieged castle inside Burgos. On the way, at Baltanás, it defeated and imprisoned a force of 400 spearmen of the Count of Benavente (18 – XI – 1475) and also took Cantalapiedra, reaching the distance of only 60 km from Burgos.

The Castilian allies pressed Afonso V to advance south towards Madrid, where they assured him many supporters. The King, who did not want to stretch his communication lines with Portugal, did not listen to them and withdrew leaving Burgos to its fate. The city surrendered on 28 January 1476, and Afonso's prestige sank. It is the turning point of the war: Ocaña and other places changed side, the Estuñiga family defected, the mighty Marquis of Villena, Diego López Pacheco, denied his military support and the Juanista band began its dissolution.

=== Zamora: prelude to the Battle of Toro ===
Afonso V preferred to secure its line of cities and strongholds along the Duero River, but on 4 December 1475, a part of the Zamora's garrison – a key Juanista city – rebelled and besieged the inner fortress, where the Portuguese took refuge. Ferdinand II of Aragon entered the city next day.

At the end of January 1476, Afonso V received the reinforcement troops led by his own son, the Perfect Prince, and in the middle of February 1476, the combined Portuguese forces besieged Ferdinand's Army (locked inside the city of Zamora), putting him in the curious situation of besieger being besieged.

After two cold and rainy weeks, the besiegers decided to leave and rest in the city of Toro. Ferdinand pursued and reached them near Toro, where both armies decided to engage in battle.

== Disposition of the forces ==
=== Isabelist army of D. Ferdinand ===
- Centre: Commanded by Ferdinand, it included the royal guard and forces of several hidalgos, like Count of Lemos and the mayordomo mayor Enrique Enriquez. It was formed mainly by popular militias of several cities like Zamora, Ciudad Rodrigo or Valladolid.
- Right wing: it had 6 divisions ("batallas" or "battles") of light cavalry or jennets, commanded by their captains: Álvaro de Mendoza (the main captain), the Bishop of Ávila and Alfonso de Fonseca (these two men shared the command of one battle), Pedro de Guzmán, Bernal Francés, Vasco de Vivero and Pedro de Velasco. This wing is sometimes called vanguard as some of his men closely followed the Portuguese from Zamora to Toro. It was divided in two lines: five battles at the forefront and one in the rear.
- Left wing: here were many knights with heavy armour, divided in 3 corps: the left one, near the Portuguese, commanded by Admiral Enríquéz; the centre one, led by Cardinal Mendoza, and on the right, the force headed by the Duke of Alba. It was the most powerful.
- Reserve forces: the men of Enrique Enríquez, Count of Alba de Aliste (King Ferdinand's uncle and Galicia's governor, who would be taken prisoner by the Portuguese); and the horsemen from the marquis of Astorga.

The foot soldiers were in the middle of all those battles. In practical terms, the Isabelist army fought on two separate fronts: right wing and left-centre or Royal Battle (due to the presence of Ferdinand).

=== Portuguese-Castilian army of Afonso V / The Perfect Prince ===
- Centre: commanded by Afonso V, it was formed by the knights of several noblemen from his House and the Castilian knights loyal to D. Juana led by Rui Pereira. It also had 4 bodies of footmen with their backs turned to the Duero River.
- Right wing: troops of some Portuguese nobles and the Castilians of the Toledo's Archbishop, Alfonso Carrillo.
- Left wing: here were the elite troops of the kingdom (chevaliers) together with the army's artillery (arquebusiers) and the javelin throwers. It was commanded by the Perfect Prince, who had as his main captain the Bishop of Évora. It included a rear guard battle under Pedro de Meneses.

Because of the split of leadership between the King and Prince, the Portuguese army also fought divided into two parts which did not help each other: left wing or Prince's battle and right-centre or Royal Battle.

== Battle ==
=== The Perfect Prince defeats the right wing of Ferdinand's army ===
The forces of Prince John and of the Bishop of Évora, formed by arquebusiers, javelin throwers, and by the Portuguese elite knights, screaming "St. George! St. George!", invested the six bodies or battles in the right wing of the Castilian army. The Prince attacked the five advanced battles while the battle of Pedro de Meneses attacked the other one. The Castilian forces (which were very select) withdrew in disorder, after suffering heavy losses.

Chronicler Hernando del Pulgar (Castilian): "promptly, those 6 Castilian captains, which we already told were at the right side of the royal battle, and were invested by the prince of Portugal and the bishop of Évora, turned their backs and put themselves on the run".

Chronicler Garcia de Resende (Portuguese): "and being the battles of both sides ordered that way and prepared to attack by nearly sunshine, the King ordered the prince to attack the enemy with his and God's blessing, which he obeyed (...). (...) and after the sound of the trumpets and screaming all for S. George invested so bravely the enemy battles, and in spite of their enormous size, they could not stand the hard fight and were rapidly beaten and put on the run with great losses."

Chronicler Pedro de Medina (Castilian): "In the Portuguese left wing, where the people of the Prince of Portugal and from the Bishop of Évora were, a very cruel battle began in which the Castilians were defeated: due to the large artillery and shotgun's bullets from the enemy, a huge number of Castilians promptly fell dead and was necessary to remove another crowd of wounded men. As for the remaining, they found a great resistance in the Portuguese since this was their strongest army's side, as already told, and were forced to withdraw (...). Having been so easily defeated the right battle of the Castilian army; the other two attacked their respective counterparts in order to avenge the affront and losses."

Chronicler Juan de Mariana (Castilian): " ... the [Castilian] horsemen ... moved forward (...).They were received by prince D. John... whose charge... they couldn't stand but were instead defeated and ran away."

Chronicler Damião de Góis (Portuguese): "... these Castilians who were on the right of the Castilian Royal battle, received [the charge of] the Prince's men as brave knights invoking Santiago but they couldn't resist them and began to flee, and [so] our men killed and arrested many of them, and among those who escaped some took refuge ... in their Royal battle which was on the left of these six [Castilian] divisions.".

Chronicler Garibay (Spanish): " ... D. Alfonso de Fonseca first and then Álvaro de Mendoza ... and other [captains] begged the King [Ferdinand] permission to be the first to attack the Prince's squad ... which was the strength of the Portuguese army, and the King authorized them, provided that the six battles named above remained together (...). And facing the Prince's squads ... they were defeated, many of them dying due to artillery and javelin throwers ... and this way, the victory in the beginning was for the Portuguese ..."

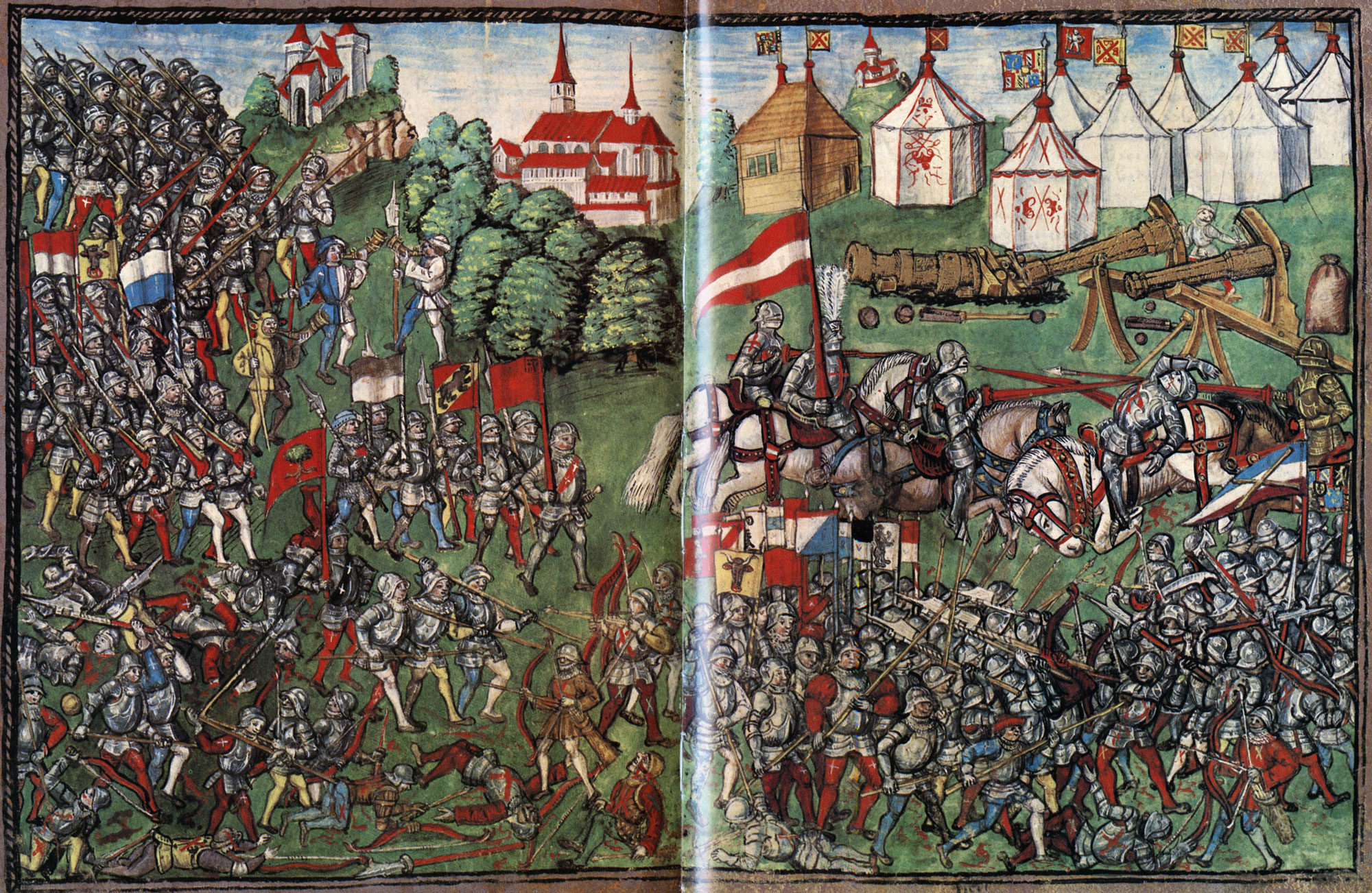
Chevaliers and footmen in combat (battle of Grandson, 2 March 1476)

The Prince's men pursued the fugitives along the land. The Prince, in order to avoid the dispersion of his troops, decided to make a halt: "and the prince, as a wise captain, seeing the great victory God had given to him and the good fate of that hour, chose to secure the honour of victory than follow the chase."( Garcia de Resende) But some of his men went too far (Rui de Pina says during a league, 5 km) and paid the price: "and some of the important people and others ... in the heat of victory chased [the fugitives] so deeply that they were killed or captured." According to Rui de Pina, this happened because some of these fugitives, after a hard chase, gathered with one of Ferdinand's battles on the rear and faced the most temerarious pursuers. Pulgar confirms this post chase episode: "Many of those who were on those 6 Castilian battles defeated by the Prince of Portugal at the beginning, seeing the victory of the other king's battles on their respective side [left wing and centre], assembled with the people of the King and fought again" (3 hours after the beginning of the battle, according to him).

Pulgar justifies the defeat of the Isabelistas with the fact that the Prince's battle attacked as a block, while the Castilians were divided into six battles. So, each of them was successively beaten off without benefiting from the help of the others. Another factor cited by the same chronicler was "the great loss" suffered by the Castilians as a result of the fire from the many arquebusiers in the Prince's battle. Zurita adds that the Prince successfully attacked with such "impetus" that the remaining men of the Castilian army became "disturbed".

These events had important consequences. The Portuguese chroniclers unanimously stated what Rui de Pina synthesised this way: " ... king D. Ferdinand ... as soon as he saw defeated his first and big battles [on the right], and believing the same fate would happen to his own battles at the hands of King Afonso's battles, was counselled to withdraw as he did to Zamora".

Among the Castilians, Pulgar – the official chronicler of the Catholic Monarchs – says that Ferdinand withdrew from the battlefield for other reasons. Its justification: "the King promptly returned to the city of Zamora ["volvió luego"] because he was told that people from the King of Portugal, located in the city of Toro on the other side of the river, could attack the "estanzas" he left besieging the Zamora's fortress. And the cardinal and the duke of Alba stayed on the battlefield (...)."

Not only Pulgar reveals that Ferdinand left the battlefield before Cardinal Mendoza and the duke of Alba, but the expression "promptly returned" seems to indicate that the King stayed a small time on the battlefield, delegating the leadership on these two main commanders. On the other hand, it was highly improbable that Ferdinand risked helping Zamora in a Royal battle which was deciding the destiny of the entire kingdom of Castile. This city wasn't at risk since it was inconceivable that the small Portuguese garrison of Toro dared to attack in a very dark and rainy night the powerful and distant city of Zamora (29,2 km in straight way, but farther through the mountains), instead of helping the forces of his King and Prince which were fighting with difficulties practically at its gates.

The victorious Prince's forces (which included the best Portuguese troops) were still on the field and were continuously raising their numbers with dispersed men converging to them from every corner of the field. According to the chivalry codes of that time, to withdraw from the battlefield under these circumstances instead of confronting this new threat and not remaining 3 days on the battlefield -as a sign of victory- would be the proof that he had not won.

Indeed, it is much more probable that Ferdinand had retreated to Zamora in the beginning of the battle as a consequence of the defeat of the right side of his army (things could get worse). However, there is a sharp contrast between the prudent but orderly retreat of Ferdinand to Zamora and the precipitated escape of Afonso V to avoid imprisonment.

=== The Royal Battle of Ferdinand defeats the Royal Battle of Afonso V ===
In the meantime, the other Castilian troops were fighting a fierce combat with their direct opponents. The Castilian centre charged the Portuguese centre while the Castilian left wing, superiorly commanded by Cardinal Mendoza and Duke of Alba, attacked the Portuguese right wing: "...those from the battle of the King [Castilian centre] as well as those...from the left wing, charged [respectively] against the battle of the King of Portugal...and against the other Portuguese of their right wing."

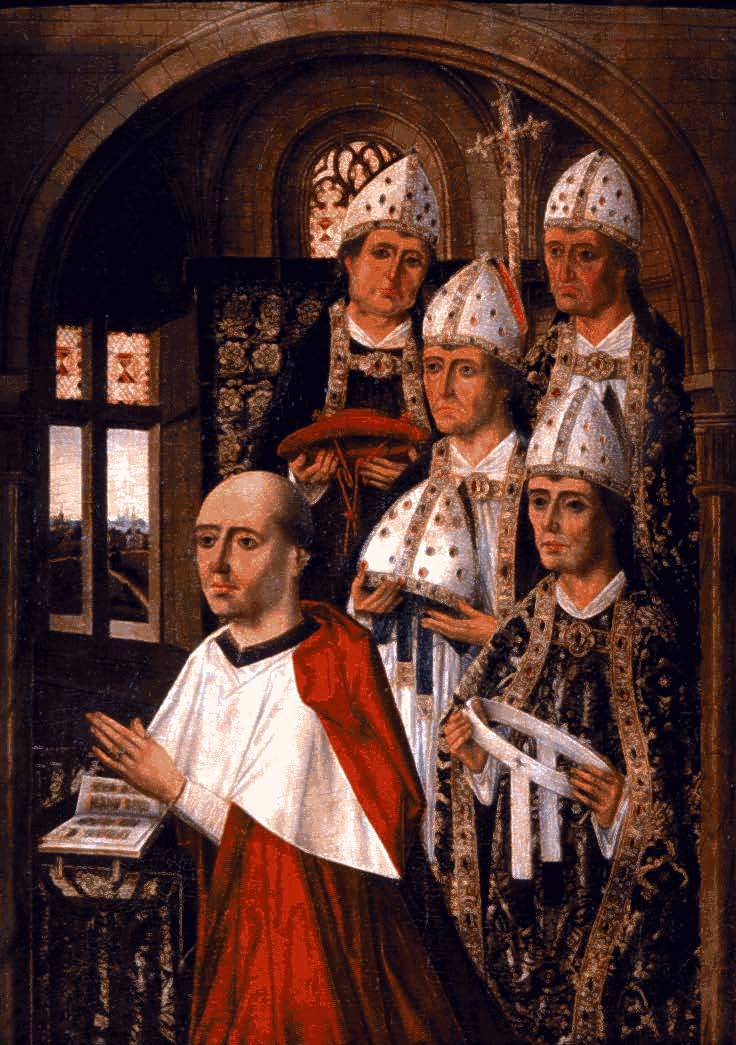
Cardinal Mendoza among other cardinals. Both a brilliant military leader and a very respected voice by the Catholic Monarchs.

Sensing the hesitation of his forces because of the Portuguese attack on the other end of the battlefield, the cardinal rode forward and shouted, "here is the cardinal, traitors!". He would be wounded but kept fighting with bravery.

The Portuguese started to break. The struggle around the Portuguese royal standard was ferocious: having the flag carrier's (the ensign Duarte de Almeida) hand cut off, he transferred the standard to the remaining hand which was also cut off. So he sustained the standard on the air with his teeth until he fainted under the wounds inflicted by the enemies which surrounded and captured him.

Afonso V, seeing his standard lost and supposing he had equally beaten his son's forces (which were smaller than his) sought death in combat, but was prevented from doing so by those around him. They took him to Castronuño where he was welcomed by the alcalde.

By then, the Portuguese disbanded in all directions and many of them drowned in the Duero River because of the darkness and confusion. The Castilians captured 8 flags and sacked the Portuguese camp. Bernaldez painted a grandiose picture of the loot mentioning many horses, prisoners, gold, silver and clothes, which was doubtful given the dark and rainy night described by the chroniclers. In fact, Pulgar recognises that the product of the loot was modest: "and the people who participated on the battle during the previous day divided the captured spoils: which were in small quantity because it was a very dark night".

Pulgar: "At last the portuguese couldn't stand the mighty force of the castilians and were defeated, and they ran seeking refuge in the city of Toro.(...) [the] Portugal's King seeing the defeat of his men, gave up of going to Toro to avoid being molested by the men of the King [Ferdinand], and with three or four men of all those who were responsible for his security went to Castronuño that night. (...) consequently many Portuguese were killed or taken prisoners..."

Pulgar wrote that a large number of both Castilians and Portuguese died in the battle, but while the Castilians died fighting, the Portuguese drowned while trying to escape by swimming across the river Duero.

Rui de Pina justifies the Portuguese Royal Battle's defeat with the fact that the best Portuguese troops were with the Prince and were missed by the King, and also because there were many arquebusiers in the Castilian Royal Battle whose fire scared the Portuguese horses.

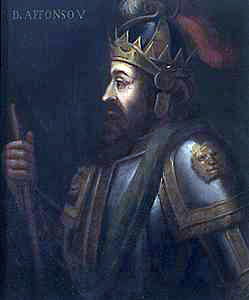
Afonso V, the "African".

With the darkness of the night and the intense rain, chaos reigned. There were dispersed men from all sides: fugitives from the Castilian right wing, Portuguese pursuers, fugitive soldiers from the Portuguese King, the Cardinal Mendoza's men and the Duke of Alba's men were divided between pursuing the Portuguese and sacking their spoils and still; the Prince's men returned in the meantime. The battlefield became a very dangerous place where the minimal error could lead to death or imprisonment. As an example and according to Pulgar, some Portuguese shouted "Ferdinand, Ferdinand!" to lure their pursuers making them think they were Castilians.

As a consequence of this triumph, Ferdinand promptly sent a letter to the cities of Castile claiming victory, but without mentioning neither the defeat of part of his forces nor the retreat of his remaining troops when faced with the forces of Prince John, who possessed the camp and also claimed victory.

Later, the Perfect Prince also sent a letter to the main cities of Portugal, Lisbon and Porto, ordering the commemoration of his triumph on the battle of Toro (but not mentioning his father's defeat) with a solemn procession on each anniversary of the battle.

Isabella immediately ordered a thanks giving procession at Tordesillas, and in many other cities feasts and religious ceremonies were organised to celebrate the great "victory God has given to the King and to her people." She would also build a magnificent commemorative Gothic temple at Toledo, the Monastery of S. Juan de los Reyes, to dissipate any doubts and perpetuate her victory.

As the Historian Justo Gonzalez summarises: "Both armies faced each other at the camps of Toro resulting in an undecided battle. But while the Portuguese King reorganized his troops, Ferdinand sent news to all the cities of Castile and to several foreign kingdoms informing them about a huge victory where the Portuguese were crushed. Faced with these news, the party of "la Beltraneja" [Juana] was dissolved and the Portuguese were forced to return to their kingdom." The key of the war was the Castilian public opinion, not the Portuguese.

=== The Perfect Prince becomes master of the battlefield ===
Meanwhile Prince John returned after a brief chase, defeating one of the Castilian battles where the men were dispersed looting the spoils of the defeated Portuguese. However, faced with other enemy battles, he abstained from attacking and put his men in a defensive position on a hill. He lighted big fires and played the trumpets to guide all the Portuguese spread throughout the camp towards him and to defy the enemy. He acted this way because, according to the chronicler Álvaro Chaves, the Prince's forces were under-numbered as most of his men had gone in pursuit of the adversaries: "(...) [the Prince] turned against the battles of king D. Ferdinand, but because the people from his battles spread in the pursue of the defeated, the enemy's battle outnumbered the few men that remained with him, but in spite of that he attacked and defeated it and he went on until he faced other enemy battles, and then he stopped his battle to recover some of his dispersed men (...) because the enemy had the triple of his people."

Pulgar: "And because the people of his father and King were defeated and dispersed, the Prince of Portugal went up to a hill and played the trumpets and lighted fires in order to recover some of the fugitives and stood on with his battle..."

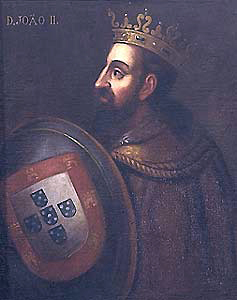
Prince John, the "Perfect Prince". His military behaviour at the Battle of Toro was praised by his adversary Ferdinand. This happened when some nobles pressed King Ferdinand to force his royal chronicler Pulgar to change what he wrote about Prince John during that battle. Indeed, the Castilian chronicles reveal that the Perfect Prince was the only leader who fulfilled all the premises of a winner: he defeated a part of the enemy, he stood "without suffering defeat" (Juan de Mariana), and finally he mastered the battlefield (Bernaldez, and Juan de Mariana). Ferdinand summed up the battle of Toro in a private letter to Isabella: "if it had not been for the chicken [Prince John], the old cock [Afonso V] would have been taken."

The Prince's men took some prisoners, among them King Ferdinand's uncle, D. Enrique, Count of Alba de Liste, and for his great joy, they retook his father's royal standard as well as the Castilian noble who carried it, Souto Mayor (according to the chroniclers Rui de Pina, Garcia de Resende Damião de Góis).

With the Prince's forces increasing continuously, no military leader could be considered winner without defeating this new threat, which included the Portuguese elite troops who had defeated the Castilian right wing. Zurita: "This could have been a very costly victory if the Prince of Portugal, who always had his forces in good order, and was very near the river banks, had attacked our men who were dispersed and without order".

The Cardinal Mendoza and the Duke of Alba began to join their dispersed men to remove the new threat: "against who [Prince John] the Spain's cardinal as well as the Duke of Alba intended to go with some men that they were able to collect from those returned from the chase and from those who were spread around the camp capturing horses and prisoners..." ( Pulgar).

Two great heterogeneous battles (a Portuguese and a Castilian one) formed this way, standing face to face and playing musical instruments to intimidate each other: "(...) so close were the men from one part and the other, that some knights went out of the battles to invest with the spears [individual combats]" (Álvaro Lopes).

But the Cardinal and the Duke of Alba couldn't convince their men to move and attack the Prince's forces: "(...) and they couldn't join and move the men". That's corroborated by the Portuguese chronicler Garcia de Resende: "being very close to him [the Prince] so many men of King D. Ferdinand, they didn't dare to attack him because they had seen his men fighting so bravely and observed the security and order of his forces (...)"

Pulgar felt the necessity to justify the fact that the Castilians, which assumed the victory, didn't attack the victorious Prince and have instead retreated to Zamora: "(...) because the night was so dark they [the Castilians] couldn't neither see nor recognize each other and because the men were so tired and haven't eaten all day as they left Zamora by morning (...) and turned back to the city of Zamora."

These circumstances, which applied to the enemy as well, don't explain the Castilian behaviour: the chronicles of both sides show that the Prince's battle kept increasing (making a "gross battle"), because towards it moved many defeated and fugitives from the Royal Battle and also the Prince's men coming back from the enemy's chase, and even contingents of soldiers from Toro, which crossed the battlefield to reinforce the Prince. Thus, if all these men could reach the Prince, the Castilians could do it too, especially because the two battles (the Portuguese and the Castilian) were so proximal that the men could listen to each other: "(...) being so close to each other [the Portuguese and the Castilians] that they could hear what they talked about (...)" (Garcia de Resende).

At last the Castilians withdrew in disorder to Zamora.

Rui de Pina: "And being the two enemy battles face to face, the Castilian battle was deeply agitated and showing clear signs of defeat if attacked as it was without King and dubious of the outcome.(...) And without discipline and with great disorder they went to Zamora. So being the Prince alone on the field without suffering defeat but inflicting it on the adversary he became heir and master of his own victory".

Damião de Góis: "being the night so advanced (...) the Castilians left the camp in small groups (...) and neither the Cardinal of Castile nor the duke of Alba could impose them order; they also went to Zamora with the men who remained with them in the most silent way possible as all the people had fled (...) and the Prince realizing their retreat didn't pursue them (...) because he feared [that the Castilian retreat was] a war trap, but that wasn't the intention of the Castilians because by morning not a soul was seen on the field (...), resulting in a victorious Prince with all his people in order (...)"

Álvaro de Chaves: "They abruptly left the camp towards Zamora as defeated men"

Garcia de Resende: "And after the Prince had been most of the night on the battlefield, and seeing that the enemy had fled leaving no soul behind, and having nothing more to do, he decided to stand on the camp for three days (...)". He would be convinced by the Toledo's Archbishop to stay there only three hours as a symbol of the three days.

After defeating their direct opponents and because of the dark and rainy night, Prince John's tactical choice had been to prevent the dissemination of his forces during the subsequent chase, slowly gathering the scattered men from all proveniences, in order to recover his lost operational power and attack the Castilians early the next day.

The Prince made a triumphal march towards Toro, carrying his Castilian prisoners, and "with his flags draping and at the sound of trumpets." But very soon the sadness dominated him because nobody knew where his father, the King, was. Besides that, the city of Toro was chaotic, with its gates closed because the Portuguese mistrusted their Castilian allies who they accused of treason and blamed for the defeat of their King.

The Prince ordered the gates to be opened, restored the order and on the next day he sent a force to Castronuño, which brought back the King. He also "sent some of his captains to the battlefield to bury the dead and to redact a victory act, which was entirely made without contradiction".

The fact that the Portuguese remained masters of the battlefield is documented in contemporary sources from both sides: Pulgar first states that King Ferdinand withdrew from the battlefield to Zamora before Cardinal Mendoza and the Duke of Alba, and then he declares that his army (now under command of the Cardinal and Duke) also withdrew from the battlefield to Zamora – after an attempt to attack Prince John, who was thus left in possession of the battlefield.

And Bernaldez explicitly wrote that the Prince only returned to Toro after the withdrawal of Ferdinand's army: "The people of King D. Ferdinand, both horsemen and peons, plundered the camp and all the spoils they found in front of the Prince of Portugal, who during that night never moved from top of a hill, until (...) King D. Ferdinand left to Zamora with his people plus the spoils. Then, the Prince of Portugal left to Toro."

Juan de Mariana corroborates him: "(...) the enemy led by prince D. John of Portugal, who without suffering defeat, stood on a hill with his forces in good order until very late (...). Thus, both forces [Castilians and Portuguese] remained face to face for some hours; and the Portuguese kept their position during more time (...)"

== Balance ==
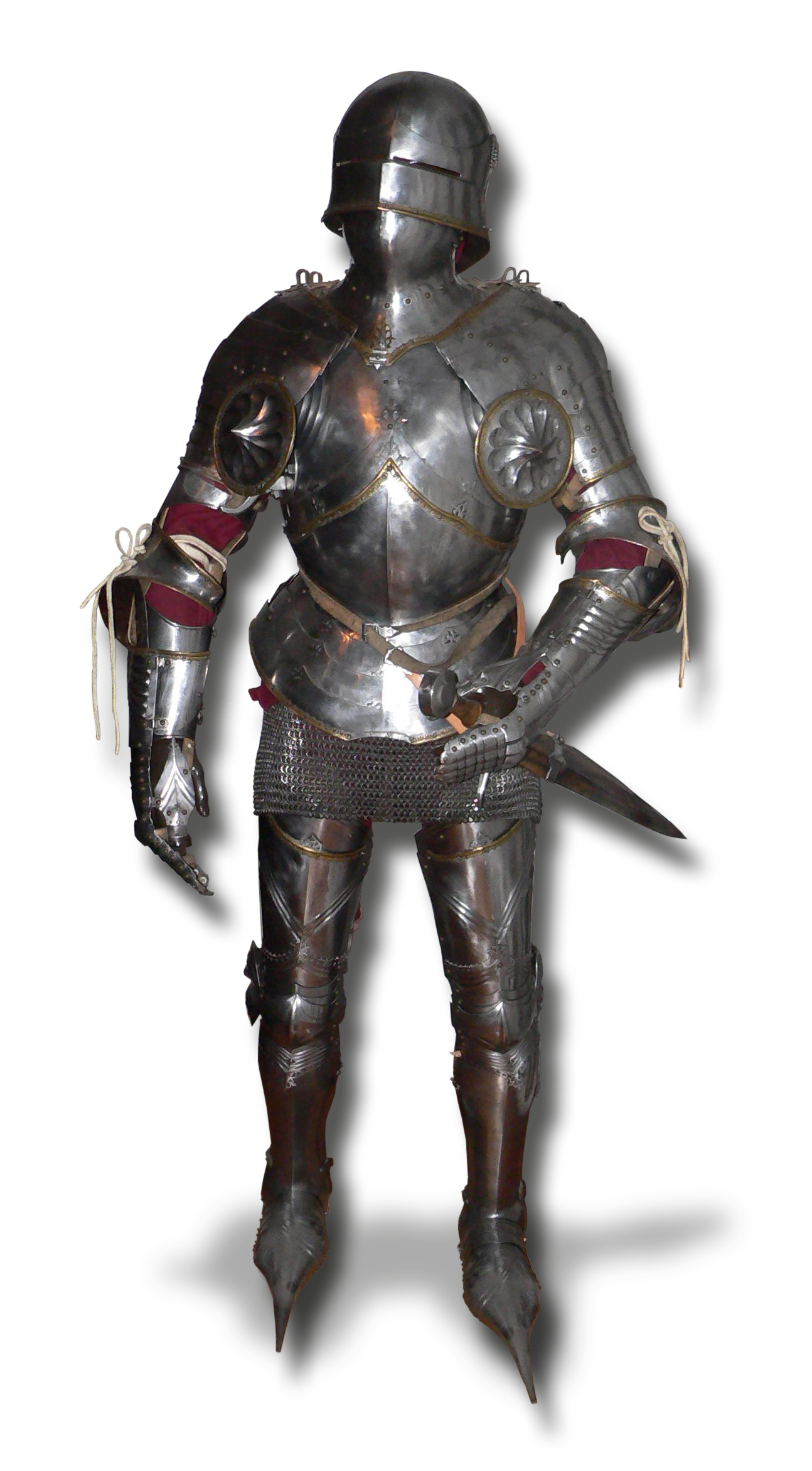
Complete medieval armour

The Portuguese chronicles agree with the Castilian official chronicler Pulgar in most of the essential facts about the battle of Toro. Both show that the strongest part of each army (the Castilian and Portuguese left wings, respectively led by Cardinal Mendoza and Prince John) never fought each other: only at the end, says Pulgar, there was an unsuccessful attempt of Cardinal Mendoza and Duke of Alba to attack the forces of the Prince, quickly followed by a withdrawal of the Castilian army to Zamora. This was probably decisive for the outcome of the battle, because each one of the armies won where it was stronger. Naturally the Castilian and Portuguese chroniclers focused their attention on their respective victory.

- Each side had a part of its army defeated and one part winner (the Castilian army had its right wing defeated and its left-centre winner. The Portuguese army had its right-centre defeated and its left wing victorious);
- Both Kings left the battlefield: Ferdinand to Zamora in an orderly way (probably after the victorious attack of the Prince) and Afonso V fled after the defeat of his Royal Battle by the Castilian left-centre;
- The battlefield stood in possession of the Prince's forces increased by many combatants spread throughout the camp which converged to him (tactical victory);
- The Portuguese royal standard was retaken by the Prince's men;
- The losses were large in both armies (in relative terms) but small in absolute value;
- Both sides proclaimed victory;
- The battle represented a victory for the aspirations of Isabella to the throne of Castile, regardless of its uncertain military outcome. As the Spanish historian Ana Isabel Carrasco Manchado puts it: "It's difficult to assess the importance of this battle from a military perspective. Indubitably, it represented a moral turning point for the party of Isabella and Ferdinand."

== The polemic ==
Indeed, the Battle of Toro consisted almost in two separated combats: one won by the troops of Prince John and the other by Ferdinand's forces.

None of the intervenients had access to a global vision of the battle due to the geographic separation of the two engagements and also because of the darkness, fog and rain. Therefore, it is natural that separated combats with different outcomes have originated different versions among the chroniclers of both sides, and as revealed by Pulgar, between Castilians and Portuguese: "there held the old question about the force and bravery".

Due to all of this, the only way to get a historical and impartial reconstitution of the Battle of Toro is by analysing the sources of both sides.

In fact, there is not an essential contradiction between the victory proclamations of both sides. As observed by the Spanish academic Luis Suárez Fernández: "But this document [Ferdinand's letter communicating his victory to the cities] of great importance does not contain more than the bare attribution of the victory to the Castilian arms, and doesn't contradict in any way the reality of one part of the Portuguese army, winner of one of the [Castilian] wings, staying on the camp and being able to retreat on the next day without being hindered. Neither is contradiction in the admission that being a dubious business it represented a very great political victory to Ferdinand and Isabella as it finished what still remained from the Juana's party."

== The recovery of the Portuguese royal standard ==
The Portuguese chroniclers unanimously state that the Portuguese royal standard was retaken from the enemy by Gonçalo Pires, whose nickname became Bandeira (in Portuguese it means "Flag") in memory of that deed, and so he became Gonçalo Pires Bandeira (coat of arms chart conceded on 4 July 1483 by King John II). The Castilian who carried it – Souto Mayor – was captured and the others fled.

The Portuguese chronicler Rui de Pina made a hard critic to the King himself. He accuses Afonso V of ingratitude towards Gonçalo Pires, the man who served him so well and retook the lost standard: the royal rent given to him was so miserable (5,000 Reis) that he had to work in agriculture in order to survive (the manual work as a stigma to the medieval mentality). This was certainly common knowledge, because other way it would be a gratuitous slander to the King Afonso V (uncle of the monarch Manuel I to whom Rui de Pina wrote his chronicle) from which his author wouldn't benefit at all.

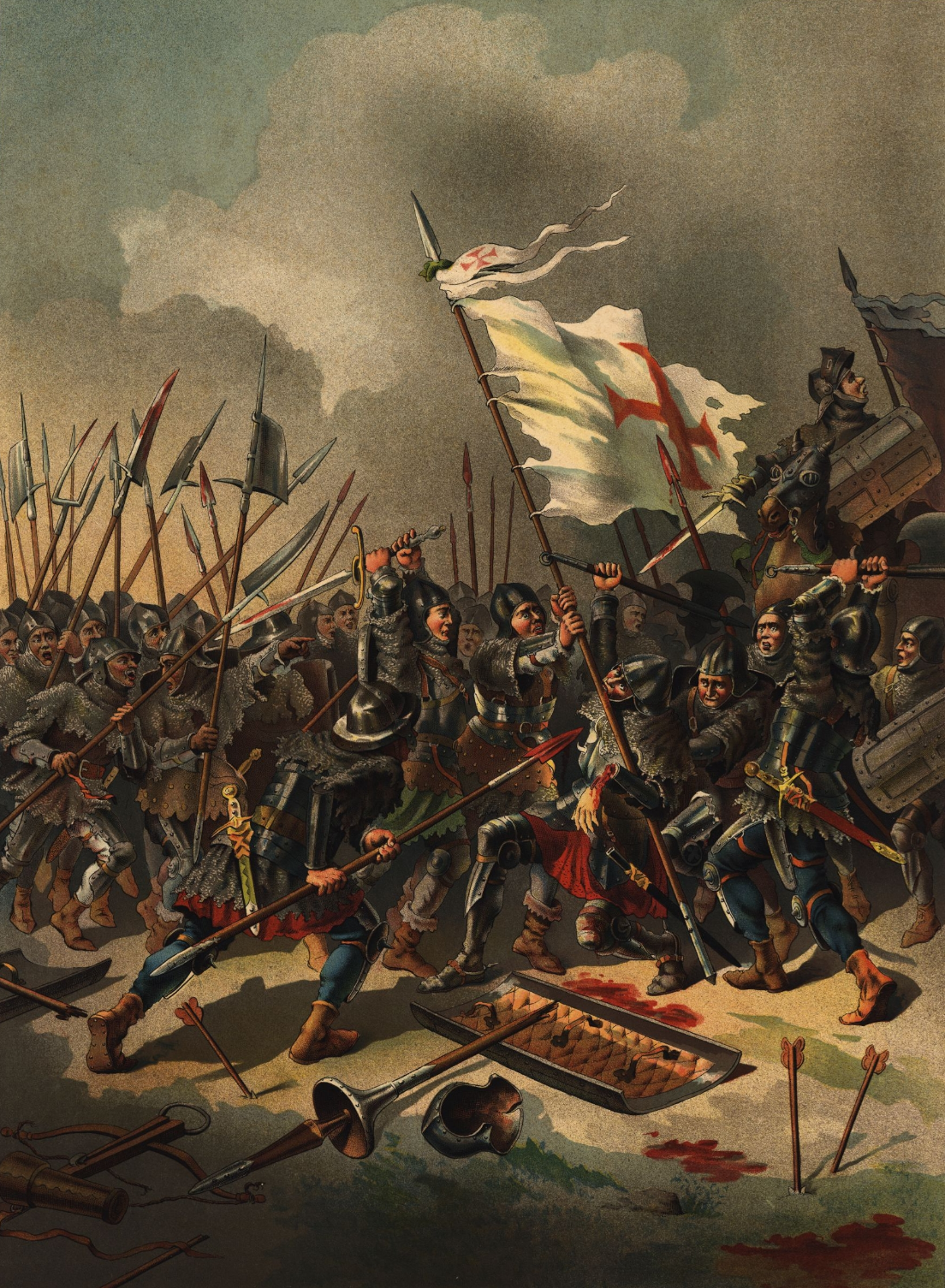
Heroic deed of Duarte de Almeida, «o decepado» («the mutilated»), a commemorative Portuguese lithography of the battle of Toro (late 19th century). The episode of the Portuguese royal standard, first taken by the Castilians and then retaken by the Portuguese illustrates the confusion of the struggle and the uncertain outcome of the battle of Toro.

Most of the Castilian chronicles also confirm the fact that the Castilians lost the Portuguese standard during the battle. However, the Castilian sources are contradictory in the details, and one of their chroniclers (Bernaldez) even wrote that the Portuguese ensign was killed, whereas he was captured and later returned to Portugal.

In his Chronicle, Pulgar, the official chronicler of the Catholic Monarchs, made an important correction to a previous account that he had provided a few years ago in a letter sent to the city of Murcia, pretending that after the battle, the Castilians owned half of the Portuguese royal standard (after two Castilian chevaliers had divided it into two pieces, one of them lost its part). Then a reward would have been announced and some time later a man with the other half would have appeared, and the two halves formed a whole again. However, it is very implausible that the two men dared to tear apart in two halves such a precious trophy, whose care had been entrusted to them by Cardinal Mendoza himself. Indeed, a few years later, after investigating the episode and many other facts in order to write his Chronicle of the reign of the Catholic Monarchs, Pulgar reviewed this first version and eventually stated plainly that Ferdinand's men simply lost the Portuguese royal standard in the battle of Toro, thus converging his own report with that of the Portuguese chroniclers and increasing its reliability since it included an embarrassing fact:

"And the standard of the King of Portugal was taken there by the Cardinal and by the men of arms of his guard. (...) And the Cardinal left that place and ordered two knights, Pedro de Velasco and Pero Vaca, to guard the standard, but they lost it again. And eight flags were taken to the Portuguese, which were taken to the city of Zamora. (...) And the Ensign that brought the standard of the King of Portugal was arrested and was taken to Zamora." (Hernando del Pulgar, Crónica de los Reyes Católicos)

However, other trophies were involved: in 1922 several academics among them Félix de Llanos y Torriglia studied a Portuguese banner hanging at the Chapel of the New Kings (Toledo's cathedral) and concluded that this banner was probably Castilian and probably from the 14th century (the Battle of Toro was fought during the 15th century). In 1945, Orestes Ferrara also investigated the banner and concluded that it couldn't be the Standard carried by Afonso V at the Battle of Toro. It is necessary to take into account that several Portuguese banners were captured in the battle (eight, according to Pulgar. Among them, and according to Palencia, was the minor Portuguese royal standard, as traditionally used by the Kings of Castile, which Afonso V assumed to be – and that may have been mistaken by some Castilians as the main Portuguese royal standard.). In their writings, both chroniclers Pulgar and Palencia as well as Ferdinand himself clearly differentiate the Portuguese royal standard from the Portuguese flags.

The loss of the Portuguese royal standard can also be demonstrated by its absence: writing during the last year of the war, the Isabela's partisan Bachilar Palma, describes in detail -as an eyewitness-, the triumph ceremony in the Cathedral of Toledo (2 February 1477, only 11 months after the battle), during which the most valuable trophies taken to the Portuguese were dragged to the ground and then hung over the tomb of King John I (whose memory was thus symbolically avenged, since he had lost the Castilian royal standard to the Portuguese in the battle of Aljubarrota, in 1385): only the armour of the Portuguese Alferez and several flags taken to Afonso V were there, but the Portuguese standard is not mentioned.

Thereby Isabella conceived the remaining fallback solution: an invasion of Portugal led by herself in order to retake the Castilian royal standard lost to the Portuguese on the battle of Aljubarrota. This plan -which was considered inappropriate to her feminine condition by chronicler Palencia and which involved numerous troops from many cities (1477), was soon abandoned.

In addition to the Portuguese chronicles, three Castilian chroniclers corroborate the episode of the recapture of the Portuguese standard – which is thus supported by contemporaneous sources on both sides:

Scholar Antonio de Nebrija (Castilian): "The Lusitanian standard is captured, which was a valuable insignia, yet by the negligence of Pedro Velasco and Pedro Vaca, to whom it was entrusted, as [already] mentioned, it is subsequently taken up by the enemy."

Chronicler Garibay (Spanish): "The king of Portugal (...) seeing lost, one first time, his Royal standard and captured the ensign, who was taken to Zamora and stripped of his weapons which ...were exposed in the Chapel of the New Kings, Toledo's Church, (...) even though the standard, for negligence (...) was taken by the Portuguese."

Royal Cosmographer and Chronicler Pedro de Medina (Castilian): "The Castilians invested the Portugal's standard ...and took it easily due to the cowardly and soft resistance from the ensign and its guards. The ensign was captured and later taken to Zamora...but the standard was not taken because...some Portuguese chevaliers regained it after fighting with bravery."

In medieval warfare, the royal standard was not a mere flag. Its loss was almost equivalent to losing the battle.

== The Battle of Toro in numbers ==
=== Time ===
All the chroniclers on both sides agree that the battle began just before sunset, which on 1 March occurs around 7:10 p.m. The fight would have taken between more than an hour (according to Damião de Góis), and far more than 3 hours. This chronicler -referring only to the struggle between both Royal battles-, wrote that "The indecisiveness of the outcome lasted for three hours, without victory leaning to either side ." But to this, we must add the time required for the prior defeat and chase of the Castilian right wing, the withdrawal of Alfonso V´men and their pursuit during the dark night into Toro −5 km away.

=== The size of the armies ===
Both armies had a similar number of men: around 8,000 soldiers.

According to Bernaldez, the only chronicler who gives total numbers, the Portuguese army had 8,500 men (3,500 horsemen plus 5,000 peons) while Ferdinand's army had 7,500 men (2,500 horsemen and 5,000 peons) when they left Zamora. So, the Portuguese army had a light advantage of 1,000 horsemen.

Bernaldez wrote that the Portuguese army who besieged Zamora had 8,500 men. The siege of this city started in the middle of February 1476 – fifteen days after the union of the reinforcements brought by the Perfect Prince with the royal army of Afonso V (end of January 1476) – and continued until the day of the battle (1 March 1476).Thus, 8,500 men is the total number for the combined Portuguese forces at the Battle of Toro since the Portuguese army who fought it was precisely the army who abandoned the Zamora siege and withdrew to Toro, where it was reached by the former besieged Isabelist army. From this initial number of 8,500 men, it is necessary to discount the losses by desertion, disease, and fight during the Zamora's siege, after 15 days of hard winter, putting the final figure in more than 8,000 Luso-Castilians.

From the Portuguese side, this number reflects the high desertion suffered by its initial army (14,000 footmen and 5,600 chevaliers – but many of them were used as garrison of strongholds and thus did not fight in the Battle of Toro), due to the unpopularity of the war among them. Especially after the failure of Burgos as it is told by Rui de Pina: "(...) many Portuguese without the will of serving the King came back to the kingdom [Portugal]". The Portuguese captains complained that while they were in Castile, their undefended lands in Portugal were set on fire and looted by the enemy. Other reasons were the high losses by disease, especially fevers from the hot and also because the Luso-Castilian army included many Castilian contingents who easily and massively changed sides after the aborted expedition to Burgos and its consequent fall on 28 January 1476. From all the great Castilian nobles who initially supported Juana, only the Archbishop of Toledo, Alfonso Carillo de Acuña was at the side of Afonso V on the day of the battle. After all, despite the reinforcement troops brought by Prince John, when the Battle of Toro was fought the invader army had suffered the erosion of 10 months of permanency in enemy territory.

Álvaro Lopes de Chaves, the most nationalist of the Portuguese chroniclers, wrote that the Castilian army had a small advantage of 700 to 800 chevaliers over the Portuguese army. Pulgar corroborates the similar size of both armies: "... there was little difference in the number of horsemen between both armies."

The high numbers involving dozens of thousands of men on each army as it is mentioned in some modern records of the Battle of Toro not only do not have documentary support but are also in direct contradiction with the Historical record: the contemporaneous chronicler Andreas Bernaldez, being a Castilian and a partisan of the Catholic Monarchs, cannot therefore be accused of pulling down the numbers of the armies present at the battlefield to reduce the triumph of his King Ferdinand at Toro.

Bernaldez is also corroborated by the partial numbers of the late chronicler Zurita for the horsemen of both armies: 3,000 chevaliers to Ferdinand and 3,500 chevaliers to Afonso V.

=== Losses ===
The total number of losses (dead and prisoners) was probably similar in both armies (but larger among the Juanistas) and wouldn't have been higher than one thousand men among the Portuguese-Castilians and many hundreds for the Isabelistas.

While Diego de Valera estimates 800 dead, Bernaldez mentions about 1,200 Portuguese dead (that's the version high Portuguese losses and low Castilian losses). But the version of great Portuguese losses / great Castilian losses is much more credible, not only because it is the only one supported by the sources of both sides (Pulgar and Á. Lopes de Chaves), but also because Bernaldez is contradicted by no less than six chroniclers (three Castilian and three Portuguese) who explicitly stated that the Castilian losses were high: Pulgar, Esteban de Garibay y Zamalloa, Pedro de Medina, Garcia de Resende, A. Lopes Chaves and Damião de Góis.

Pulgar states: "(...) and many were killed in one side and on the other side (...)."

Álvaro Lopes de Chaves, also an eyewitness of the campaign, adds:"(...) and on the battle there were many dead, prisoners and wounded in one side and on the other side."

As for prisoners, the available numbers are even scarcer. Chronicler Palencia wrote that when Afonso V returned to the city of Toro in the days immediately after the battle, he had wasted "an opportunity of stabbing or drowning in the river 500 enemies both infantry and chivalry [Castilian prisoners inside Toro]"., which would certainly be a revenge over men who had contributed to his defeat in the battle. Like all numbers related to the battle of Toro, there are no certainties, and this number of 500 Castilian prisoners should be considered as a maximum and possibly inflated.

The losses were relatively large comparing to the size of the armies in presence, but according to chronicler Juan de Mariana they were low in terms of absolute value for a battle with this political importance: "The killing was small compared with the victory, and even the number of captives was not large".

Besides the chronicles, there is additional evidence pointing to low losses in the Battle of Toro: during the Lisbon courts of 1476, the procurators of Évora called the attention of Prince John to the strong contingent given by the city to his father's army. This was natural because Évora was the second most populous Portuguese city of the 15th century. What is not expectable is that only 17 men from that contingent had died in the Battle of Toro, as the same procurators proudly declared. This number only makes sense if we accept that the Portuguese fatalities in battle were low.

== Aftermath and consequences ==
From a military perspective the Battle of Toro was inconclusive but politically the outcome was the same as it would have been if the battle was a military victory for the Catholic Monarchs, because all its fruits have fallen by their side. Isabella convoked courts at Madrigal where her daughter was proclaimed and sworn heiress of Castile's throne (April 1476).

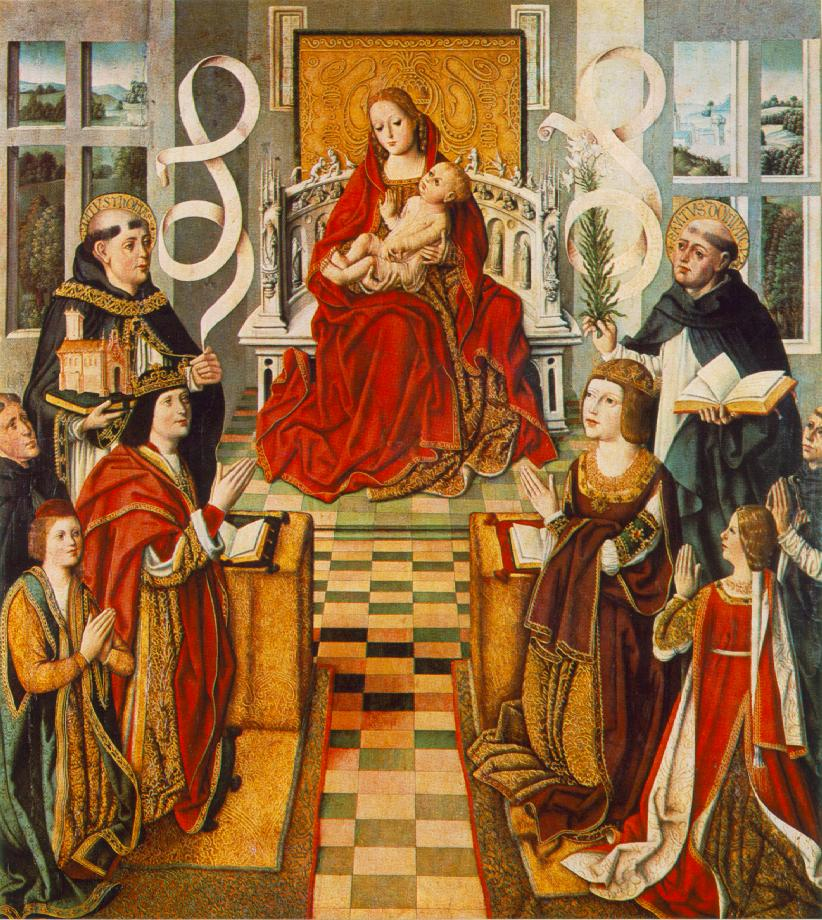
Madonna of the Catholic Monarchs, by Fernando Gallego, c. 1490–95.

After the battle, Afonso V – who wanted to avoid the renewal of the truces between France and Aragon, which would expire in July 1476 – became convinced that Portugal wouldn't be able to impose his niece's rights to the Castile's throne without external aid. So he departed to France seeking for help. The combined resources of Castile and Aragon had a population five times bigger and an area five times larger than that of Portugal.

Many nobles still loyal to Juana since the Burgos episode turned sides along the next months and years – like the Portocarrero and Pacheco-Girón families plus the hesitant Marquis of Cadiz – and the majority of the undecided cities and castles would bound to the Isabella's party specially the fortress of Zamora, Madrid and other places from the Central region of Castile. The turn of connections was a very slow process but ended with irreversible results.

However, the bulk of the Portuguese army stayed in Castile with Afonso V and Juana during more than 3 months after the Battle of Toro, until 13 June 1476. Rui de Pina and Damião de Góis wrote that only a small fraction of the Portuguese troops returned to Portugal with the Perfect Prince – one month after the battle, first days of April 1476 (Easter) – to organise the resistance of the undefended Portuguese frontier from the continuous Castilian attacks. According to Juan de Mariana they were only 400 horsemen.

In spite of having been weakened by the countless defections from the Juanistas to the Isabelistas, the Portuguese troops maintained a winning attitude especially in the district of Salamanca (and later around Toro), conquering and burning many castles and villages. The Portuguese army even organised two large military expeditions to capture King Ferdinand and then Queen Isabella (April 1476).

After the Battle of Toro Ferdinand's reinforced army did not attack the invading army, but with less risk besieged the Juanista strongholds (successfully even at length thanks to a clever policy of forgiveness) while negotiating with the rebel hidalgos.

The Catholic Monarchs' strategy proved to be right because time and resources were on their side: the terrible military pressure exercised over the Portuguese border lands (which defensive forces were in Castile at the service of Afonso V) together with the new front of the naval warfare (Isabella decided to attack the Portuguese at the heart of their power – the sea and the gold of Guinea) made inevitable the return of the Portuguese army to Portugal.

== Diplomatic solution at Alcáçovas ==
After the Battle of Toro the war continued, especially by sea (the Portuguese reconquest of Ceuta besieged and taken by the Castilians except for the inner fortress, the campaign of the Canary islands, and the decisive naval Battle of Guinea), but also in Castilian and Portuguese soil.

In 1477 a force of 2,000 Castilian knights commanded by the master of Santiago, Alonso de Cárdenas who invaded the Alentejo (Portugal) is defeated near Mourão: more than 100 Castilian knights were captured and the others fled, according to the chroniclers Garcia de Resende and Damião de Góis.

In 1479, the same master of Santiago defeats at Albuera a force of 700 or 1,000 (depending on the sources) Portuguese and allied Castilians who had invaded Extremadura (Castile) to help the rebel cities of Medellin and Mérida. According to Alfonso de Palencia the Portuguese-Castilians had 85 knights killed and few prisoners, but the bulk of that force reached those two cities where they resisted to fierce sieges by Ferdinand's forces until the end of the conflict, and thus increasing the bargaining power of Portugal during the peace negotiations and keeping the war's gravity centre inside Castile and out of doors. Except for those two cities on Extremadura and a few other places (Tui, Azagala, Ferrera and Montánchez), all the other strongholds occupied by the Portuguese in Castile ( Zamora, Toro and Cantalapiedra) as well as those occupied by their allied castilians (Castronuño, Sieteiglesias, Cubillas Villalonso, Portillo, Villaba) surrendered.

Nevertheless, all the strongholds occupied by the Castilians in Portugal (Ouguela, Alegrete and Noudar) were retaken by Prince John.

The exit from this impasse was reached through negotiations: the naval victory on the war allowed Portugal to negotiate its acquittal to the Castilian throne at the exchange of a very favourable share of the Atlantic and possessions.

On the other side, months before the start of peace negotiations the Catholic Monarchs reached two great victories: The acknowledgement of Isabella as Queen of Castile by the French King (treaty of Saint-Jean-de-Luz on 9 October 1478), who broke this way the alliance with Afonso V, leaving Portugal isolated facing Castile and Aragon.

The Pope Sixtus IV, changing his position, revoked the former bull authorising Juana's marriage with her uncle Afonso V. This way, the legitimacy of Afonso V as King of Castile fell by its foundations.

The final balance of the war became very similar to that of the Battle of Toro, without a conclusive victory to either of the sides: Castilian victory on the land and a Portuguese victory on the seas. In the peace Treaty of Alcáçovas, everybody won: Isabella was recognised Castile's Queen (in exchange for her acquittal to the Portuguese crown and the payment of a big war compensation to Portugal: 106.676 dobles of gold) and Portugal won the exclusive domain of the navigation and commerce in all the Atlantic Ocean except for the Canary Islands (in exchange for its eventual rights over those islands which remained to Castile). Portugal also reached the exclusive conquest right over the Kingdom of Fez (Morocco). Only D. Juana, la "Beltraneja" or "the Excellent Lady", has lost a lot as she saw her rights sacrificed to the Iberian states' interests.

== Propaganda ==
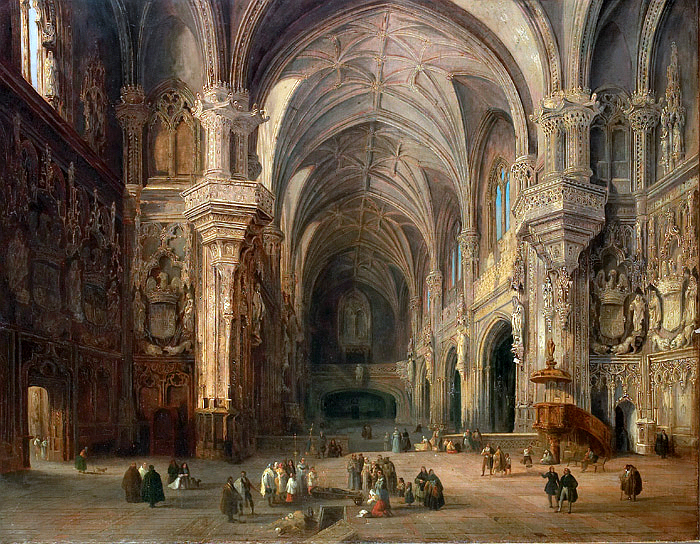
San Juan de los Reyes. It was a key monument of the propagandistic architecture of the Battle of Toro. The argument of victory was based on a very intuitive syllogism: If there was a battle at Toro and if Isabella was proclaimed Queen of Castile, so that implied that she had won it. The complex and polemic Battle of Toro was this way presented as a black and white picture, and the entire War reduced to its dynastic dimension ignoring its naval and colonial component.

As the Spanish academic Ana Isabel Carrasco Manchado summarised:

"The battle [of Toro] was fierce and uncertain, and because of that both sides attributed themselves the victory. (...). Both wanted to take advantage of the victory's propaganda."

Both sides used it. However, Isabella demonstrated a superior political intelligence and clearly won the propaganda's war around the result of the battle of Toro: during a religious ceremony at the Toledo's cathedral (2 February 1477), Isabella – who already had proclaimed herself Queen of Portugal – hung the military trophies taken from the Portuguese (flags and the armour of the ensign) at the tomb of her great grandfather Juan I, as a posthumous revenge for the terrible disaster of Aljubarrota.

Since then the chroniclers of the Catholic Monarchs followed the official version that the Battle of Toro (1476) was a victory which represented a divine retribution for the battle of Aljubarrota (1385): one of the chroniclers (Alonso Palma, in 1479) put it exactly as the title of his chronicle –"La Divina retribución sobre la caída de España en tiempo del noble rey Don Juan el Primero" ("Divine retribution for the defeat of Spain during the time of the noble King D. John the first").

After the letter sent in 1475 by Pulgar -whose chronicle seems to have been personally reviewed by Isabella, to Afonso V (invoking Aljubarrota, where "(...) fell that crowd of Castilians (...) killed"), the theme became recurrent.

This is well exemplified by Palencia, who not only frequently mentions Aljubarrota but also refers to the expedition that was planned by the inner circle of Isabella to send a great Castilian force to penetrate deeply into Portugal in order to recover the Castilian royal standard taken by the Portuguese at the Battle of Aljubarrota one hundred years before. There were many volunteers –hidalgos and cities like Seville, Jerez, Carmona, Écija, Cordova, and Badajoz. All this because, according to Palencia, this standard symbolised the "(...) eternal shame of our people" for the Castilian defeat at Aljubarrota.

This obsession with Aljubarrota clearly influenced the descriptions of the Battle of Toro in the Castilian chronicles.

It is important to the modern historical critic of the Battle of Toro to differentiate the facts from the official propaganda of the 15th and 16th centuries and to confront these records with those of the enemy side: for example with the chapter "How the Prince won the Battle of Toro and remained in the battlefield without contradiction" from the chronicle "Life and deeds of King D. John II" of the Portuguese chronicler Garcia de Resende.

Besides literature, architecture was also used for propaganda and was influenced by Aljubarrota. The construction of the Monastery of San Juan de los Reyes (to celebrate the battle of Toro and the birth of Prince John) was mainly a response to the Monastery of the Battle, built by the Portuguese to commemorate Aljubarrota, and like the Portuguese one it was also conceived to be a royal pantheon.

On the other side, the Portuguese chroniclers focused their attention on the victory of the Perfect Prince instead of the defeat of his King, Afonso V. And they also presented the Portuguese invasion of Castile as a just cause because it was made in the defence of the legitimate Queen against a "usurper" – Isabella.

In addition to the documents, there are also important indicators in assessing the outcome of the battle of Toro, like the attitude and behaviour of both armies in the weeks immediately after the battle, the invading army's length of stay in enemy territory, and even comparisons with other similar battles.

== The Battle of Toro as retribution to Aljubarrota ==
The Battle of Toro is frequently presented as a twin battle (with opposite sign) of the Battle of Aljubarrota. Politically the comparison is legitimate: both of them were Royal Battles which decided the fate of some Peninsular Kingdoms in a way that would prove to be favourable to the nationalist party. But on military terms the difference is large

Besides Afonso V's defeat, Pulgar reports that a part of the Portuguese army (his left side led by the Perfect Prince) defeated during the Battle of Toro a part of the Isabelista army: its right side, and he gives a justification for that.

That's corroborated by all the four Portuguese chroniclers, and also by Zurita and Mariana, who respectively added that, after this, the Prince's forces remained "always in good order", and "without suffering defeat", during the whole battle (or "intact", according to Pedro de Medina).

The Portuguese-Castilians became masters of the battlefield according to all the Portuguese chroniclers and also to Pulgar, Bernaldez and Mariana who revealed that "the Portuguese sustained their positions during more time".

Both Kings Ferdinand and Afonso left the battlefield of Toro (to Zamora and Castronuño respectively) in the night of the battle according to all chroniclers of both sides and the Portuguese recovered its lost royal standard.

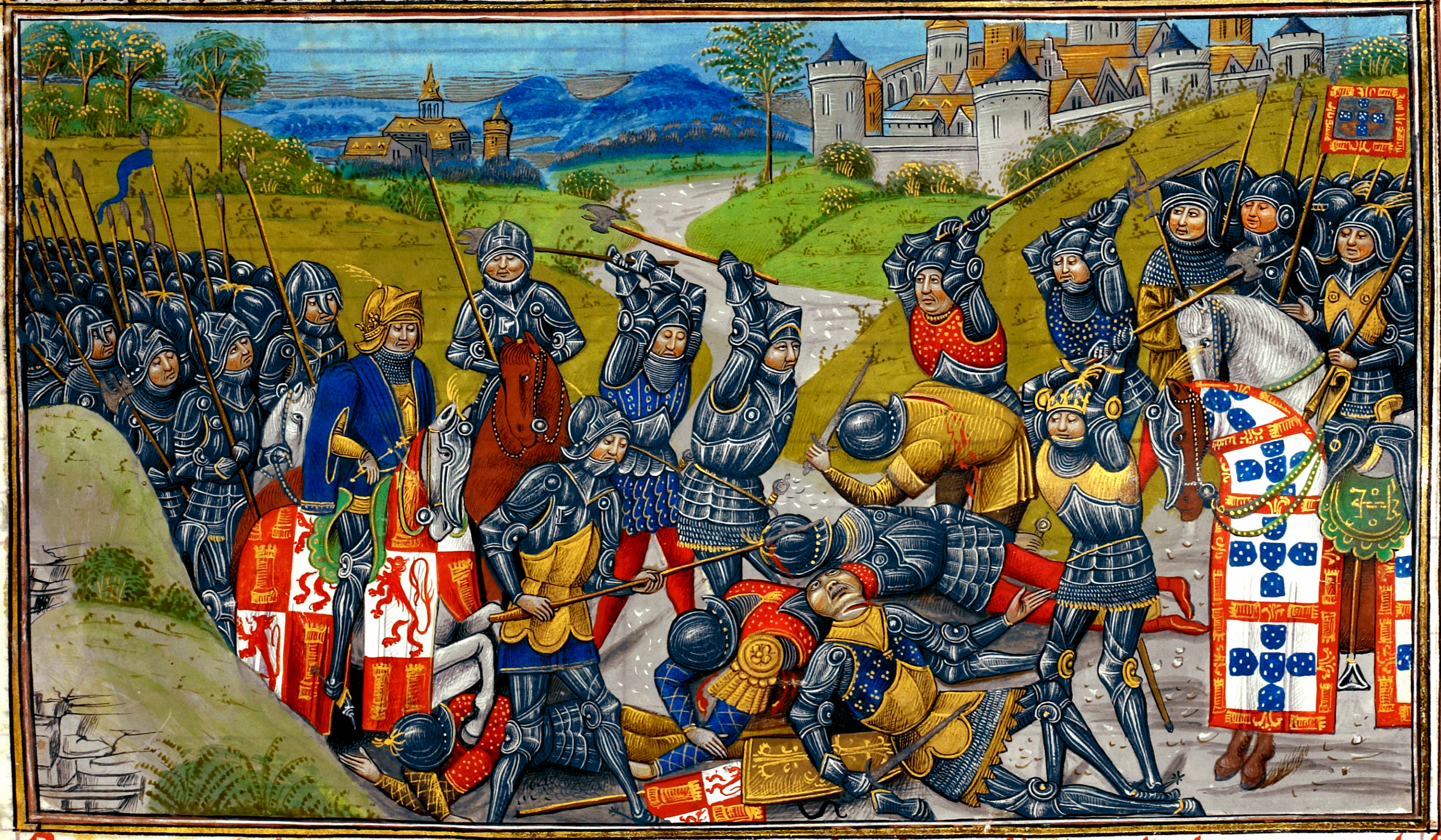
Battle of Aljubarrota, 1385: a constant shadow in the historic memory of the Catholic Monarchs chroniclers, who like all the new dynasties after a civil war, needed a "foundational myth". The Battle of Toro was the perfect choice: it reflected the God's will and was presented as a victory that avenged Aljubarrota.

At the Battle of Aljubarrota all the parts of the Franco-Castilian army were defeated: vanguard, royal battle and right wing. At the end of the battle, the only Castilian soldiers present at the battlefield were dead or imprisoned, and the Portuguese King plus his army remained there for 3 days. The Castilian royal standard was taken to Lisbon and 12 hours after the battle Juan I left Portuguese soil taking refuge in his mighty armada which was besieging Lisbon (3 days later he sailed towards Castile) – while his entire army fled to Castile in the hours immediately after the battle. The Portuguese army invaded Castile and defeated a large Castilian army in the Battle of Valverde (mid October 1385).

After the Battle of Toro, the Afonso's V army stayed in Castile 3 1/2 months where it launched several offensives especially in the Salamanca's district and later around Toro. For that he was criticised by chronicler Damião de Góis: "[Afonso V] never stopped to make raids and horse attacks along the land, acting more like a frontier's captain than like a King as it was convenient to his royal person."

Shortly after the Battle of Toro (April 1476), the Portuguese army organised two large military operations to capture first King Ferdinand himself (during the siege to Cantalapiedra) and then Queen Isabella (among Madrigal and Medina del Campo). As noted by historian L. Miguel Duarte, this is not the behaviour of a defeated army.

On the other side, the Castilian army during those three months after the Battle of Toro, in spite of its numerical advantage – with the massive transferences from the Juanistas to the Isabelistas plus the departure of some troops back to Portugal with Prince John – and despite being impelled in its own territory, it neither offered a second battle nor attacked the invading army. This behaviour and attitude is an elucidative indicator of the outcome of the Battle of Toro.

There is also a number gap. In the Battle of Toro the proportion of both armies was practically 1:1, according to Bernaldez (7,500 Juanistas to 8,500 Isabelistas), Álvaro L Chaves and Pulgar, whereas at Aljubarrota that proportion was 5:1 according to Fernão Lopes (31,000 Franco-Castilians to 6,500 Anglo-Portuguese) or "at least 4:1" according to Jean Froissart. Elucidative is the attitude of the Castilian chronicler Pero López de Ayala, who besides being a military expert and a royal counsellor, participated on the Battle of Aljubarrota: he described minuciously the disposition and the numbers of the Anglo-Portuguese army but understandably he didn't say a word about the soldiers' number of his own army.

In the Battle of Toro the casualties (dead and prisoners) were similar in both armies according to Pulgar and Álvaro L. Chaves and were low to J. Mariana. According to Diego de Valera the Portuguese suffered 800 dead while Bernaldez, who doesn't quantify the Castilian losses, gives a total of 1,200 dead to the Portuguese.

At Aljubarrota, Fernão Lopes reveals that the Castilians lost 2,500 men at arms Plus a "huge crowd" of "little people", men without a (noble) name (foot men, javelin throwers, jennets) and in the subsequent 24 hours the fugitives suffered a terrible bloodbath in the neighbouring villages at the hands of the local.

The so-called "monk of Westminster", who wrote near 1390 possibly recording the testimony of English participants in the battle of Aljubarrota, puts the total losses (common people and men at arms) at more than 7,500 dead. (to Froissart they were 7 to 8 thousand dead).

As for the prisoners, Ximenes de Sandoval, the great Aljubarrota Spanish expert, estimated in his classic work the grand total for the Franco-Castilian losses: 10,000 men: 3,000 dead on the battlefield plus 3,000 dead on the near villages and 4,000 prisoners.

Only losses of this magnitude could justify the national mourning decreed by Juan I –which lasted two years – and also the prohibition to participate in any public and private feast during that time: "Nowadays, our kingdom has suffered such great loss of so many and so important Knights like those who died on the present war [with Portugal] and also because in this time came such great dishonour and ruin to everyone of our kingdom that it is great the pain and shame residing in our heart." (Juan I at the Valladolid courts −1385, December).

Ten days after the Battle of Toro, a few Portuguese deserters were imprisoned when they tried to reach Portugal through Sayago, on the frontier, and some of them were killed or castrated.

Desertion among the Portuguese was very high before the Battle of Toro, especially after the Burgos episode, and after this battle the number increased: "And many of the Portuguese that left the battle returned to Portugal whether on foot or by horse.", wrote Pulgar.

When some Portuguese proposed to buy a free transit document (one silver royal for each man) to avoid fighting, the Cardinal Mendoza counselled Ferdinand to send an order to spare any prisoner and to not offer resistance to those Portuguese who tried to cross the frontier, because other way, they would have no alternative except to fight and thereby prolonging the war and destruction inside Castile: "when this was known to the King, it was debated in his council if they should permit the returning of the Portuguese to Portugal in security. Some chevaliers and other men from the King's army whose sons and brothers and relatives were killed and wounded on the battle (...) worked to provoke the King (...). And brought into the King's memory the injuries and the cruel deaths inflicted by the Portuguese to the Castilians in the battle of Aljubarrota (...).The cardinal of Spain said: (...) Pero Gonzalez de Mendoza my great grandfather, lord of Aleva, was killed on that so called battle of Aljubarrota (...) and in the same way perished some of my relatives and many of Castile's important personalities. (...) do not think in revenge (...). It is sure that if the passage was made impossible for those [Portuguese] who go, they will be forced to stay in your kingdoms, making war and bad things (...). After hearing the cardinal's reasons, the King sent an order to not preclude the passage of the Portuguese, and to not cause them harm in any way." (Pulgar). It was a variant of the principle attributed to Sun Tzu: "when enemy soldiers leave your country cover them with gold", except that in this case it was the enemy soldiers who left silver in Castilian territory in exchange for their free transit.

This situation of the Portuguese deserters trying to cross the frontier by their own risk, several days after the Battle of Toro, is not comparable to the bloodbath suffered by the Castilian fugitives at the hands of the population in the 24 hours after the Battle of Aljubarrota. After all, those Portuguese deserters had some capability to make war and antagonise the Castilians who might try to capture them (as Cardinal Mendoza himself admitted), whereas near the Aljubarrota battlefield the Castilian soldiers' thought was to survive the carnage. Their bargaining power and silver were useless.

In the Portuguese historiography and imaginary, the Battle of Toro wasn't considered a defeat but an inconclusive engagement or even a victory – and not just exclusively in Portugal, especially for those of the 15th to the 18th centuries.

In Castile the Battle of Aljubarrota was considered a national tragedy: Castilian chronicler Álvaro Garcia de Santa María reports that during the peace negotiations at 1431 (as late as nearly half a century after Aljubarrota) the members of the Castilian royal council didn't want to sign the peace treaty and offered a hard resistance because many of them "have lost their grandfathers, or fathers or uncles or relatives in the battle of Aljubarrota and wanted to avenge the great loss they had suffered on that occasion"

"Revenge" would finally come two centuries after Aljubarrota at the Battle of Alcântara (1580) when a Spanish army defeated the Portuguese supporters of António, Prior of Crato and incorporated Portugal into the Iberian Union.

== A royal letter contradicted by the chroniclers ==
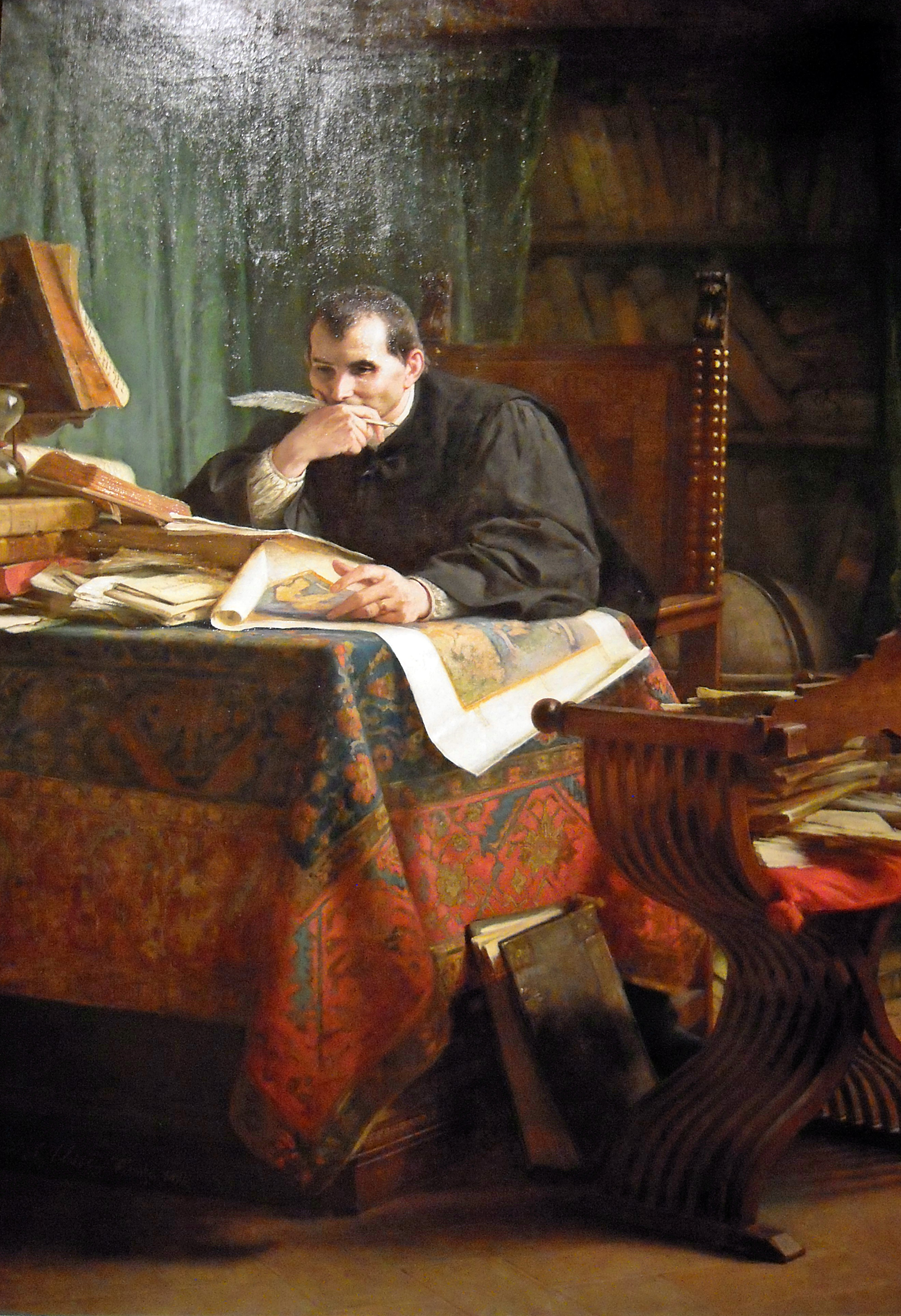
Niccolò Machiavelli nello studio, Stefano Ussi, 1894. Machiavelli was a great admirer of Ferdinand's methods

Next day, Ferdinand sent a letter claiming victory to the cities of Castile. Although contradicted by his own chroniclers in many ways, his letter is considered a masterpiece of political propaganda. It complies with his practical concept of truth, as in another context: "The King of France complains that I have twice deceived him. He lies, the fool; I have deceived him ten times and more". Machiavelli, who studied Ferdinand's career and relished his cunning, called him "the foremost king in Christendom". For his part, Prince John sent a victory letter to the main Portuguese cities and that omitted the defeat of his father's troops.

Examples of Ferdinand's account being contradicted, by both Portuguese and his own chroniclers, are the death of the Portuguese standard-bearer Duarte de Almeida; the complete omission of Prince John's victory over his right wing; the retreat of his remaining forces when faced by Prince John in the battlefield; and the recovery of the royal standard by the Portuguese.

According to Nebrija: "The Lusitanian standard is captured, which was a valuable insignia, yet by the negligence of Pedro Velasco and Pedro Vaca, to whom it was entrusted, as [already] mentioned, it is subsequently taken up by the enemy". Pedro de Medina said: "The Castilians invested the Portuguese standard...and took it easily due to the cowardly and soft resistance from the ensign and its guards. The ensign was captured and later taken to Zamora...but the standard was not taken because...some Portuguese chevaliers regained it after fighting with bravery". In Esteban de Garibay's account, he says: "The king of Portugal (...) seeing lost, one first time, his Royal standard and captured the ensign, who was taken to Zamora and stripped of his weapons which ...were exposed in the Chapel of the New Kings, Toledo's Church, (...) even though the standard, for negligence (...) was taken by the Portuguese".

Ferdinand also omitted his personal withdrawal from the battlefield ahead of his own army, saying that he was in control of the field for three or four hours after the battle. According to timings provided by Castilian chronicler Hernando del Pulgar, that is impossible. In addition, Pulgar explicitly states that Ferdinand promptly withdrew to Zamora before Cardinal Mendoza, the Duke of Alba and his army. Pulgar's version is supported by another Castilian, Alfonso de Palencia, whose timings indicate an early withdrawal by Ferdinand. In addition, the timing given by Jerónimo Zurita y Castro in his Anales de la Corona de Aragon strongly supports the conclusion that Ferdinand left the battlefield soon after the beginning of the battle. Ferdinand's army returned to Zamora by the same route as they came. They travelled at night in complete darkness on wet ground caused by heavy rainfall. Consequently, they were exhausted by the march and the pursuit of the enemy from Zamora to the battlefield. According to Ferdinand, his army reached Zamora at 01:00 having travelled for at least six hours. It is therefore estimated that Ferdinand left the battlefield around 19:00 the previous evening, which matches the time given by the Portuguese chroniclers.

According to Garcia de Resende:

King Ferdinand, who, without fighting, was on a hill in the rear with a small battle, seeing the defeat inflicted by the Prince on his first two battles [the Castilian right wing was disposed in two lines: the first had five battles while the second had one battle], which had many more men than him [Prince John], and seeing his big battle [centre and left wing] fully agitated (…), it appearing to him that it would be defeated as well, he abandoned everything and quickly sheltered in Zamora with those who were with him.

Damião de Góis commented:

King Ferdinand, as already told, placed himself in the rearguard of all his army with a small division, but as soon as he knew that Prince John had defeated the first six divisions, and [seeing] the fate of his royal battle undecided because neither his nor that of Alfonso was winning, sent word to the Cardinal of Spain and the Duke of Alba to take command of the army and do whatever they thought necessary; and before the Portuguese started to disband … he went to Zamora with that small division which was in the rearguard in front of the entrance of the way through the mountains, reaching the city by night, without him or those with him knowing if they were winners or losers.

Some historians have critically accepted Ferdinand's letter as an impartial and reliable historical source, which is a tribute to Ferdinand's persuasive and convincing power.

== The Battle of Toro and modern Spain ==
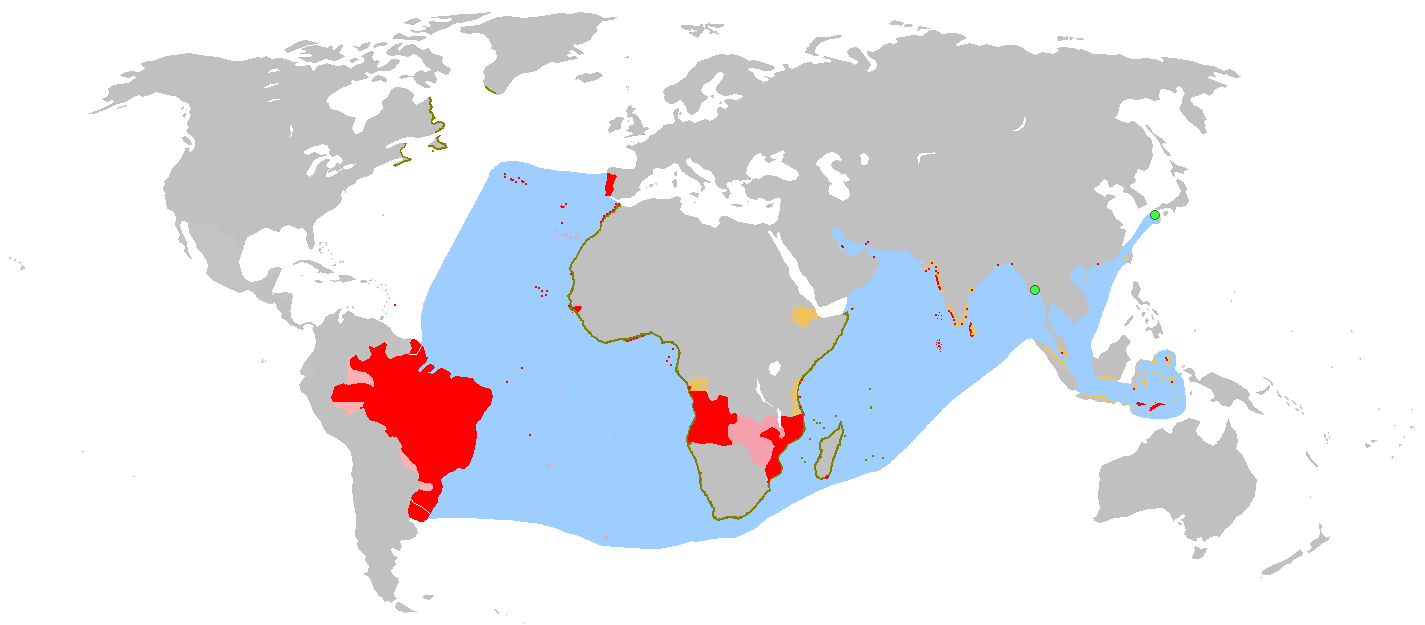
An anachronous map of the Portuguese Empire (1415–1999)

The great political genius of the Catholic Monarchs was to have been capable of transforming one inconclusive battle into a great moral, political, and strategic victory, which would not only assure them the crown but also create the foundations of the Spanish nation. The academic Rafael Dominguez Casas: "...San Juan de los Reyes resulted from the royal will to build a monastery to commemorate the victory in a battle with an uncertain outcome but decisive, the one fought in Toro in 1476, which consolidated the union of the two most important Peninsular Kingdoms."

Soon after came the Granada conquest, the discovery and colonisation of the New World, the Spanish hegemony in Europe, and at last the "Siglo de Oro" (Spanish Golden Age) whose zenith was reached with the incorporation of Portugal and its empire into the Iberian Union, creating a web of territories.

Nowadays, the relationship between Spain and Portugal is excellent and battles like the one of Toro seem part of a remote past: some Portuguese and Spanish commonly refer to each other by the designation of "nuestros hermanos", which means "our brothers" in Spanish.
