= Alfonso de Palencia =

Castilian royal secretary and scholar (1423–1492)

Alfonso Fernández de Palencia (July 21, 1423–1492) was a Castilian royal secretary, historian, and humanist scholar. He first served Enrique IV of Castile and later played an active role in the political intrigue that ultimately brought Fernando II to Castile and put Isabel I on the throne. His chronicles, the Décadas, are an important historical source for this period.

== Life ==
Alfonso de Palencia was born in Palencia in 1423, the son of a secretary. By 1440, at the age of seventeen, he was in the household of Alfonso de Cartagena, Bishop of Burgos. In 1441 he participated in a mission on behalf of King Juan II of Castile to meet with Álvaro de Luna, a powerful Castilian noble and a favorite of the king.

Later, Palencia traveled to Florence where he entered the service of Cardinal Bessarion, with whom he remained until 1453. He also became acquainted with Vespasiano da Bisticci and studied the humanities with George of Trebizond in Rome. After nearly ten years in Italy, Palencia returned to Castile and joined the household of the Archbishop of Seville, Alonso I de Fonseca.

On 6 December 1456 Palencia succeeded Juan de Mena as royal chronicler and secretary to Enrique IV of Castile. In the 1460s he openly sided with Castilian nobles in opposition to the king. Palencia visited Rome on behalf of these nobles to complain to Pope Paul II about Enrique's actions. He supported Prince Alfonso, Isabel's brother, when he proclaimed himself king in June 1465 and then shifted his allegiance to Fernando and Isabel when Alfonso died in 1468. He played a major role in smuggling Fernando into Castile for a marriage to Isabel in 1469.

During the War of the Castilian Succession, he served as a diplomat for Castile, assisting in the establishment of the Santa Hermandad in 1476 and the organization of naval reinforcements for the defense of Gran Canaria, a Castilian possession, in 1479. Palencia remained a strong supporter of Fernando but Isabel's councilors, especially Pedro González de Mendoza, were suspicious of Palencia's loyalties. In the 1480s Isabel appointed Fernando del Pulgar as her royal chronicler and Palencia was effectively stripped of political influence.

He died in 1492.

== Chronicles (Décadas) ==
His main work is the Gesta Hispaniensia ex annalibus suorum diebus colligentis, called, for short, his Décadas, because it was divided into decades in the style of Livy's work. This chronicle, written in Latin, covers the time from the end of the reign of John II of Castile to the year 1481, including the reign of Henry IV of Castile; Henry IV’s war with Prince Alfonso; the War of the Castilian Succession; the consolidation of Castile and Aragon under Ferdinand and Isabella; and the signing of the Treaty of Alcáçovas.

The work is divided into four decades, each one consisting of ten books except the fourth, which was left incomplete at Fernández de Palencia’s death, and consists of six books. The first three decades were translated into Spanish by Paz y Meliá and published under the title of Crónica de Enrique IV between 1904 and 1908. Most historians remained unaware of the fourth decade, which was published in 1971 by José López del Toro.

The other important work by Fernández de Palencia is his Anales de la Guerra de Granada, which concerns the Granada War from its beginnings until the taking of Baza in 1489. It was translated into Spanish by Paz y Meliá in 1909.

Fernández de Palencia also wrote Batalla campal entre los perros y los lobos (Pitched Battle Between the Dogs and the Wolves) (1457, which is a Castilian translation of his own Latin poem. It may be an allegory for the government of Henry IV of Castile. A wolf, Harpaleo, is killed by dogs after he is weakened by his neglect of military discipline. Fernández de Palencia also translated into Castilian his Latin work, the allegory Tratado de la perfección del triunfo militar (1459). A character named “Exercise” (el Ejercicio), accompanied by the wise Discretion (Discreción), tries to find the character named Triumph (el Triunfo). Triumph refers Exercise to a Roman captain named Gloridoneo, who may represent Alfonso V of Aragon. Gloridoneo is victorious in battle and Triumph grants victory to Order, Exercise, and Obedience –virtues which will help a king emerge victorious, advice that may have been directed to Henry IV.

The work Coplas del provincial (The Provincial’s Couplets) is attributed to him.

He also wrote lexicographical and linguistic works:

- Opus Synonymorum, also known as De sinonymis elegantibus, which concerns synonyms
- Uniuersale Compendium Vocabulorum (Vocabulario universal en latín y en romance) (Seville, 1490), bilingual Latin-Castilian dictionary, subsequently superseded by the work of Antonio de Nebrija.
- Compendiolum, a geographic and toponymic work
- Latin epistles

His work as a translator was also very important: he translated into Spanish Plutarch's Parallel Lives (Seville, 1491) and also Flavius Josephus' The Wars of the Jews (1492).

Sanchez Alonso writes that "few match Palencia's ability to give life to a character, in presenting the antecedents to an event briefly and efficiently, in sagaciously explaining it and in putting interest in the narration".

== Bibliography ==
English

- Tate, Robert B. (2003). "Palencia, Alfonso de". In Gerli, E. Michael (ed.). Medieval Iberia : an encyclopedia. New York: Routledge. p. 630. ISBN 0-415-93918-6. OCLC 50404104.

Spanish

- López del Toro, José, Cuarta Década de Alonso de Palencia (Madrid: Real Academia de la Historia) 1971 ISBN 84-600-6271-6
- Universal vocabulario en latín y en romance Madrid: Comisión Permanente de la Asociación de Academias de la Lengua Española, 1967, 2 vols.
