= Garcia de Meneses =

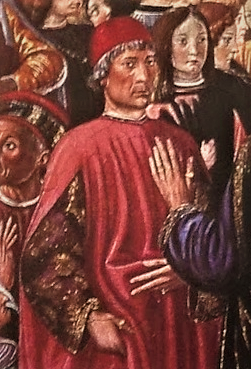
Detail from Cosimo Rosselli's Sermon on the Mount, painted 1481-82 on the Sistine Chapel, depicting Garcia de Meneses, Bishop of Évora.

Garcia de Meneses (Santarém, c. 1420 – Castle of Palmela, 1484) was a Portuguese Bishop and military commander.

== Biography ==
He was the son of military commander Duarte de Meneses, 3rd Count of Viana and his second wife, Dona Isabel de Castro. Consequently, he became well-versed in the military life from an early age, but, as the second son, he was destined for the priesthood.

He was appointed Bishop of Evora in 1471, and fought in the service of King Afonso V of Portugal at the Battle of Toro (1476). There, while positioned on the left flank of the Portuguese army (under the command of Prince John), he routed and pursued the right wing of the Castilian army and remained on the battlefield, with the Prince following the chaotic retreat of the remaining Castilian forces.

He executed a stratagem, devised by Prince John near Évora, that led to the defeat of a Castilian force, comprising 2,000 knights of the Order of Santiago commanded by Alonso de Cárdenas, by Portuguese knights under the command of Diogo de Castro at the Battle of Mourão (1477).

In 1479, he led a disastrous relief expedition—at the head of a small force of 500 Portuguese and 200 Castilian horsemen, to aid Dona Beatriz Pacheco, the Countess of Medellín in Castile. They were defeated and he was taken prisoner at the Battle of Albuera, but managed to escape by bribing his captor. Together with the bulk of the Portuguese troops, he reached the Countess's strongholds of Mérida and Medellín, where they successfully withstood the siege laid by the forces of the Catholic Monarchs until the Treaty of Alcáçovas, thereby strengthening Portugal's negotiating position.

In 1480, he commanded a Portuguese fleet that docked at Ostia in response to a call from Pope Sixtus IV, to help repulse the Ottoman conquest of Otranto. When the Portuguese fleet arrived in Otranto, the Turks had already left the city.

While passing through Rome again the following year, he secured appointments as an Assistant to the Pontifical Throne and as perpetual administrator of the Diocese of Guarda.

In 1484, he became involved in the Duke of Viseu's conspiracy against King John II. Imprisoned in Palmela Castle, he died soon after, presumably by poisoning.

Preceded by Álvaro Afonso	Bishop of Évora; 1471–1484	Succeeded by Afonso of Portugal
