= Crónica del Cid =

Crónica del Cid may refer to:

- Crónica rimada del Cid (c. 1360), cantar de gesta of El Cid
- Crónica popular del Cid (1498), biography of El Cid
- Crónica particular del Cid (1512), biography of El Cid
