= Battle of Guinea =

Battle in western Africa (1478)

Coordinates: 1°N 4°E

- Part of War of the Castilian Succession
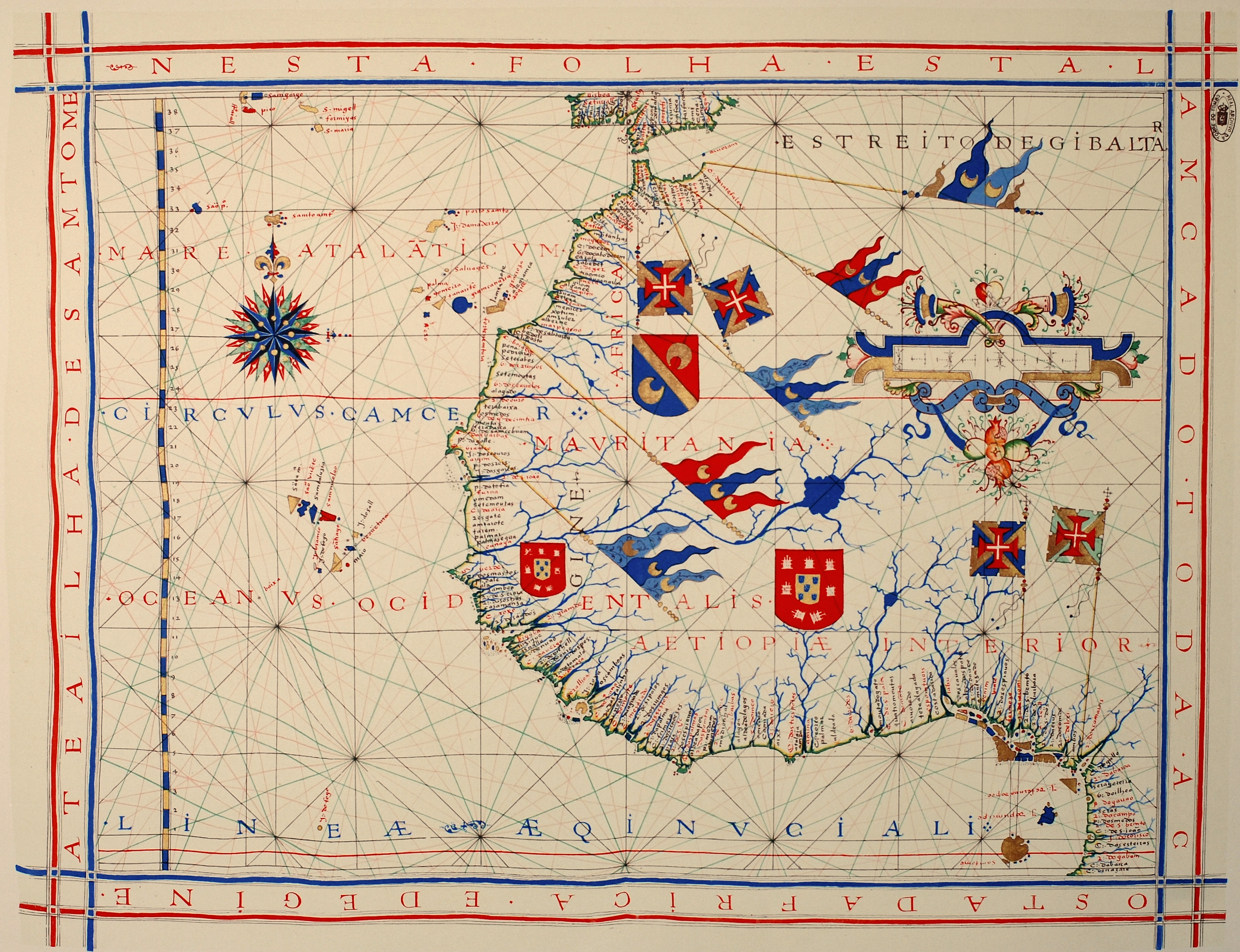
- 16th century map of the Portuguese possessions in western Africa
Date	Spring or Summer of 1478
Location	Near Elmina, Gulf of Guinea
Result	Portuguese victory

Belligerents
Kingdom of Portugal	Crown of Castile

Commanders and leaders
Jorge Correia; Mem Palha	Pedro de Covides (POW); Joanot Boscà (POW)

Strength
11 ships	11~35 ships

Casualties and losses
No ships lost	All ships, crew and guns captured; A huge cargo of gold captured

The Battle of Guinea took place on the Gulf of Guinea, in West Africa, 1478, between a Portuguese fleet and a Castilian fleet in the context of the War of the Castilian Succession.

The outcome of the battle of Guinea was decisive for Portugal, continuing its dominance of the Atlantic Ocean, and reaching a very favourable sharing of the Atlantic and territories disputed with Castile in the Peace of Alcáçovas (1479). All with the exception of the Canary Islands stayed under Portuguese control: Guinea, Cape Verde, Madeira, Azores, and the exclusive right of conquering the Kingdom of Fez. Portugal also won exclusive rights over the lands discovered or that were to be discovered south of the Canary Islands.

== Background ==
In 1478, Prince John of Portugal, who had been charged since 1474 by his father, King Afonso V of Portugal, with the administration of the Portuguese maritime expansion, received news that a large Castilian fleet of up to thirty five ships commanded by Pedro de Covides had been sent from Seville by Isabella I of Castile and Ferdinand of Aragon to Portugal's claimed Mina, in the region of the Gulf of Guinea, to attack the Portuguese there and trade with the natives. He immediately prepared and organized a fleet of eleven ships with the objective of intercepting the Castilian expedition, giving the command of the fleet to Jorge Correia and Mem Palha, two of his knights.

== Portuguese arrival and battle ==
When the Portuguese fleet of eleven ships arrived at the Gulf of Guinea, the Castilians were already in the area for about two months trading with the Africans. Cheap goods like shells, old clothes, brass bracelets, and other items were being traded in exchange for gold.

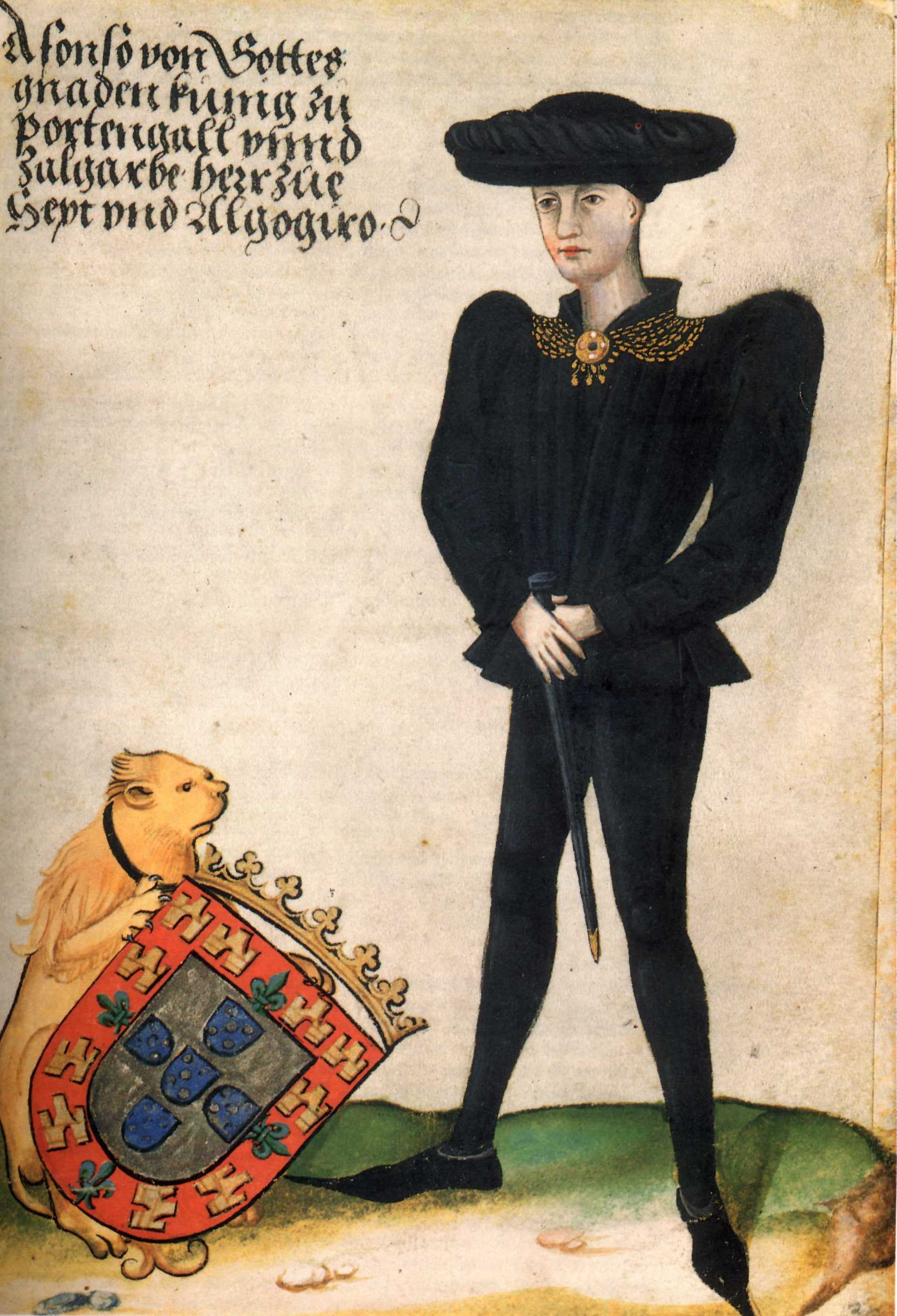
15th-century painting of King Afonso V of Portugal

The Castilian fleet was anchored in a harbor near Mina when the Portuguese fleet initiated an attack early in the morning. The Castilians were caught by surprise and ended up being quickly and totally defeated, being forced to surrender to the Portuguese, who without much harm to themselves were able to capture the entire Castilian fleet along with its large cargo of gold.

== Aftermath ==
The captured fleet was then taken to Lisbon. The large amount of gold captured by the Portuguese was enough to finance King Afonso's military campaign in Castile.

At the end of the war, the Portuguese exchanged the Castilian prisoners of the captured fleet for the Portuguese prisoners captured in the Battle of Toro.

In the following year, the Treaty of Alcáçovas was signed between Portugal and Castile, where King Afonso V of Portugal gave up his claim to the Castilian throne, recognizing the Catholic Monarchs as sovereigns of Castile and abandoning his claim to the Canary Islands, while Queen Isabella I of Castile recognized the Portuguese hegemony in the Atlantic Ocean, confirming Portuguese sovereignty over Madeira, Azores, the Cape Verde Islands, and the:

"...lands discovered and to be discovered, found and to be found... and all the islands already discovered and to be discovered, and any other island which might be found and conquered from the Canary Islands beyond toward Guinea..."

== See also ==
- History of Portugal
- Portuguese Empire
- House of Avis
- Henry the Navigator
- Age of Discovery
- Treaty of Tordesillas
- Elmina Castle
