= Garcia de Resende =

Portuguese poet and editor (1470–1536)

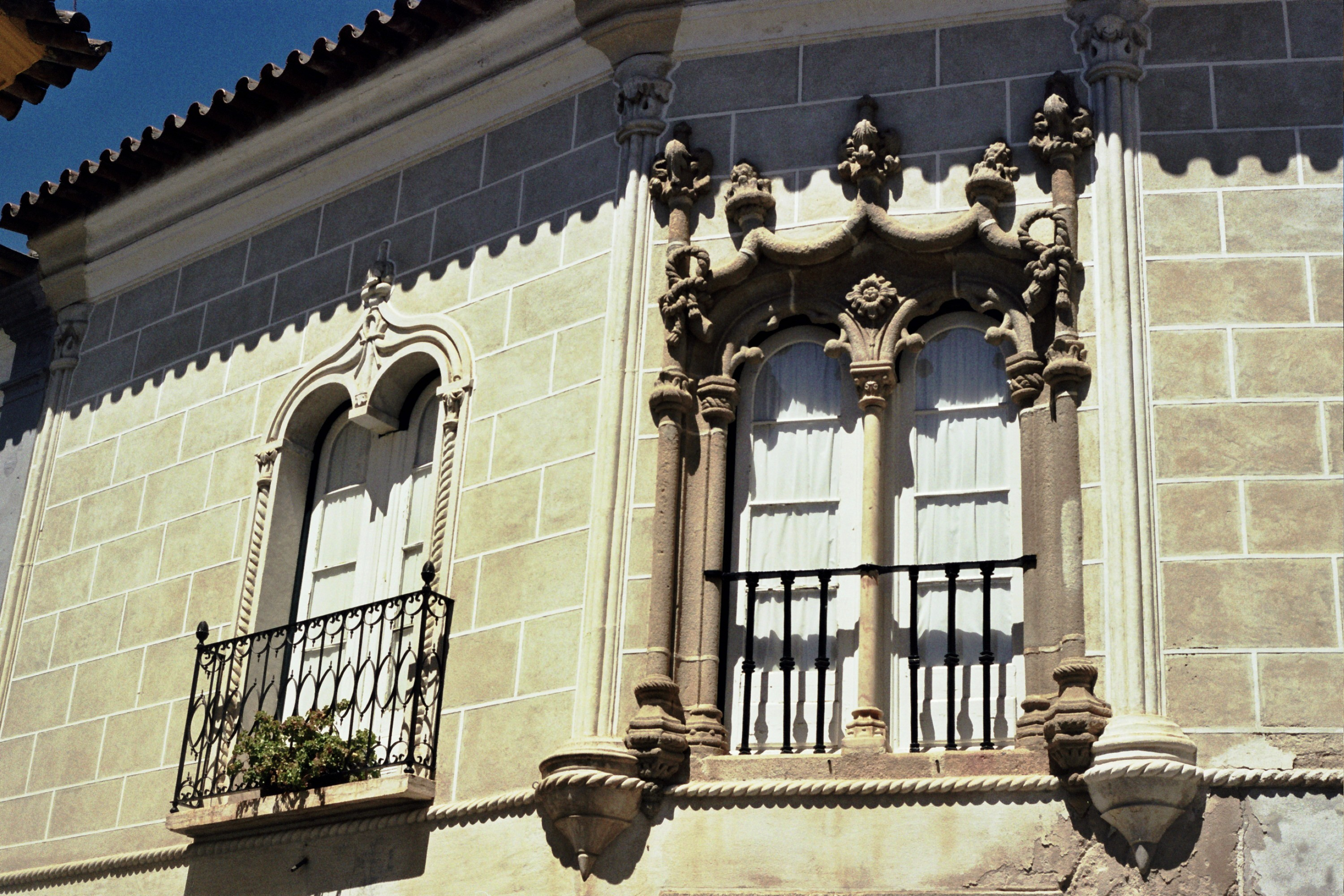
- House of Garcia de Resende, Évora
- Born: 1470; Évora, Portugal
- Died: 3 February 1536 (aged 65–66); Évora, Portugal
- Occupations: Poet, editor, musician and arquitect

Garcia de Resende (1470 – 3 February 1536) was a Portuguese poet, editor, musician and arquitect. He served John II as a page and private secretary. After John's death, he continued to enjoy the same favour with Manuel I, whom he accompanied to Castile in 1498, and from whom he obtained a knighthood in the Order of Christ.

In 1514, Resende went to Rome with Tristão da Cunha, as secretary and treasurer of the embassy sent by the king to offer tribute to Pope Leo X. In 1516 he was given the rank of a nobleman of the royal household, and became escrivão de fazenda to Prince John, afterwards King John III, from whom he received further pensions in 1525.

Resende built a chapel in the monastery of Espinheiro near Évora, the pantheon of the Alentejo nobility, where he was buried.

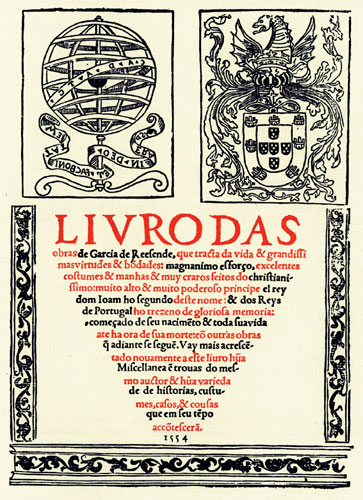
Works of Garcia de Resende. In the Miscelânia, he defends Gil Vicente as the "father of Portuguese theatre".

== Poetry ==
He began to cultivate the making of verses in the palace of John II, and he reported that how one night when the king was in bed he caused him Resende to repeat some "trovas" (troubador songs) of Jorge Manrique, saying it was as needful for a man to know them as to know the Pater Noster. Under these conditions, Resende grew as a poet, and moreover distinguished himself by his skill in drawing and music; while he collected into an album the best court verse of the time. This was the Cancioneiro Geral (General Songbook), probably starting in 1483, though not printed until 1516, which includes the compositions of some three hundred fidalgos of the reigns of kings Afonso V, John II, and Manuel I.

The main subjects of its pieces are love, satire and epigram; and most of them are written in the national redondilha verse, but the metre is irregular and the rhyming careless. The Spanish language is largely employed, because the literary progenitors of the whole collection were Juan de Mena, Jorge Manrique, Boscán and Garcilaso. As a rule the compositions were improvised at palace entertainments, at which the poets present divided into two bands, attacking and defending a given theme throughout successive evenings. At other times these poetical soirées took the form of a mock trial at law, in which Eleanor, the queen of John II, acted as judge. Resende was mocked by other rhymesters about his corpulence, but he repaid all their gibes with interest.

The linguist Edgar Prestage gives an assessment of the Cancioneiro Geral in the Encyclopædia Britannica Eleventh Edition.
