= Crónica popular del Cid =

A lion interrupts a game of backgammon in this illustration from the 1525 Cromberger edition.

The Coronica del Çid Ruy Diaz, commonly called the Crónica popular del Cid, is an anonymous Spanish biography of El Cid published with woodcut illustrations at Seville in 1498. It provides a novelesque account of the hero's life, drawn largely from chapters 38–104 of Diego de Valera's Crónica de España abreviada of 1481, which itself relies on the Crónica geral de Espanha de 1344 for its coverage of the life of El Cid. It went through at least fifteen editions by 1627, including a 1525 printing by Jacobo and Juan Cromberger of Seville under the title Crónica del muy esforçado cauallero el Cid Ruy Díaz Campeador.
