= Diego de Valera =

Spanish historian

Mosén Diego de Valera (1412–1488) was a nobleman, writer, and historian from the Crown of Castile who has been described as having had "chivalrous adventures" that took him "as far as Bohemia" where he was a participant in the Hussite Wars. He authored letters to Spanish Kings John II of Castile and Henry IV of Castile admonishing them to remember rulers who had been deposed for poor governance. He reminded the latter of various Old Testament kings who were chosen to rule, but were deposed nonetheless, and of thirteen Gothic kings who died at the hand of their vassals due to despotic government. Without necessarily approving rebellion and deposition, he implied that such was the common fate of unworthy kings. His warning did not prevent King Henry IV from being deposed in 1465.

One treatise written by Valera, Espejo de verdadera nobleza (1439–41), challenged some of the preconceived notions concerning nobility. Valera argues in favor of "true nobility" based on virtue and education in place of the medieval concept of "blood" nobility, showing the influence of Renaissance humanism in the early decades of fifteenth-century Castile. He also wrote one of the first known books on fencing, Treatise on Arms, and a short history of Spain, the Crónica de España abreviada (1481), which itself relies on the Chronicle of 1344. His chronicle was used as the main source for the Crónica popular del Cid (1498).

== Early life ==
Diego de Valera was born in 1412, probably in Cuenca, Spain and died in 1487 or 1488 in El Puerto de Santa María. His father was Alonso Chirino, doctor to Henry III and John II. From a very young age he entered the service of John II, in 1429 was appointed servant of Prince Henry and was knighted in 1435.

== Career ==
He took several trips abroad that influenced his later writings. Between 1437 and 1438, he undertook the first two; to France and Bohemia, where he made use of his skills as a mediator, and reading legal books in Latin and managed to intervene favourably between the king of Castile and the count of Bohemia. Before returning from the trip, Albert II granted him his badge, and upon his return to Castile, he received from John II the necklace of the Scale, the tournament helmet and the title of Mosén.

In 1442, by order of John II, he was sent to visit the queen of Denmark, the king of England and also the duke of Burgundy, returning by 1445. At the beginning of 1447, being a procurator in Cuenca and after intervening in the courts with brief speeches, he addressed a letter to the king emphasizing the need to preserve peace with France. The letter caused such an impact that a copy was brought into the hands of the noble Don Pedro de Estúñiga, who entrusted him with the education of his grandson.

In mid-1462 Diego was a corregidor in Palencia, according to a letter addressed to Henry IV. After five years, he entered the service of the house of Medinaceli, for which he served as mayor of Puerto de Santa María. At the same time, a civil war took place between Henry IV and his half-brother Alfonso. Both Diego de Valera and the Medinaceli family were on the side of Prince Alfonso. After the accession of the Catholic Monarchs in 1474, Valera ended up belonging to the Council of Castile.

== Books ==
- Memorial de diversas hazana: Crónica De Enrique IV (published by Espasa Calpe, 1491)
- Espejo de verdadera nobleza (published by Atlas, 1959; ed. by Mario Penna)
