= Manuel Fernández Álvarez =

Spanish author

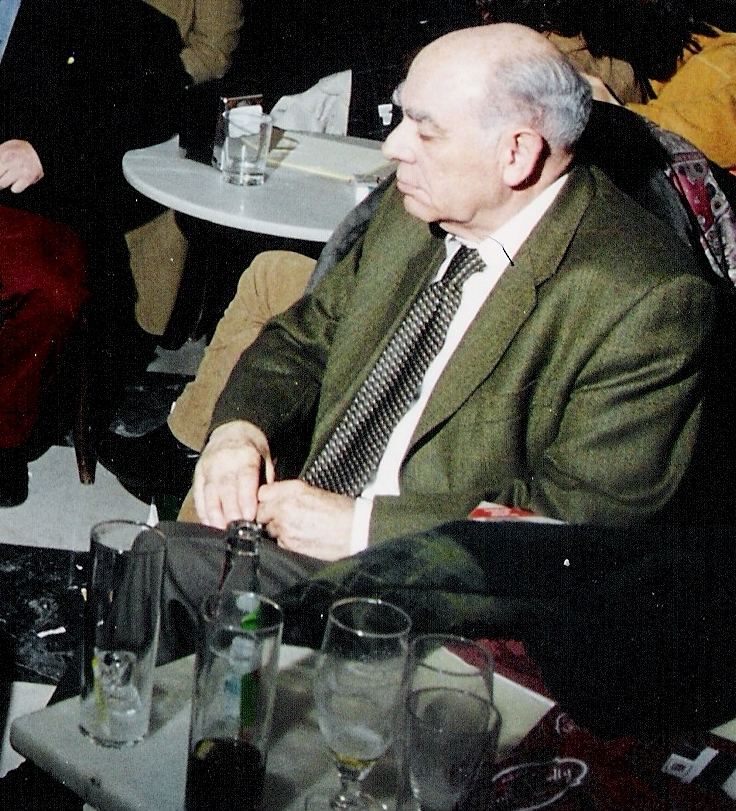
- Manuel Fernández Álvarez in 1995
- Born: 7 November 1921; Madrid, Spain
- Died: 19 April 2010 (aged 88); Salamanca
- Education: Universidad de Valladolid
- Children: María Fernández; Susana Fernández
- Scientific career
- Fields: History

Manuel Fernández Álvarez (7 November 1921 – 19 April 2010) was a Spanish historian, academic and writer.

== Biography ==
He was the son of Enrique Fernández and María Álvarez.

In 1942 he graduated in Philosophy at the University of Valladolid.

He was professor at the University of Salamanca (and after retirement profesor emérito).

He died on 19 April 2010 aged 88 due to a complication after a heart surgery.

== Books ==
- La sociedad espanola en el Siglo de Oro
- La sociedad espanola del Renascimiento, 1985
- Carlos V, el cesar y el hombre, 2000
- Corpus monumental de Carlos V, Salamanca, 1973-1981
- Carlos V: un hombre para Europa
- Isabel la Catolica
- Felipe II y su tiempo
- La Gran Aventura de Cristobal Colon, Espasa-Calpe, 2006
