= Hernando del Pulgar =

Castilian royal secretary, historian, and writer

Hernando del Pulgar (1436 – c. 1492), also spelled as Fernando de Pulgar, was a Castilian royal secretary, historian, and writer. He first served in the administration of Enrique IV of Castile and later was appointed by Isabel I to serve as her royal chronicler. His best known work, Claros varones de Castilia, presents a series of biographical sketches of some of the most important nobles and prelates of the era.

== Biography ==
Hernando del Pulgar was born around 1420 at Pulgar in Castile. His father, Diego Rodriguez de Toledo, was a court scribe. Pulgar was educated in the chancery of John II. Starting around 1457, he was a secretary in the chancery for Henry IV. After the accession of Isabel he became a councilor of state, was charged with a mission to France, and in 1480 was appointed the official chronicler for the queen. From that point on, he spent his time on the preparation of historical documents. He is said to have died of old age around 1490 in Villaverde, a village near Madrid.

== Works ==
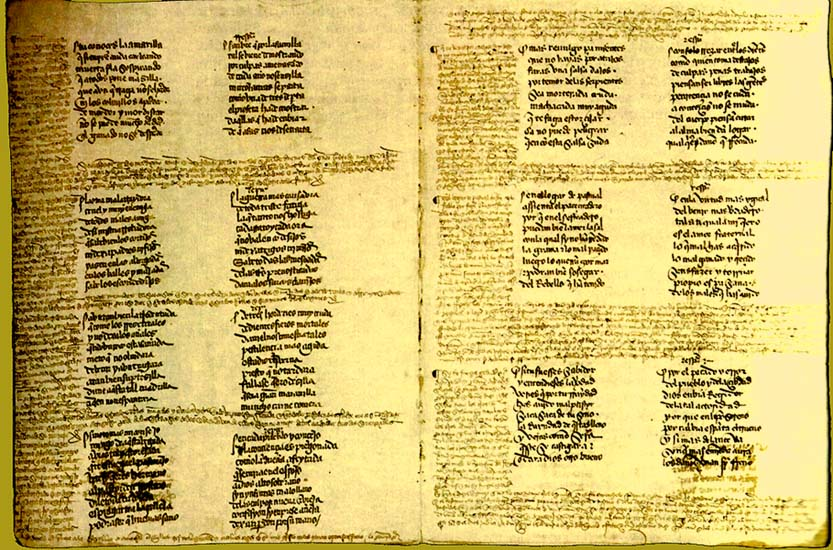
Coplas de Mingo Revulgo, glossed by Fernando de Pulgar.

His Crónica de los Reyes Católicos, was wrongly ascribed in the first printed edition (1545) to Antonio de Nebrija, who had composed a Latin history based on Pulgar's manuscript. This work is commonly supposed to be propaganda for his patrons, Catholic Monarchs of Spain Queen Isabella and King Ferdinand. Nevertheless, it has been argued that it is often critical of their policies and admonitory in its insistence that monarchs need to respect moral and spiritual ideals.

Pulgar's Claros varones de Castilla (1486), a series of portraits of eminent nobles, ecclesiastics, and men of learning, provides interesting insights into the court of Henry IV. These portraits were published together with Pulgar's Letras (Burgos, 1486), a body of epistolary work composed of 32 letters directed to both well-known and anonymous correspondents. This epistolary is one of few 15th century collections composed in a Romance language and are an example of Humanistic prose of the Renaissance. Pulgar also composed a gloss (ca. 1485) on the ''Coplas de Mingo Revulgo'', a work attributed to either Iñigo de Mendoza or Pulgar's brother.
