= Torrecilla =

Torrecilla or Torrecillas may refer to:

== Places ==
=== Puerto Rico ===
- Torrecilla Alta, Canóvanas, Puerto Rico, a barrio
- Torrecilla Alta, Loíza, Puerto Rico, a barrio
- Torrecillas, Morovis, Puerto Rico, a barrio

=== Spain ===
- La Torrecilla, a mountain in Andalusia
- Torrecilla de la Abadesa, a town in the province of Valladolid, Castile and León
- Torrecilla de Alcañiz, a town in the province of Teruel, Aragon
- Torrecilla sobre Alesanco, a village in the province La Rioja
- Torrecilla de los Ángeles, a town in the province of Cáceres, Extremadura
- Torrecilla de la Jara, a town in the province of Toledo, Castile-La Mancha
- Torrecilla en Cameros, a village in the province La Rioja
- Torrecilla del Monte, a town in the province of Burgos, Castile and León
- Torrecilla de la Orden, a town in the province of Valladolid, Castile and León
- Torrecilla del Pinar, a town in the province of Segovia, Castile and León
- Torrecilla del Rebollar, a town in the province of Teruel, Aragon
- Torrecilla de la Torre, a town in the province of Valladolid, Castile and León
- Torrecillas de la Tiesa, a town in the province of Cáceres, Extremadura

== People ==
- Rubén Torrecilla (born 1979), a Spanish footballer
