= Illescas =

Illescas may refer to:

== Places ==
- Illescas, San Luis Potosí, Mexico
- Illescas Peninsula, Peru
- Cerro Illescas, Peru
- Illescas, Toledo, a municipality in the province of Toledo, Castile-La Mancha, Spain
- Illescas, Florida, village in Uruguay
- Illescas, Lavalleja, village in Uruguay

== People ==
- Fernando de Illescas (died 1419), Spanish Franciscan and diplomat
- Gonzalo de Illescas (bishop) (died 1464), Spanish monk and royal advisor
- Gonzalo de Illescas (historian) (1518–1583), Spanish historian
- Miguel Illescas (born 1965), Spanish chess Grandmaster

== Sports ==
- CB Illescas, Spanish professional basketball team
