= Nature Reserve Banks of Castronuño =

Reserva natural de las Riberas de Castronuño-Vega del Duero
- IUCN category III (natural monument or feature)
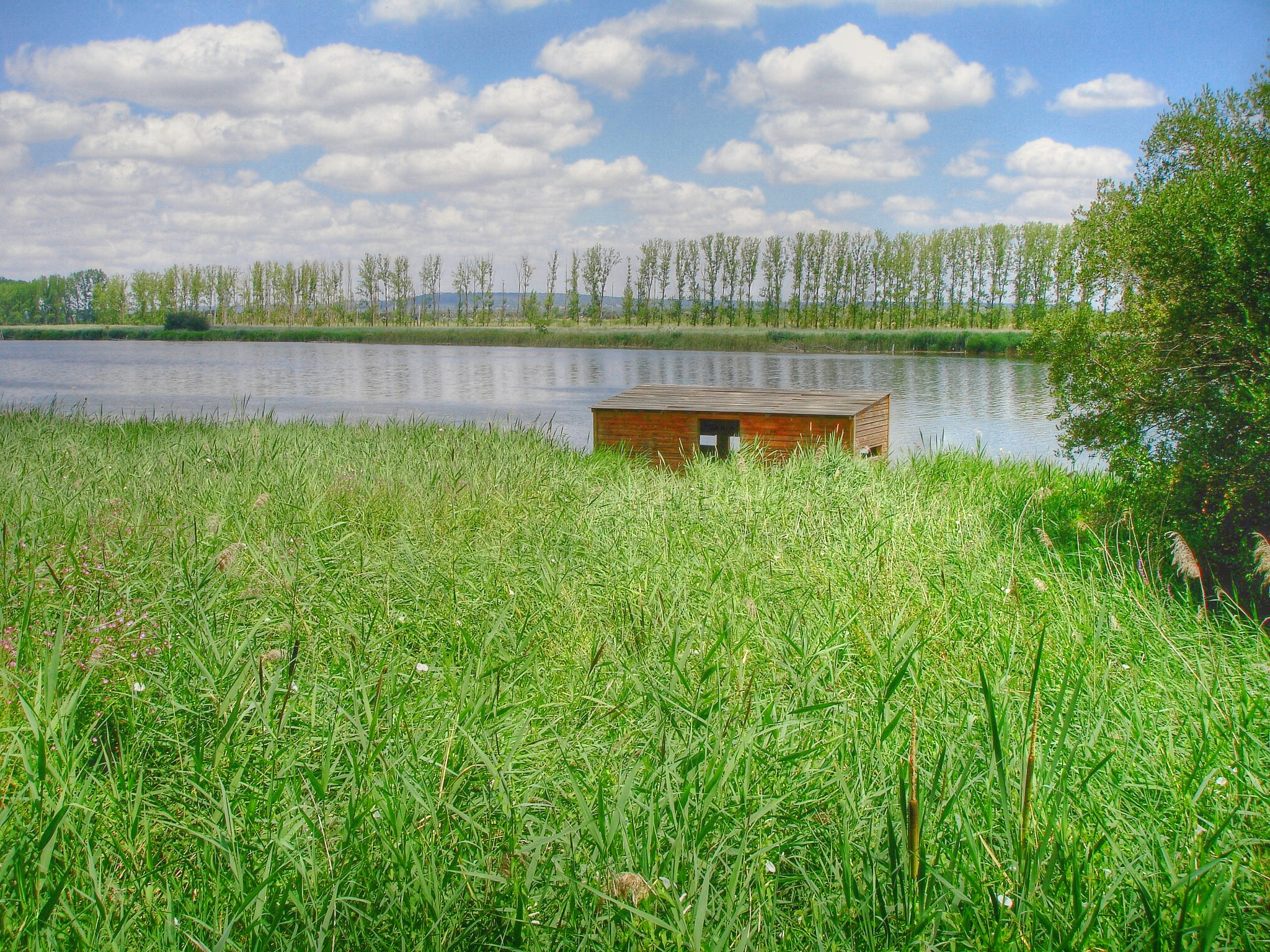
- Nature Reserve Banks of Castronuño

- The natural reserve on a map of Castile and Leon
- Location: Province of Valladolid, Castile and Leon, Spain
- Nearest city: Castronuño, Pollos, Torrecilla de la Abadesa and Tordesillas
- Coordinates: 41°23′36″N 5°16′1″W
- Area: 8.421 ha
- Established: 11 April 2002
- Governing body: Junta de Castilla y León (Government of Castile and León)
- Website: www.patrimonionatural.org/ren.php?espacio_id=31

The Natural Reserve on the banks of Castronuño-Vega del Duero is a nature reserve situated in the western part of the province of Valladolid, autonomous community of Castile and Leon, Spain. This is the only natural area protected in this province. Also it is known as the Gran Florida del Duero (the Great Florida of the Douro) .

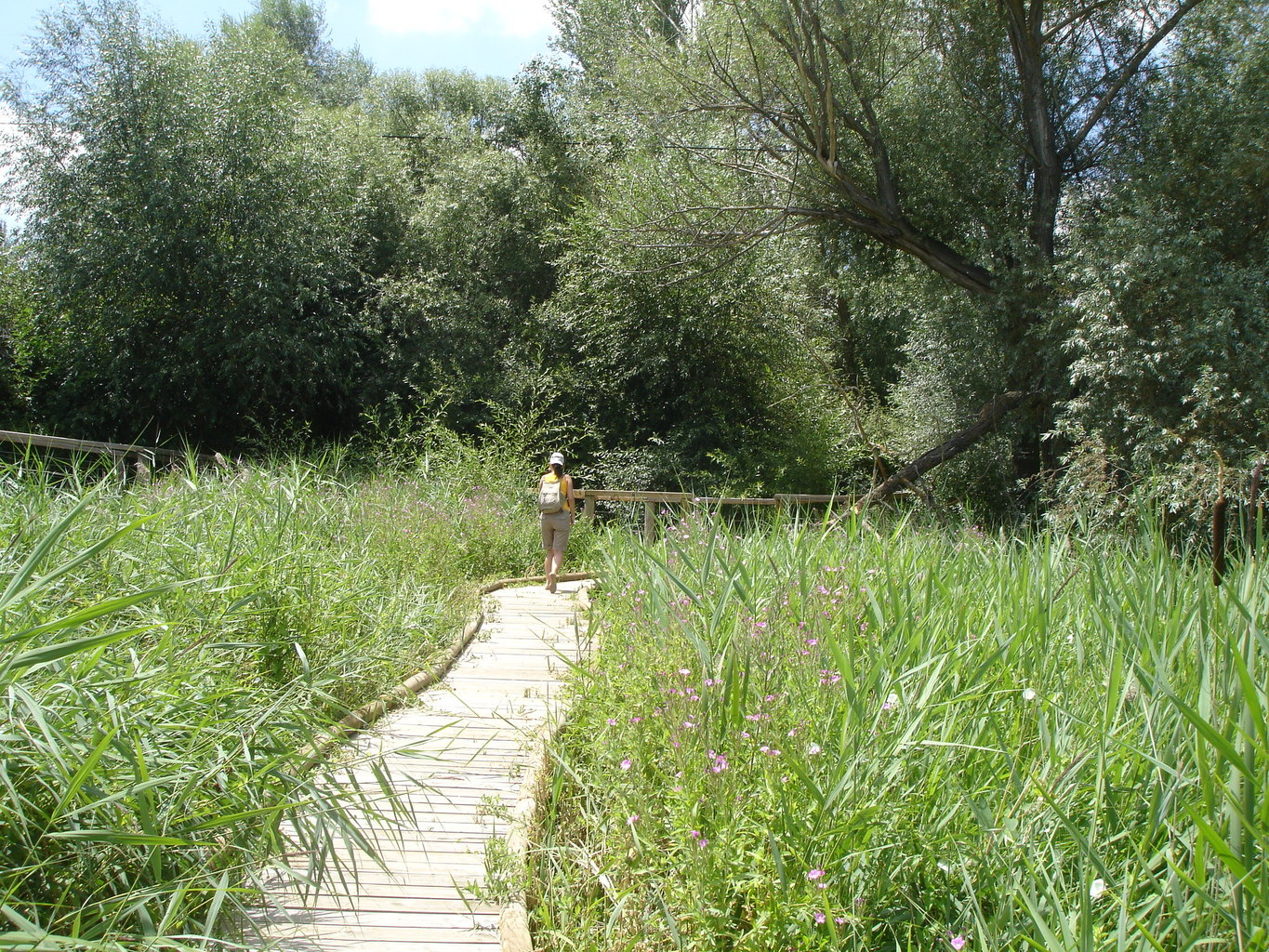
One of the paths of the reserve.

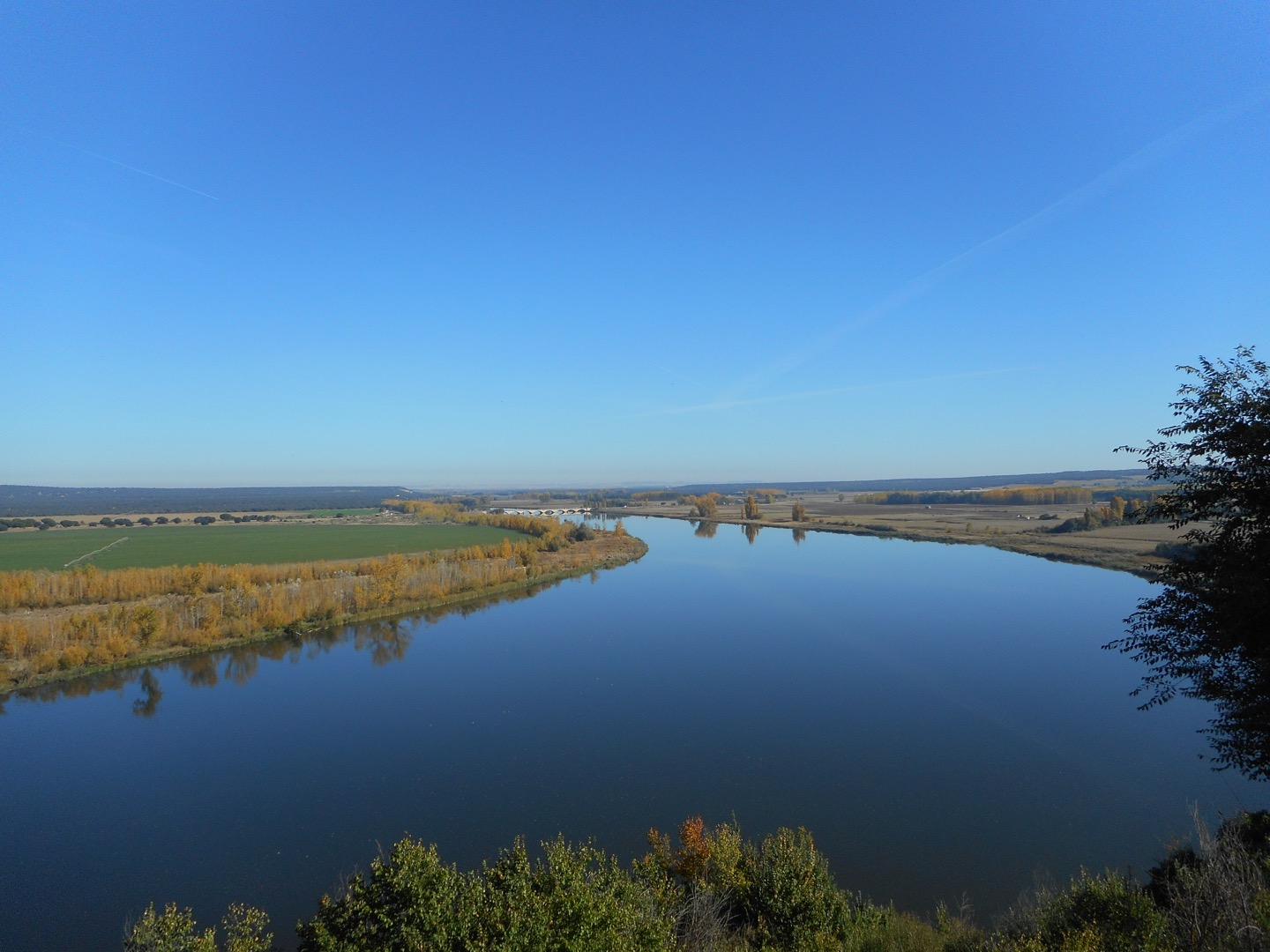
View from the viewpoint of the Muela towards the railway bridge.

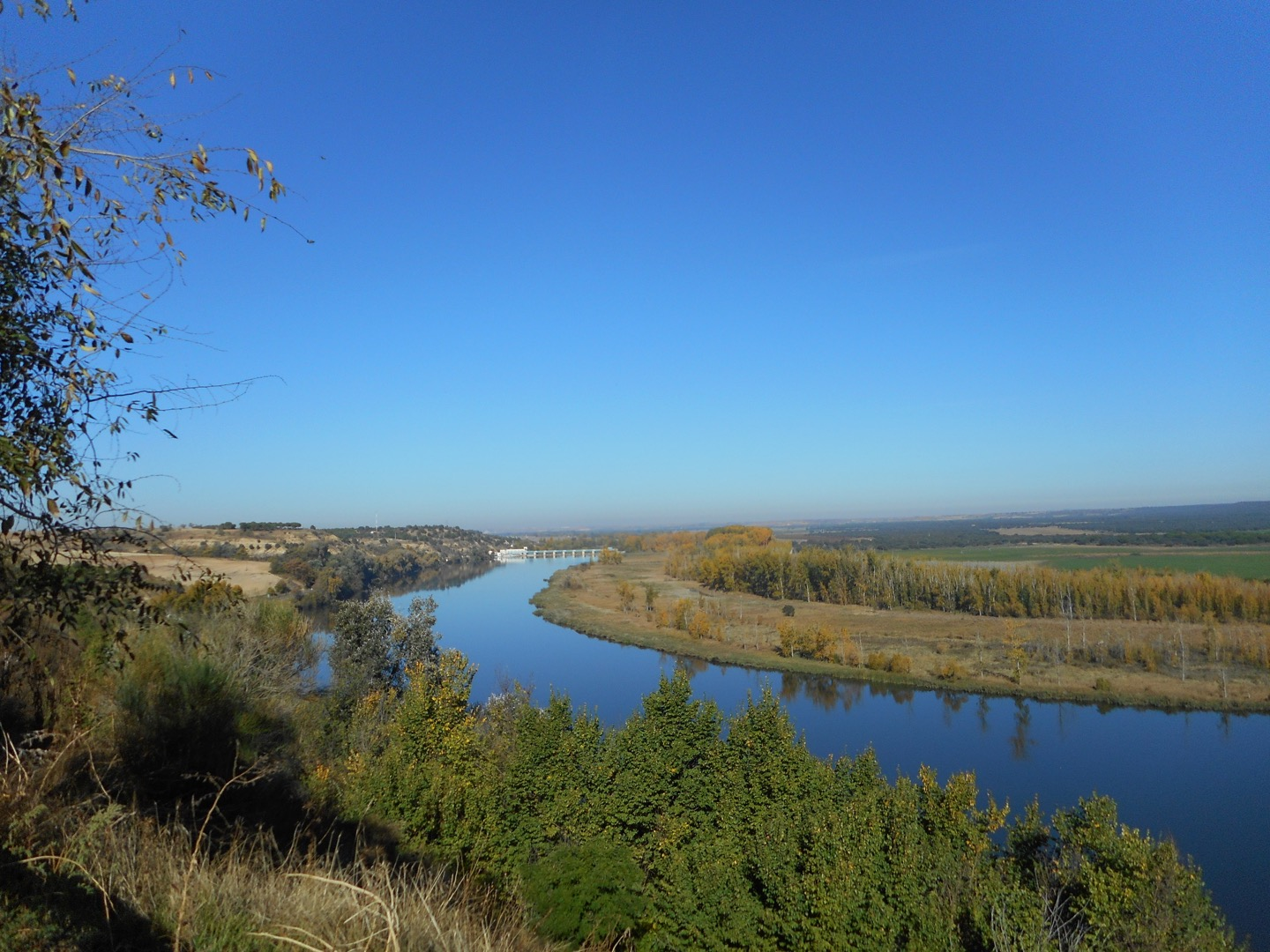
The river Douro, seen from the viewpoint of the Muela towards the dam.

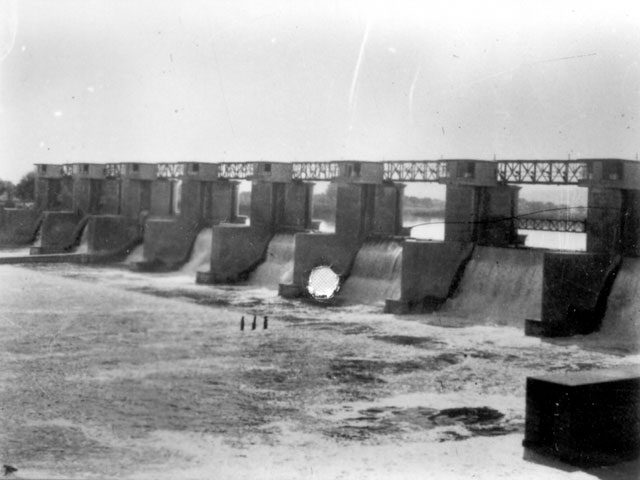
Dam of San José. The construction of this dam in the decade of the 40s, was what brought about the formation of this natural reserve.

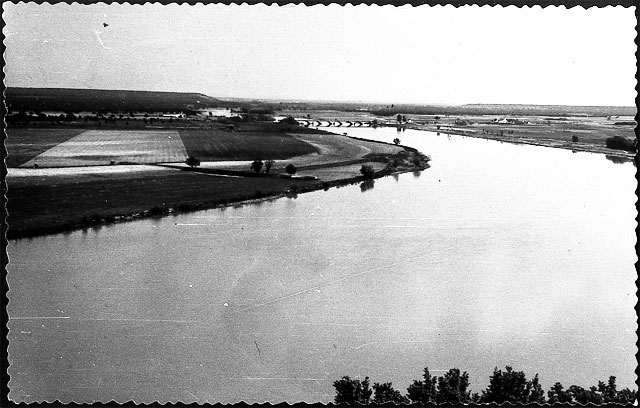
The Duero River to its step by Castronuño.

Is located in an area of moorland and sedimented banks. Therefore, this is an area of nesting and migratory water birds. The Duero is surrounded by forests of Ribera and constitutes a very interesting swamp ecosystem. It is an area of great plains and absence of high elevations

== History ==
In the 1940s a dam was constructed across the Douro River as part of a hydroelectric plant. Upstream, in the municipal district of Castronuño, was created the reservoir of San Jose, which was what brought about the formation of this reserve, which constitutes a unique ecosystem with biotic elements and landscape.

Many sediments were flooded and changed the riverbank to fertile fields, which were gradually colonized by large masses of the reedbed, maintained by the constant level of the reservoir. The greater growing mass of the reedbed attracted more birds attracted to the habitat of the wetlands. It is a semi-natural wetland.

The nature reserve was considered a Special Protection Area for Birds in 1992 and Strict Nature Reserve in 2002.
