= Rosa Montero =

Spanish journalist and author (born 1951)

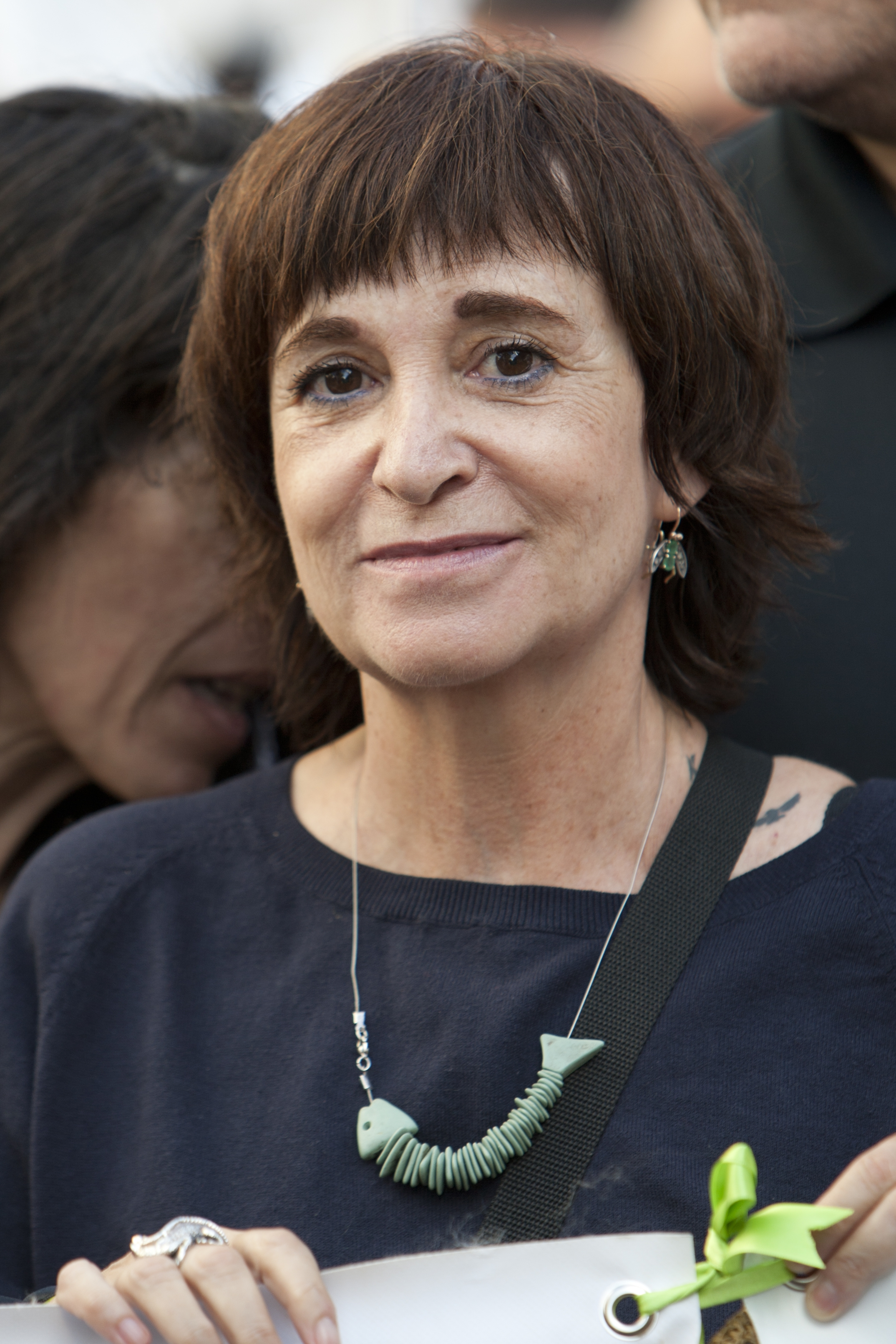
Rosa Montero at a demonstration against the Toro de la Vega tournament 2014

Rosa Montero Gayo (Spanish pronunciation: [ˈrosa monˈteɾo ˈɣaʝo]; born 3 January 1951) is a Spanish journalist and author of contemporary fiction.

== Early life and education ==
The daughter of a bullfighter and a housewife, Montero was born in Cuatro Caminos, a district of Madrid. The contraction of tuberculosis forced her to remain at home between the ages of five and nine, and she began reading and writing extensively during that time. She then entered the Beatriz Galindo Institute of Madrid, and at 17, she began her university studies in Madrid University's School of Philosophy and Arts (Facultad de Filosofía y Letras). The following year, she was admitted into the School of Journalism. During her university years, she participated in independent theatre groups.

== Writing career ==
After school, she began working as a journalist, and in 1976, she began working at El País. In 1977, she began publishing interviews in the Sunday edition of the paper, and the following year, she won the "Manuel del Arco" prize for her work and was the first woman to receive it. She also published her first novel in 1979, Crónica del desamor (Chronicle of Enmity). In 1980, she won the National Journalism Prize for her articles and literary reports, and that year, she was named editor-in-chief of El País Semanal.

In 1981 she published La función Delta (The Delta Function), and the following year, a collection of her interviews previously published in El País was released, with the title "Cinco años de país" (Five Years of El País). The novel Te trataré como una reina (I Will Treat You Like a Queen) followed in 1983 and was a commercial success. She was awarded the World Prize for interviews in 1987 and published Temblor (Tremor) in 1990.

Her first children's story, El nido de los sueños (The Nest of Dreams), was published in 1992, and in the following years, she released Bella y Oscura (Beautiful and Dark, 1993) and La Vida desnuda (The Naked Life, 1994). In 1994 she was awarded the Journalism Prize, and in 1997 she received the Spring Novel Prize for her work La hija del caníbal (The Cannibal's Daughter). In 1999, she published Pasiones (Passions), and in 2002, Estampas bostonianas y otros viajes. In 2003, she published what she considers one of her best works, La Loca de la Casa (The Lunatic of the House). This book won the Qué Leer Prize for the best book published in Spain in 2003, and the Grinzane Cavour Prize for the best foreign book published in Italy in 2004. In 2005 she published Historia del Rey Transparente (Story of the Transparent King), which also won the Qué Leer Prize as the best book published in Spain in 2005.

Her short story El Abuelo (The Grandfather) was included in Rainy Days - Días de lluvia: Short Stories by Contemporary Spanish Women Writers, an anthology edited by Montserrat Lunati, together with a translation into English.

== Selected works ==
Note regarding translations (Note: Note that English language editions of Montero's work may not be currently available, and the title translations provided in the Selected Works section may well not correspond to titles eventually used in the English edition of these books.)

- España para ti... para siempre (1976) A.Q. Ediciones, Madrid ISBN 978-8-47388-030-5 (Spain for you... forever)
- Crónica del desamor (1979) Editorial Debate, Madrid ISBN 978-8-47444-023-2 (Chronicle of heartbreak)
- La función Delta (1981) Editorial Debate, Madrid ISBN 978-8-47444-037-9 (The Delta function)
- Cinco años de país (1982) Editorial Debate, Madrid ISBN 978-8-47444-065-2 (Five years of a country)
- Te trataré como a una reina (1983) Seix Barral, Barcelona ISBN 978-8-43220-819-5 (I will treat you like a queen)
- Media Naranja (1985) with Jesus Yagüe, Twelve episode television series (Better half)
- Amado Amo (1988) Editorial Debate, Madrid ISBN 978-8-47444-297-7 (Beloved master)
- Temblor (1990) (Trembling)
- El nido de los sueños (1991) (The dreams nest)
- Bella y oscura (1993) (Beautiful and dark)
- La vida desnuda (1994) (The naked life)
- Historias de Mujeres (1995) (Stories of women)
- Entrevistas (1996) (Interviews)
- La hija del caníbal (1997) (The daughter of the cannibal)
- Amantes y enemigos. Historias de parejas (1998) (Lovers and enemies. Tales of couples)
- El viaje fantástico de Bárbara (1998) (Barbara's fantastic journey)
- Las barbaridades de Bárbara (1998) (Barbara's barbarities)
- Bárbara contra el doctor Colmillos (1998) (Barbara against Doctor Fangs)
- Pasiones (1999) (Passions)
- El corazón del Tártaro (2001) (The heart of the Tartarus)
- La loca de la casa (2003) (The crazy woman of the house)
- Historia del rey transparente (2005) (The story of the transparent king)
- Instrucciones para salvar al mundo (2008) (Instructions to save the world)
- Lágrimas en la lluvia (2011) (Bruna Husky 1) (Tears in the rain)
- La ridícula idea de no volver a verte (2013) (The ridiculous idea of never seeing you again)
- El peso del corazón (2015) (Bruna Husky 2) (The weight of the heart)
- La carne (2016) (The flesh)
- Los tiempos del odio (2018) (Bruna Husky 3) (The times of hate)
- La buena suerte (2020) (The good luck)
