= Royal Palace of Tordesillas =

Former royal palace in Spain

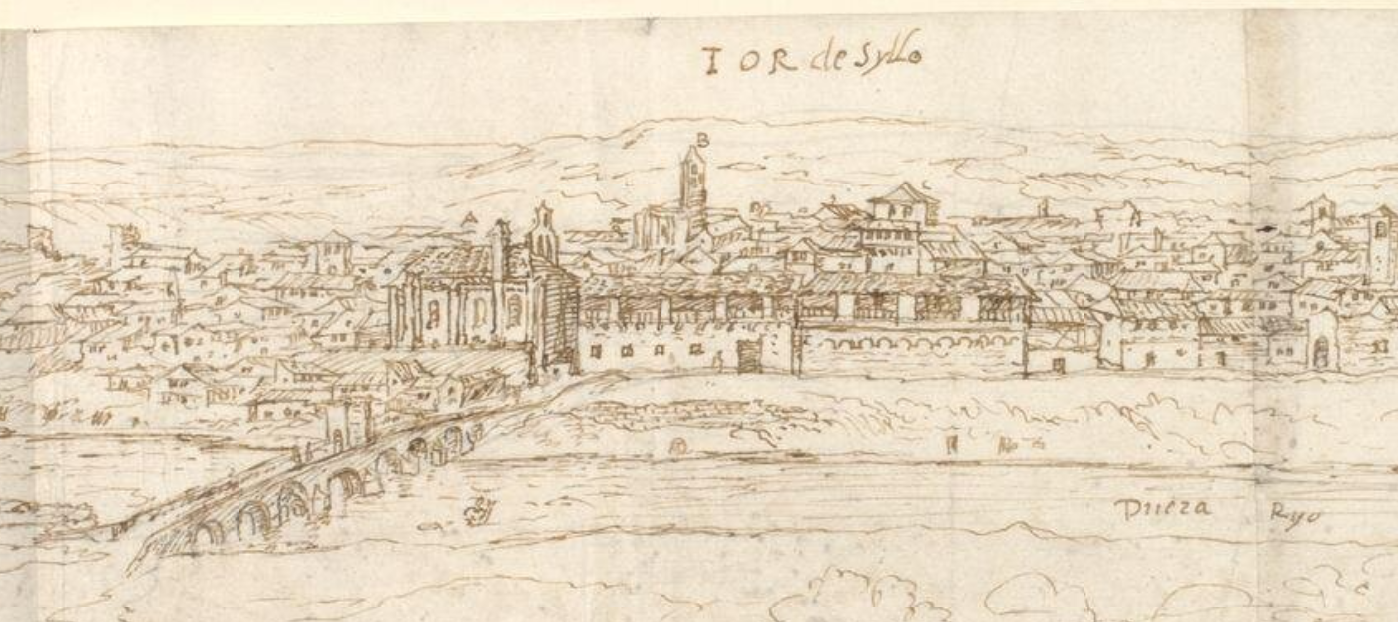
Royal Palace of Tordesillas (right next to the church and the bridge) on a panoramic view by Anton van den Wyngaerde (around 1565)

The Palace of Tordesillas (Spanish: Palacio Real de Tordesillas) is a former royal residence in Tordesillas, Spain. It was here that queen Joanna of Castile, while nominally reigning, after being declared insane, was confined in 1506 until her death in 1555. The palace was demolished in the 18th century.

== History ==
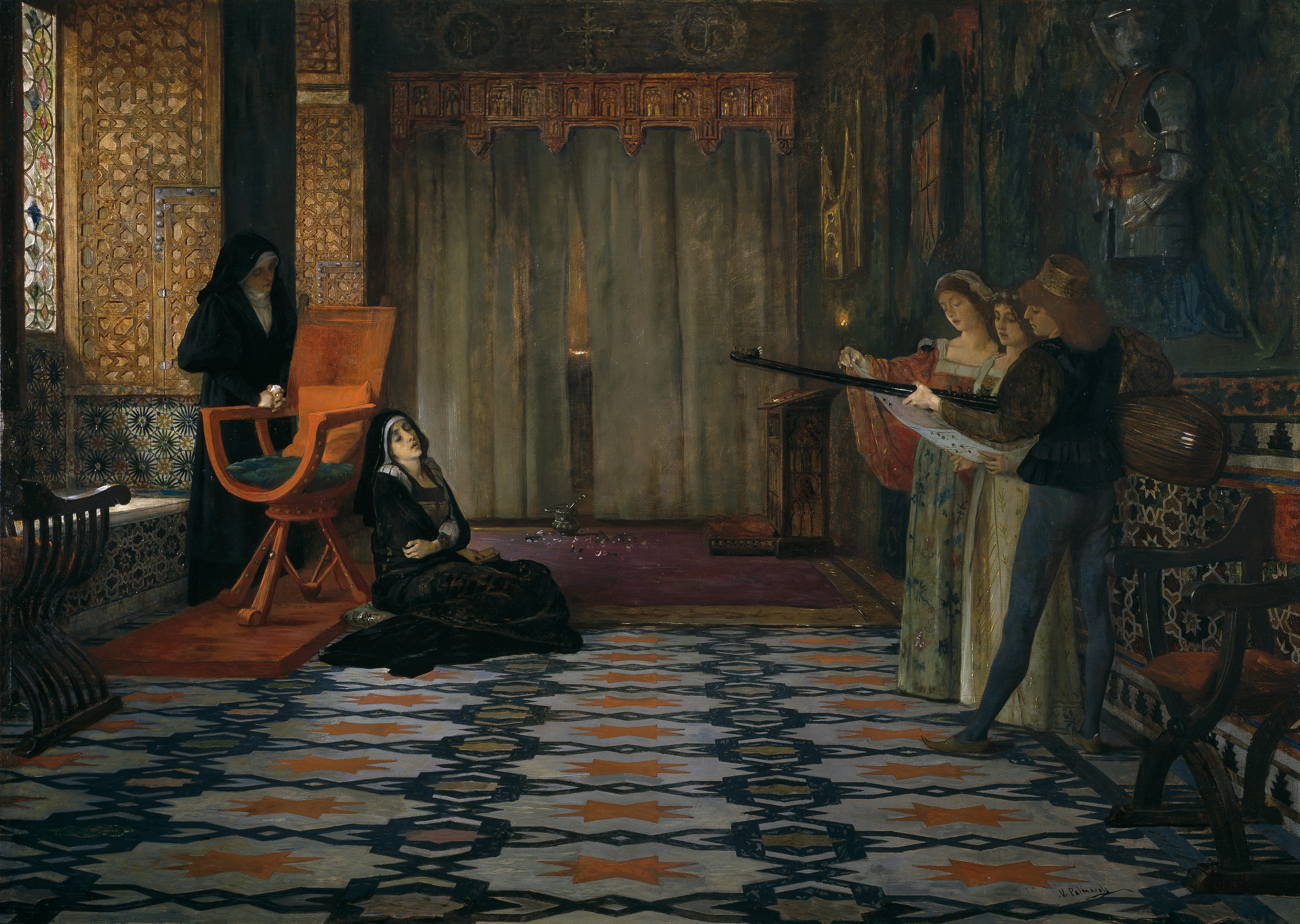
Queen Joanna of Castile confined at the palace of Tordesillas

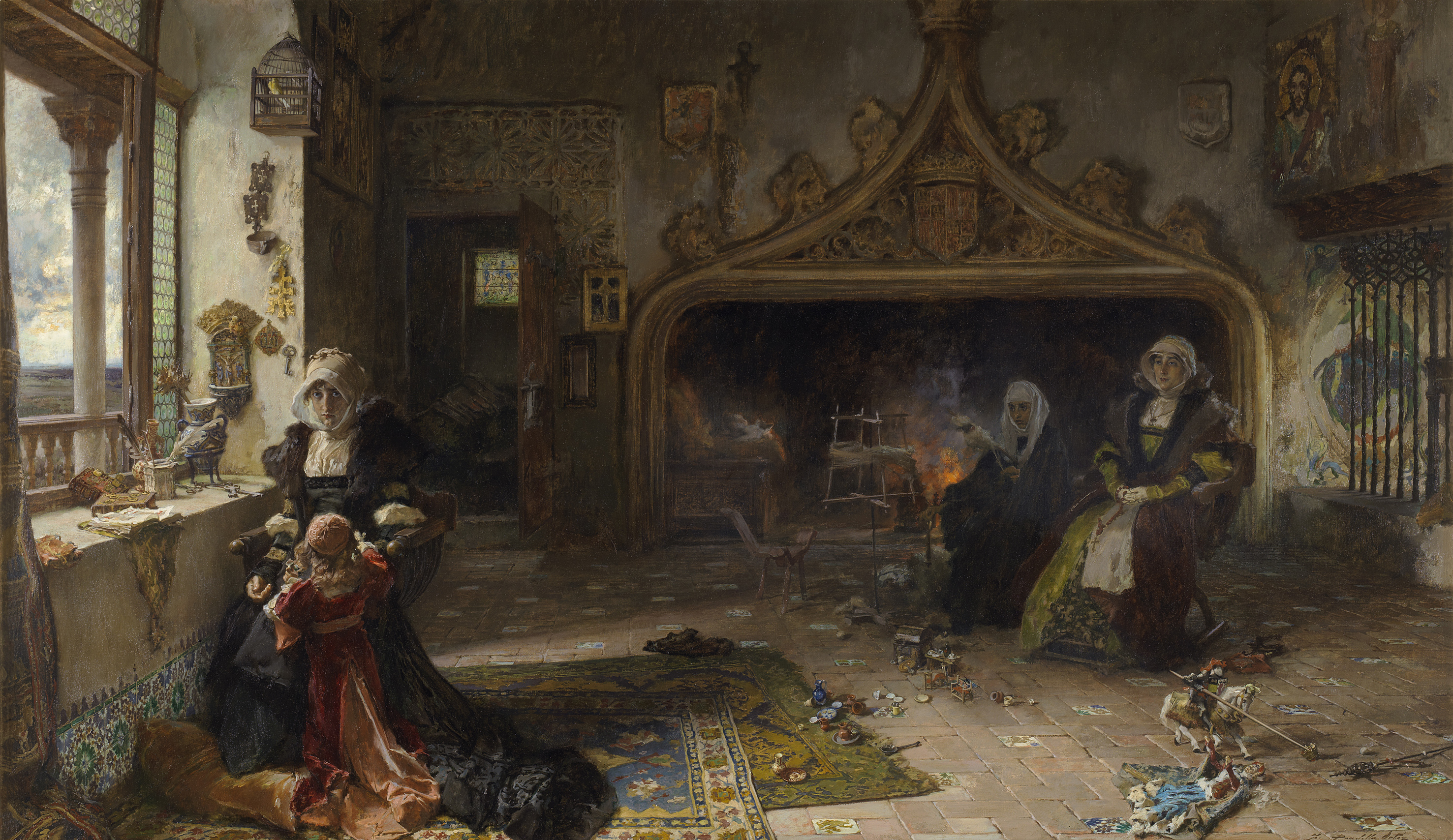
Another painting depicting Queen Joanna of Castile confined at the palace of Tordesillas

One of the most important buildings in Tordesillas was its Royal Palace, the temporary seat of the itinerant courts of the Castilian monarchies and especially notable for being the place where Queen Joanna I of Castile stayed for 46 years, after being declared insane in 1506.

After the palace of Alfonso XI and Pedro I was converted into a convent of Poor Clares, the Royal Convent of Santa Clara, King Henry III decided to build another palace near the previous one, overlooking the Douro river.

Its perimeter was rectangular, it was built with masonry and adobe and had two floors of height. It had three gates: the main one, to the south facing the river; another to the west, on San Antolín Street and the third to the north, in front of the Alderete palace. It also had an exterior corridor that ran along the south façade and more than half of the west façade, continuing as an elevated passageway over the street to communicate with the church of San Antolín.

In the center of the south façade there was a square tower with three levels and a corridor in the last one, which was used for surveillance. The rooms were covered with wooden coffered ceilings and their walls with rich tapestries. They were arranged around two patios and an orchard to the east.

The royal palace underwent renovations to accommodate Queen Juana and her entourage. Until 1524, she was accompanied by her daughter, Catherine, who left Tordesillas when she married John III of Portugal.

Due to the poor quality of the construction materials, it needed continuous repairs. After the death of Queen Joanna, the building was abandoned and, despite carrying out repairs to prevent its state of ruin, it was demolished in 1773 during the reign of Charles III. New buildings were constructed on the palace site and the urban landscape changed completely.

For an exhibition on the palace in Tordesillas in 2017, a replica of the palace has been made at a scale of 1:40. This model can be seen in the Treaty House museum in Tordesillas.

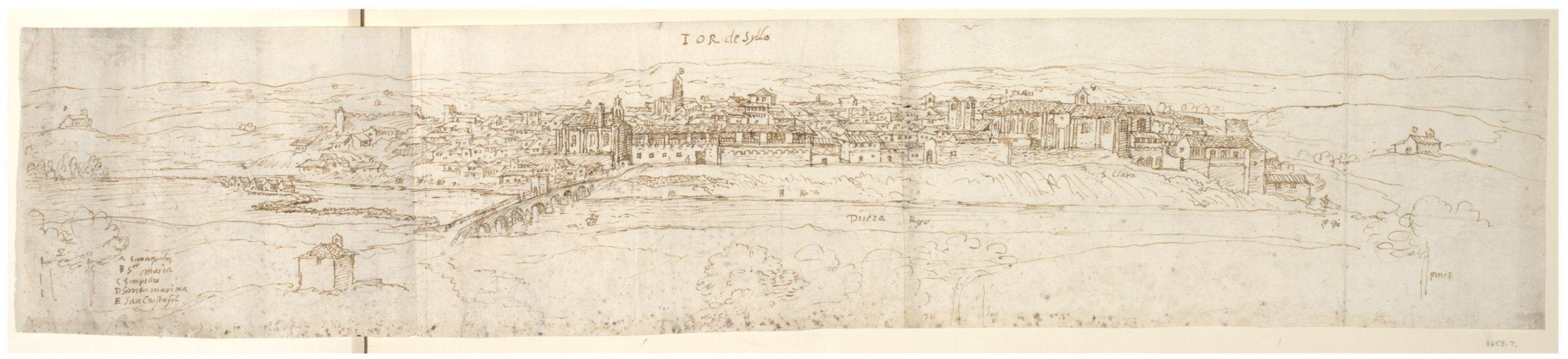
Panoramic view of Tordesillas with the palace in the middle by Anton van den Wyngaerde

== Literature ==
- Zalama, Miguel Ángel (2000). Vida cotidiana y arte en el palacio de la Reina Juana I en Tordesillas (in Spanish). Valladolid: Universidad de Valladolid.
- Zalama, Miguel Ángel (2010). Juana I: arte, poder y cultura en torno a una reina que no gobernó (in Spanish). Madrid: Centro de Estudios Europa Hispánica. p. 388. ISBN 978-84-936776-2-6.
