= Castronuño =

Coordinates: 41°23′N 5°16′W

Castronuño, Spain
- Coat of arms

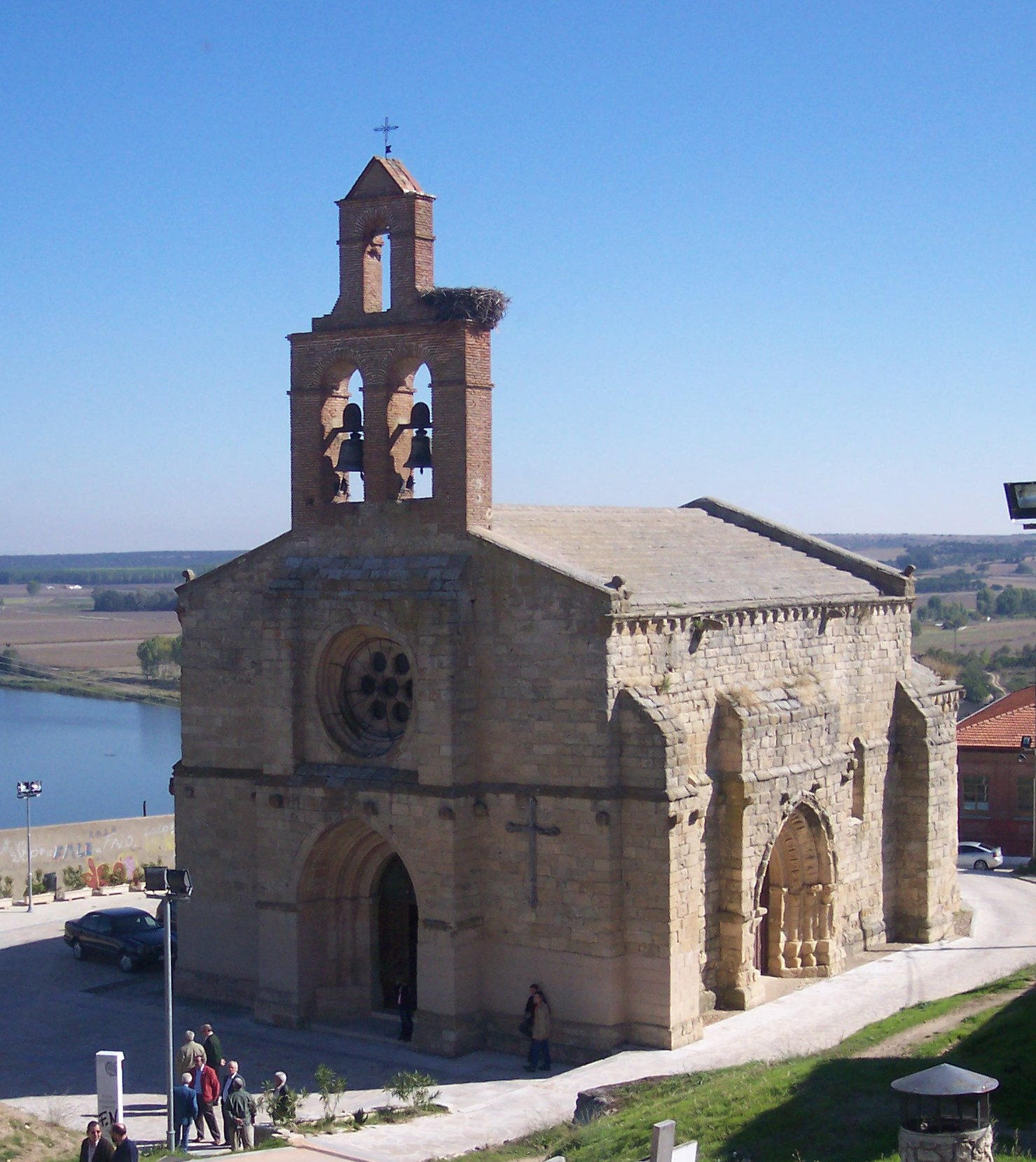
- Church of Santa María
- Country: Spain
- Autonomous community: Castile and León
- Province: Valladolid
- Municipality: Castronuño

Area
  - Total: 124 km^{2} (48 sq mi)

Population (2025-01-01)
  - Total: 737
  - Density: 5.94/km^{2} (15.4/sq mi)
- Time zone: UTC+1 (CET)
  - Summer (DST): UTC+2 (CEST)

Castronuño is a municipality located in the province of Valladolid, Castile and León, Spain. According to the 2004 census (INE), the municipality has a population of 1,049 inhabitants.

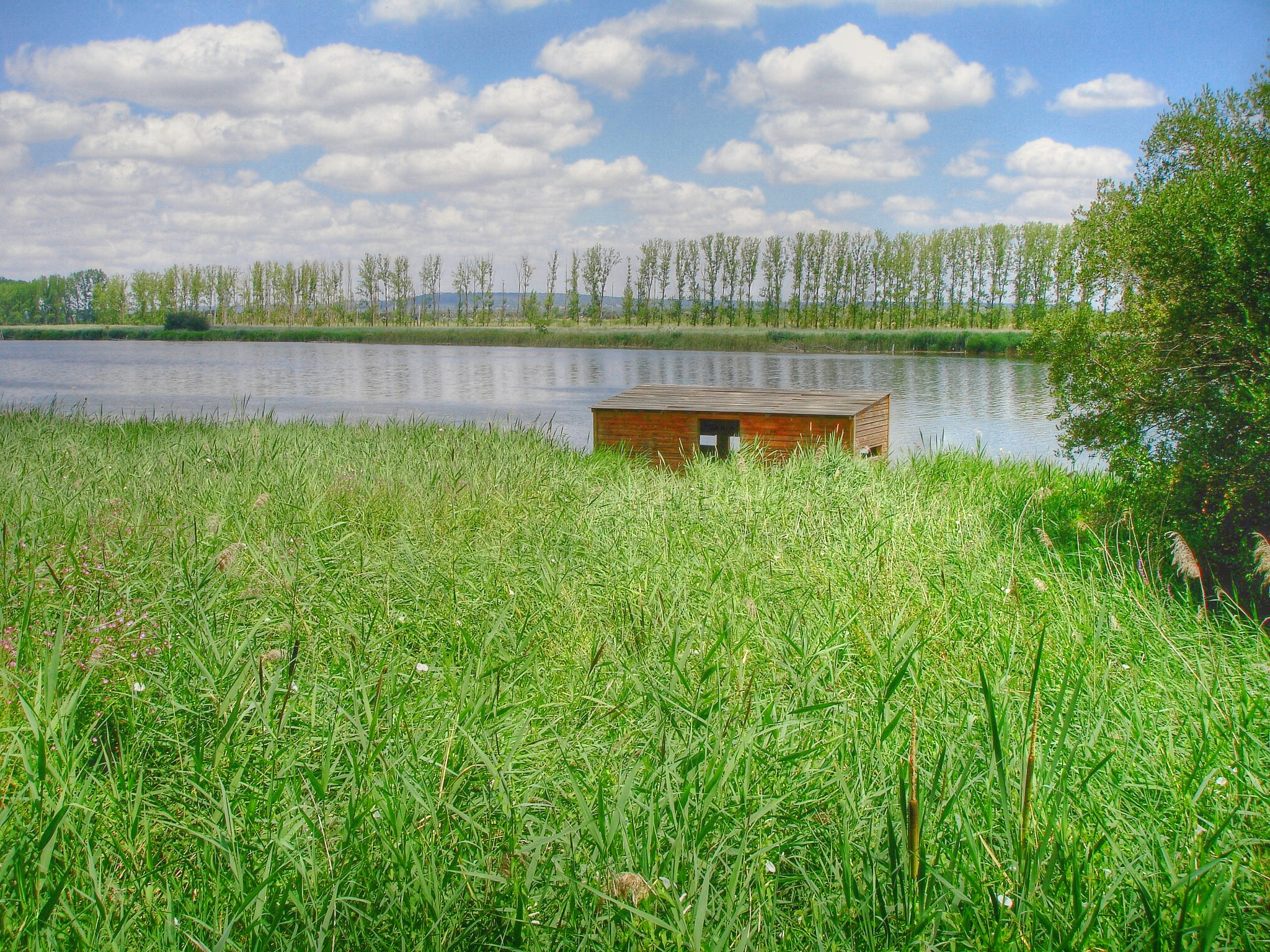
Nature Reserve Banks of Castronuño.

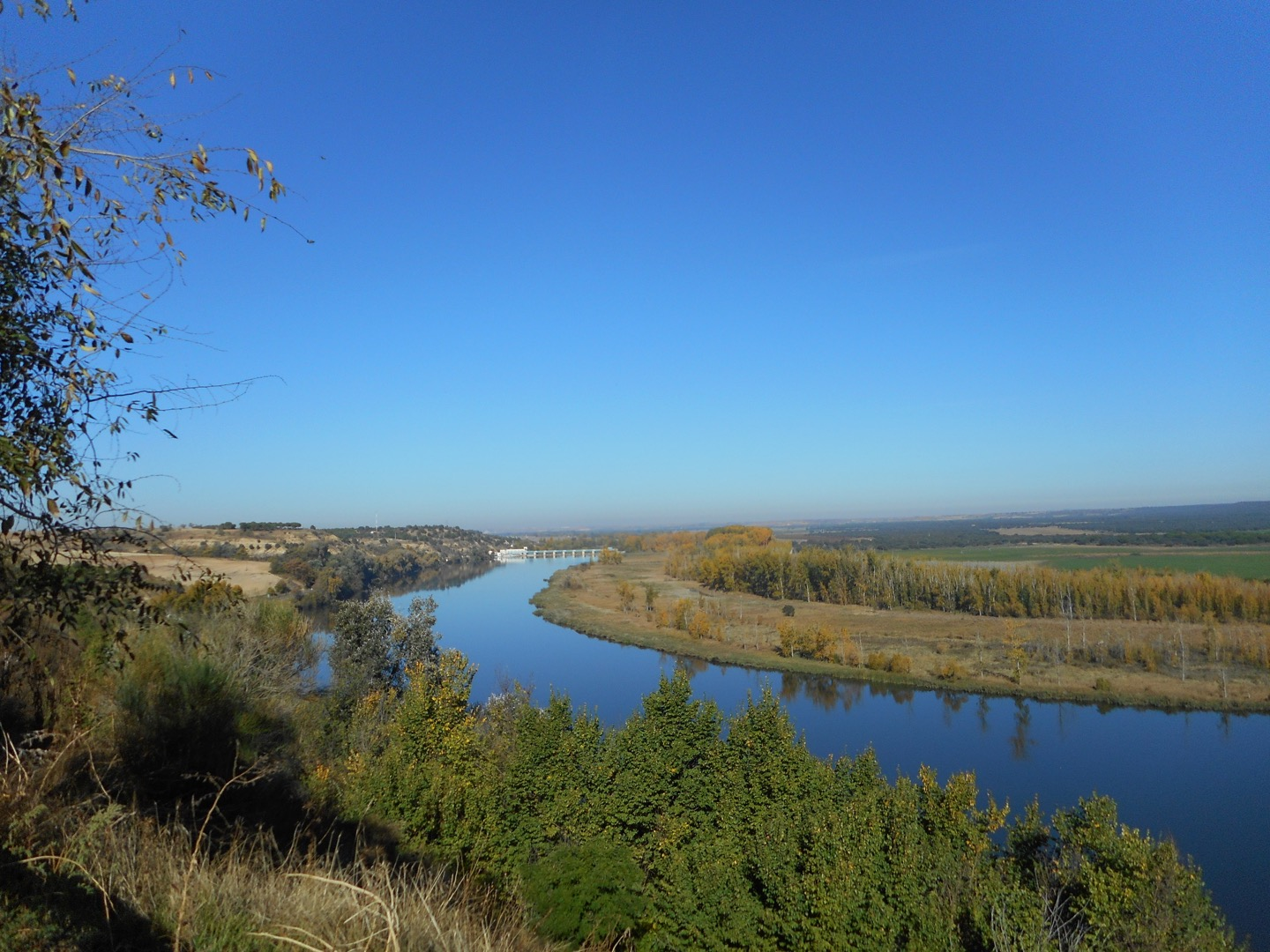
The river Douro, seen from the viewpoint of the Muela towards the dam.

== See also ==
- Cuisine of the province of Valladolid
