= Torrecilla sobre Alesanco =

- Municipality
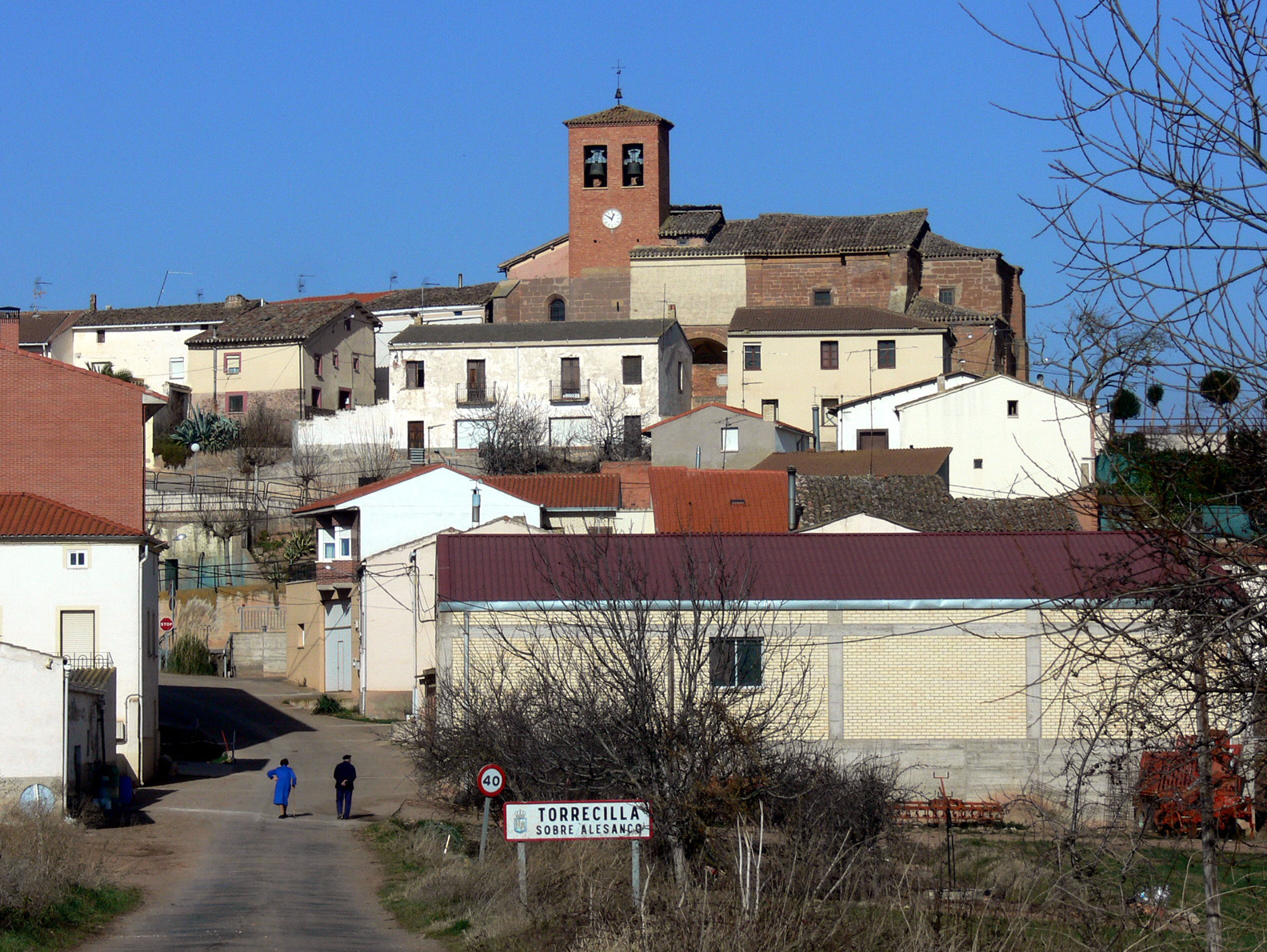
- View of Torrecilla sobre Alesanco

- Location within La Rioja, Spain Location within Spain
- Coordinates: 42°24′29″N 2°50′04″W
- Country: Spain
- Autonomous community: La Rioja
- Comarca: Nájera

Government
  - Mayor: Cirilo Ángel Amutio Bolandier (PP)

Area
  - Total: 4.36 km^{2} (1.68 sq mi)
- Elevation: 612 m (2,008 ft)

Population (2025-01-01)
  - Total: 58
- Postal code: 26224
- Website: Official website

Location of Torrecilla sobre Alesanco in the municipality map of La Rioja

Torrecilla sobre Alesanco is a village in the province and autonomous community of La Rioja, Spain. The municipality covers an area of 4.36 square kilometres (1.68 sq mi) and as of 2011 had a population of 38 people.

== Geography ==
=== Position ===
It has a privileged situation for having a 617 metres official average altitude, between Nájera and Santo Domingo de la Calzada. Actually, it is 12 km far from each other. Nearby there are different villages, such as San Millán de la Cogolla (15 km), Cañas (2 km) and Logroño, the capital city of La Rioja (37 km).

It is placed in the medium course of the Tuerto river.

== History ==
The first documentary mention of the village appears in the regional code of laws of Nájera, admitted by Sancho III of Pamplona around the year 1020 and verified by Alfonso VI of León and Castile in 1076.

In the 12th century, Mrs. Toda Petriz, who was Mr. Pedro López de Haro’s widow, quoted Torrecilla in a donation writing.

In 1215, Mrs. Toda relinquished the locality to Santa María la Real of Nájera monastery, in assistance for her soul.

== Landmarks ==
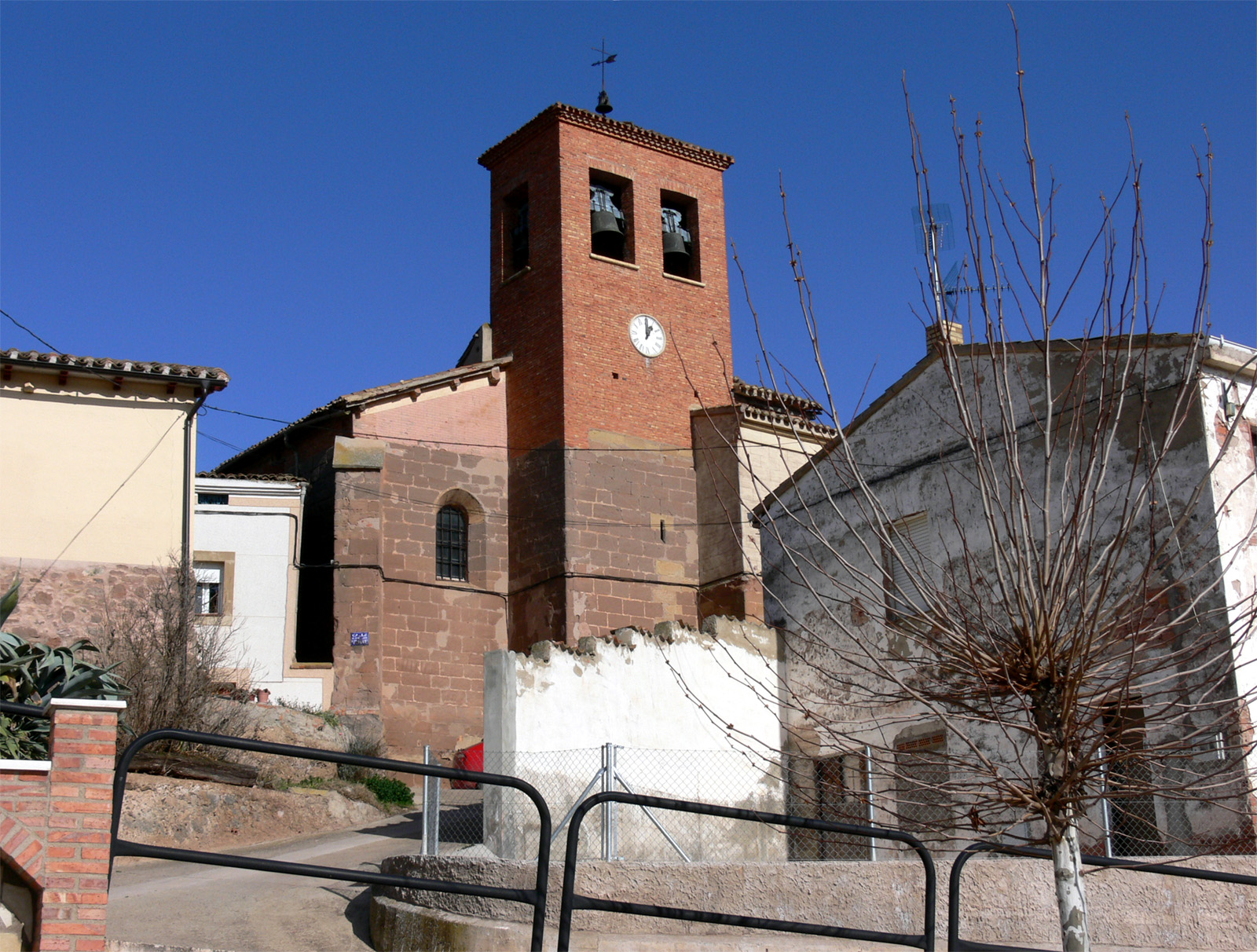
Asunción church

The parochial church of Asunción was built in the 16th and 17th centuries. It is an ashlar work with recent added bricks. It consists of a nave with an arched form used to provide a space with a ceiling or roof and two side chapels. Lately, the upper part of the tower has been reconstructed with bricks.

The chancel, the space around the altar, including the choir and the sanctuary, is an altarpiece with:

- Pew:In the sanctum pew, a prie-dieu image of Saint Isidore of Seville and the sculpture of Our Lady of the Pillar are placed.
- Attic: In the attic, a sculpture of Jesus Christ in the cross can be seen.
- Three aisles

In the two side chapels, there are two sculptures one of Assumption of Mary and the other of the Descent from the Cross

In the nave, two altarpieces more are shown: the first one in honour of Valvanera Virgin, while the second one was dedicated to the Immaculate Conception.

== Landscape ==
According to the landscape topology, the wood has been repopulated with pine trees, although it still preserves some oaks. Among the wide diversity, the most plentiful animals in this area are: the medium-size predatory animals, foxes, rabbits and partridge birds.

== Economy ==
The economy in this village is mainly agricultural based on cultivations of potatoes, beetroots, wheat and barley. However, a quarter of the total worked area is destined to vineyards.

The cattle herd (including bovine and porcine) which Pascual Madoz described in his "Geographic, Statistical and historical dictionary of La Rioja" a century ago has been currently reduced to two pig farms.

== Local festivities ==
- 15 August in honour of Our Assumption of the Virgin Mary into Heaven
- Thanks offering, 3rd Saturday with traditional dances
- Corpus Christi’s Eve, religious pilgrimage to the Valvanera monastery, commemorating the disappearance of a disease that devastated the village in 1523. Until recently, the romeria has been celebrated on 25 March. They move in carriages and pick up stones from the Sanctuary which when thrown to the air, protect their fields from storms.
- On 14 May, eve of Isidore the Farm Labourer, Isidore of Seville is celebrated. On 15 May both saints travers in procession through the fields.

== Politics ==
List of mayors since the democratic elections of 1979
Term	Mayor	Political party
1979–1983	José Luis Martínez Martínez	UCD
1983–1987	Luis Andrés Cañas Martínez	AP
1987–1991	Luis Andrés Cañas Martínez	AP
1991–1995	José Luis Martínez Martínez	PP
1995–1999	José Miguel Olarte Santamaría	PP
1999–2003	Luis Andrés Cañas Martínez	PP
2003–2007	Cirilo Ángel Amutio Bolandier	PP
2007–2011	Cirilo Ángel Amutio Bolandier	PP
2011–2015	Cirilo Ángel Amutio Bolandier	PP
2015–2019	Cirilo Ángel Amutio Bolandier	PP
2019–2023	Braulio Amutio Sobrevilla	PSOE
2023–	n/d	n/d
