= Tordesillas =

- Municipality
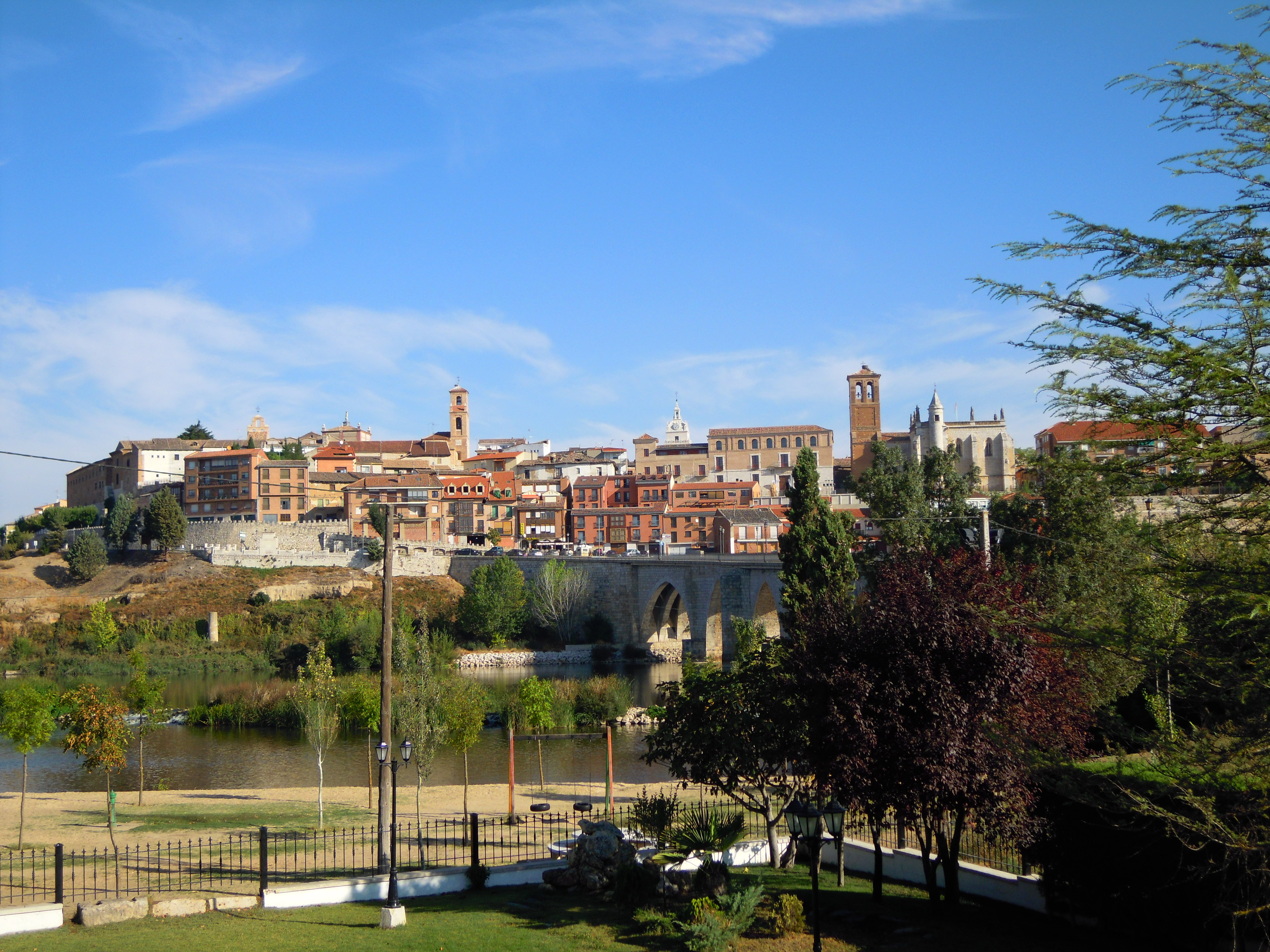
- Southern Tordesillas in September 2012.

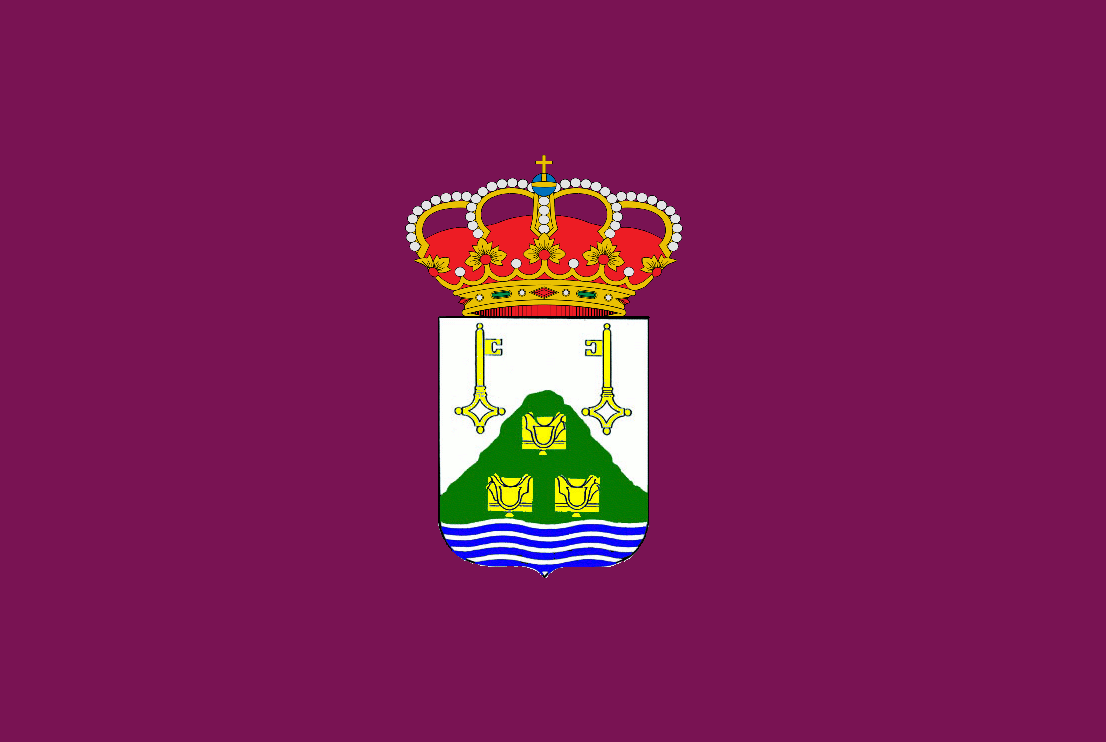
- Flag Coat of arms

- Location in Spain Tordesillas (Spain)
- Coordinates: 41°30′N 5°00′W
- Country: Spain
- Autonomous community: Castile and León
- Province: Valladolid
- Comarca: Tierra del Vino

Government
  - Mayor: María del Milagro Zarzuelo Capellán (PP)

Area
  - Total: 141.95 km^{2} (54.81 sq mi)
- Elevation: 704 m (2,310 ft)

Population (2025-01-01)
  - Total: 8,773
  - Density: 61.80/km^{2} (160.1/sq mi)
- Demonym: Tordesillanos
- Time zone: UTC+1 (CET)
  - Summer (DST): UTC+2 (CEST)
- Postal code: 47100
- Website: Official website

Tordesillas (Spanish pronunciation: [toɾðeˈsiʎas]) is a town and municipality in the province of Valladolid, Castile and León, central Spain. It is located 25 kilometres (16 mi) southwest of the provincial capital, Valladolid at an elevation of 704 m (2,310 ft). The population was c. 8,760 as of 2021.

The town is located on the Douro River although the river is not navigable at that point. Highways connect to Madrid (182 km (113 mi) southeast) and Salamanca (96 km (60 mi) southwest). The provincial capital Valladolid is also linked by four-lane highway. Because of its important highway connections Tordesillas has become a major transit hub. The economy is based on services—especially connected to tourism—and the agricultural production of the surrounding area. Wheat has long been the traditional agricultural product (see Cuisine of the province of Valladolid).

The town has many hotels with a Parador, four three-star hotels, one two-star hotel, and ten hostels and pensions. A camping site is nearby. Over 25 restaurants includes the three-star Parador restaurant. North of the town there is a fertile valley formed by the Douro, with extensive use of irrigation by central pivots.

Tordesillas is known for its Toro de la Vega festival during which a bull was slaughtered by people on horseback and on foot. Animal rights groups repeatedly tried to stop this traditional killing, and the practice was discontinued in 2016.

== History ==
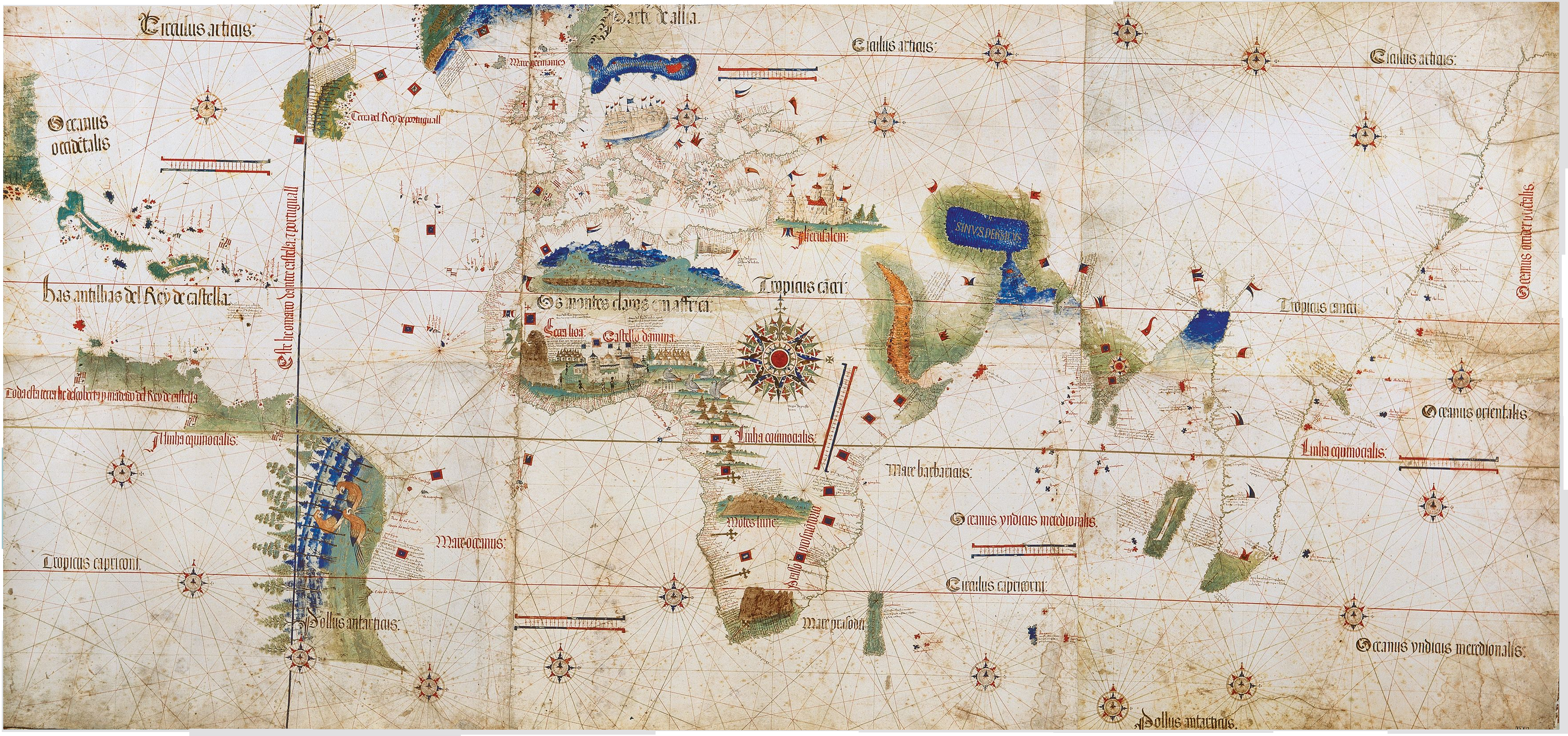
The Cantino planisphere (1502), depicting the meridian of Tordesillas.

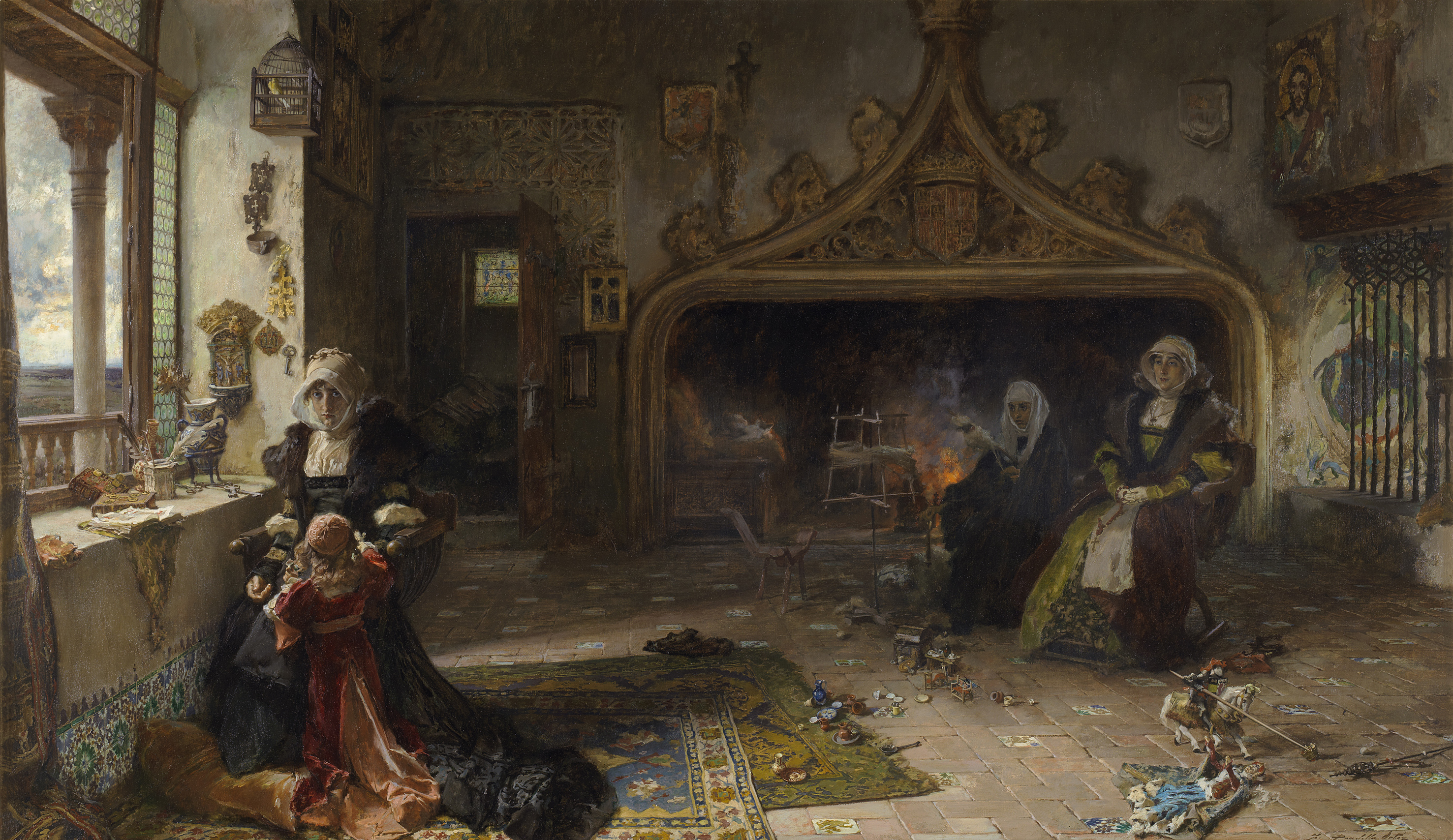
Juana the Mad imprisoned in Tordesillas with her daughter, the infanta Catalina by Francisco Pradilla Ortiz (Museo del Prado, 1906)

The Roman Turris Sillae, built on the hill of Siellas, was the bulwark of the defensive line of the Duero during the Reconquest. In 1262 it received its charter from Alfonso X the Wise. The town began to be favored by the royal family and nobility, above all after Alfonso XI built a palace (1325). In the 15th century the town hosted several meetings of the Cortes. During the skirmishes between Henry IV and the nobility the city supported the monarchy, and again during the clashes between the Catholic Monarchs and Joanna la Beltraneja in 1476.

The Catholic Monarchs signed the Treaty of Tordesillas with the Portuguese crown in 1494, which established the line dividing the globe between Spain and Portugal for colonization purposes. This affected the Portuguese and Spanish colonization of the Americas.

Despite Tordesillas' traditional support for the monarchy, in the Castilian War of the Communities by citizens of Castile against the rule of Charles V, the city took the side of the Comuneros. The leaders chose Charles' own mother, Queen Joanna I, as an alternative ruler in more than title in 1519. They came to the town to ask for the mediation of Joanna I, confined within the Santa Clara convent since 1509 by her father Ferdinand II. However, in 1521, after nearly a year of rebellion, the reorganized supporters of the emperor Charles V struck a crippling blow to the comuneros at the Battle of Villalar, and finally royal troops of the Count of Haro captured Tordesillas.

This 16th-century event was the beginning of a long decline from influence and prosperity. The ongoing position of Tordesillas at a crossing of historic roads and modern highways has been the decisive factor in its economic survival and development.

== Main sights ==
=== Convent of Santa Clara ===
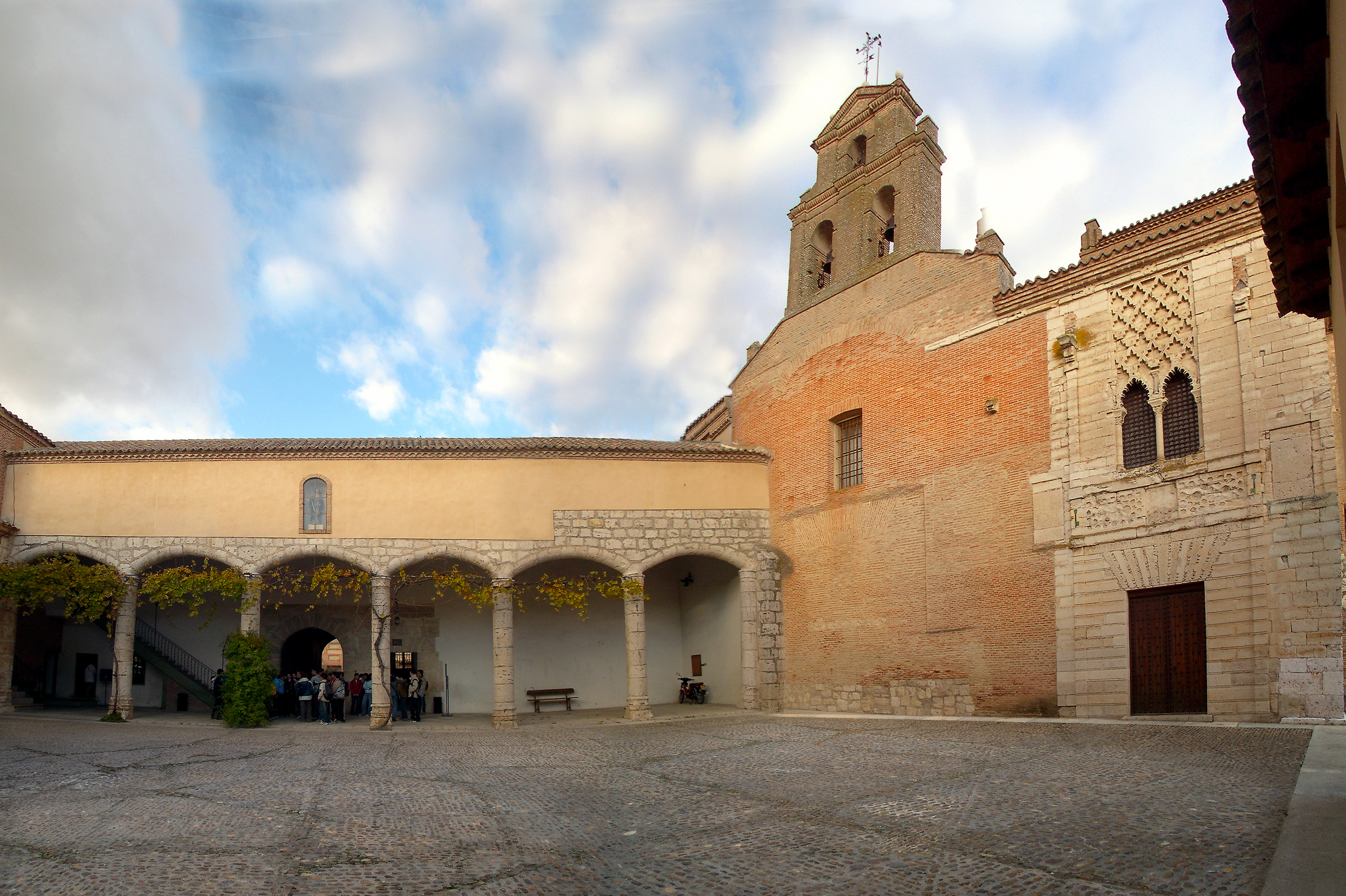
Real Monasterio de Santa Clara de Tordesillas

The Santa Clara buildings were originally built by King Alfonso XI as his palace in 1344. His son Peter the Cruel had it embellished by Mudéjar artists, beautiful works at Santa Clara, though on a much smaller scale than they did in the Alcázar of Seville. The facade, a lovely small patio, a chapel and the baths remain of Peter the Cruel's palace. Blanche de Bourbon was held here after her abandonment by Peter for María de Padilla in 1353. The former portal, blocked off now, has a particularly fine Mudéjar doorway. In 1363 he ceded Santa Clara to two of his daughters by María de Padilla. They turned it into a convent, but it retained its role as a royal palace.

In 1420 the Infante Don Enrique of Aragón burst into the palace and seized the person of John II, who escaped the Infante thanks to Álvaro de Luna. Queen Joanna of Castile and Aragon, who spent much of her life in confinement at the (later demolished) Royal Palace of Tordesillas, was first interred at the Santa Clara convent before her remains were transferred to Granada. The convent still holds a little clavichord reputed to have belonged to heritage.

== Plaza Mayor and churches ==
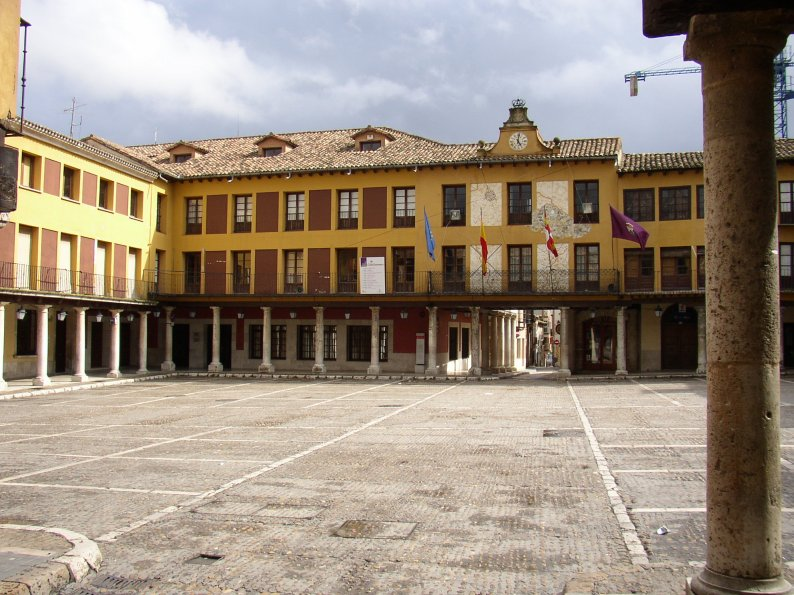
Plaza Mayor with colonnades.

The Plaza Mayor is the historic and attractive central community space framed by the 17th century colonnade and porticos creating the arcade that encircles it.

Nearby is the Church of Santa Maria, built from the sixteenth to the eighteenth centuries. It has a monumental baroque sacristy. The town's other landmark churches are San Juan, San Pedro, Santiago, and San Antolín.

The massive 15th-century Church of San Antolín is of special interest, containing a museum of religious art collected from churches in the vicinity. The spacious church interior has a single nave, and its most outstanding feature is the sumptuous Alderete Chapel, containing the 1550 alabaster tomb of Don Pedro de Alderete, Commander of the Order of Santiago.

There are also two other historic convents besides Santa Clara in Tordesillas — Convento de Carmelo and Convento de San Francisco.

== Festivals ==
The main feasts in Tordesillas are held in September; the date changes every year.

=== Festivities in honour of 'La Virgen de La Peña' ===
The celebrations are in honour of Our Lady 'La Virgen de la Peña', (Our Lady of the Rock) patron saint of the village and land of Tordesillas. Her hermitage is located on the other side of the river, where people arrive for the romería (pilgrimage) in carts drawn by decorated horses.

Celebrations begin on 8 September, Patron Saint's Day of Tordesillas, the 'Virgen de la Guía' (Our Guiding Lady).

Following Saturday to 8 September is called "Sábado de Faroles". (The Saturday of torches or lanterns made of wood). During the night there is the "Desfile de Faroles", a big parade where each competing "peña" (crew or team) carries a "farol" (which is somewhat bigger than a common streetlamp). Each side of the "farol" is painted with typical images about Tordesillas and about the festivities. Crews, accompanied by brass bands, take part in the parade carrying their "faroles", along the streets of the village. The crew judged to have the most beautiful farole is awarded a prize.

The guards' patrol through the old walls of Tordesillas gave rise to this curious celebration that traverses the whole village.

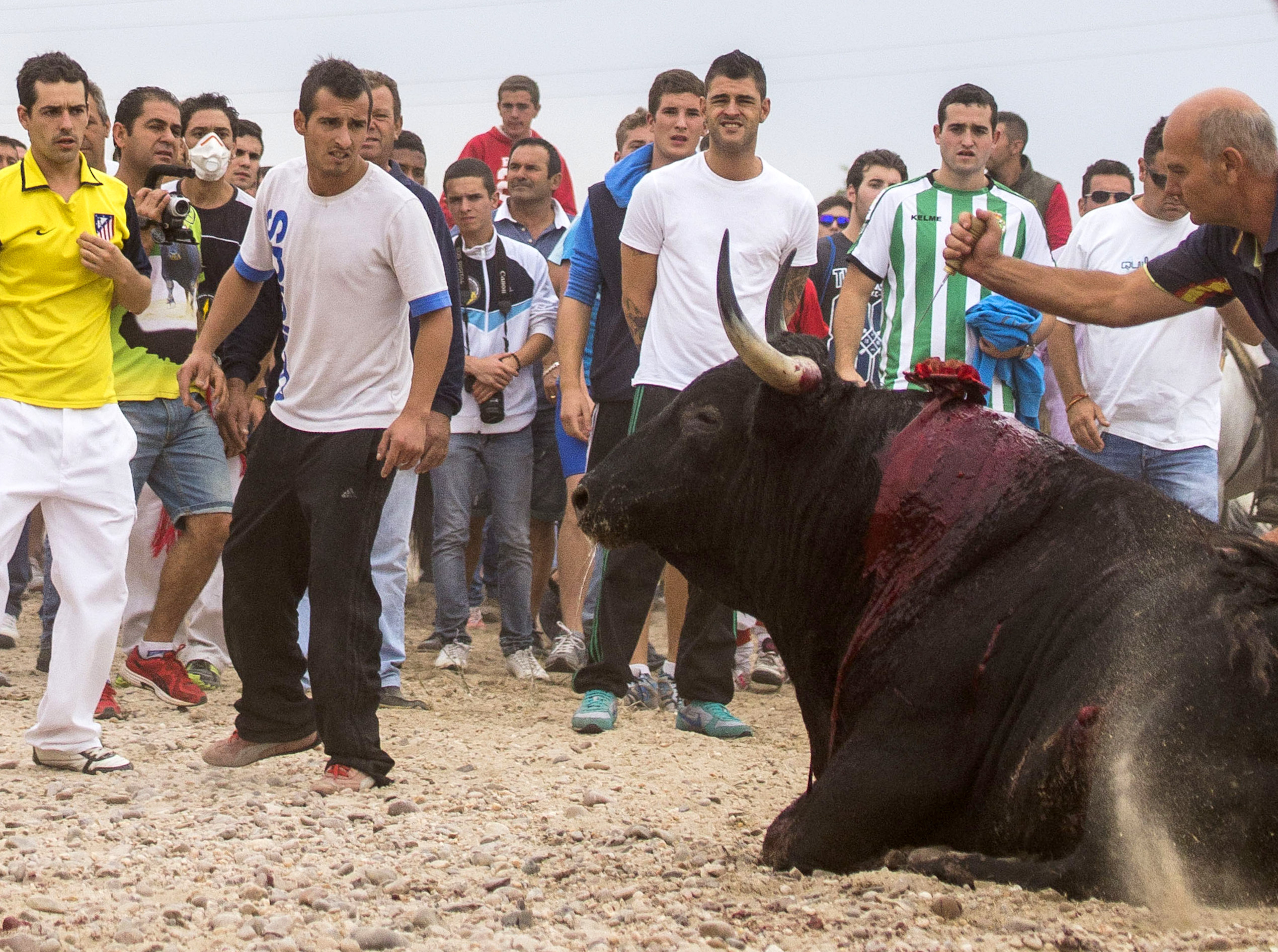
Festivities of Toro de la Vega (photo of 2014)

=== Torneo del Toro de la Vega ===
The "Virgen de la Peña" patron saint's day is celebrated on Sunday. The following Tuesday there was a well-known local tournament called, in Spanish, "Torneo del Toro de la Vega" (The Meadow Bull Tournament).

The bull was driven by horsemen and footmen all carrying spears. When it reached the meadow across the river it was finally speared and stabbed by many competing lancers. The person who delivered the fatal blow (this could be with a rifle) was entitled to cut off the bull's testicles and tie them to the tip of his spear and parade them through the town. The city then awarded him a gold medal and a commemorative forged iron spear.

This celebration was banned in 2016 by the regional government over rising concerns about violent clashes between those who held views in favor of the tournament and those against it. A perceived majority of the town's population supported the celebration while a growing number of Spaniards had come to know about it and were opposing this celebration over animal rights concerns. There had been attempts to block the celebration by members of animal-rights groups before and altercations between both locals and visitors in the years prior to the ban were escalating. The current format of the tournament involves the chasing of the bull without spears, and the bull is not killed. The name of the tournament is now El Toro de la Peña.

== Notable people ==
- Gonzalo Queipo de Llano (1875–1951), military leader
- Moses ha-Kohen de Tordesillas (fl. 1370s), Jewish controversialist

== See also ==
- Battle of Tordesillas (1520)
- Battle of Tordesillas (1812)
