= Royal Convent of Santa Clara =

Nunnery in Tordesillas, Spain

Coordinates: 41.5000°N 4.9972°W

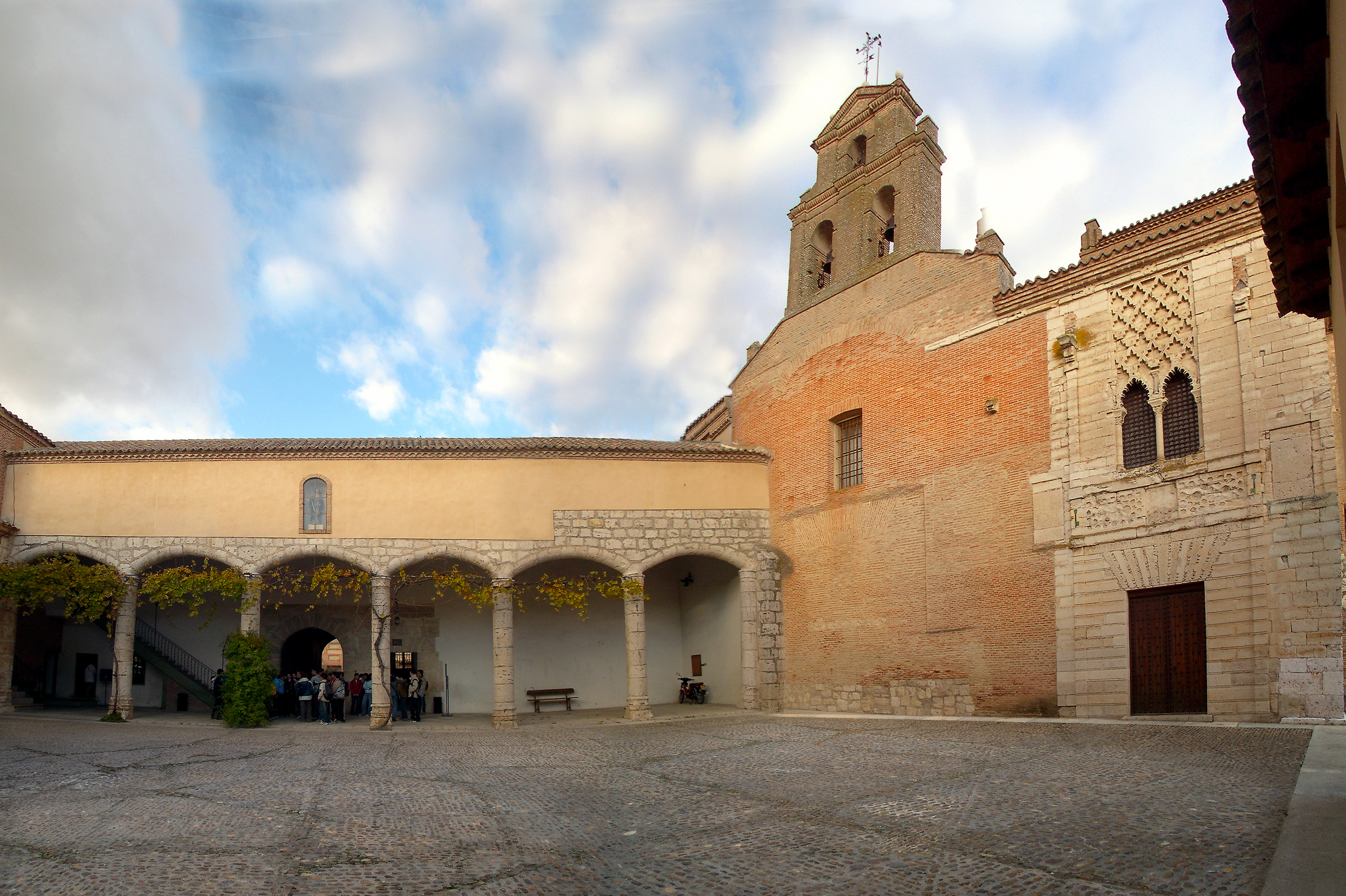
Entrance

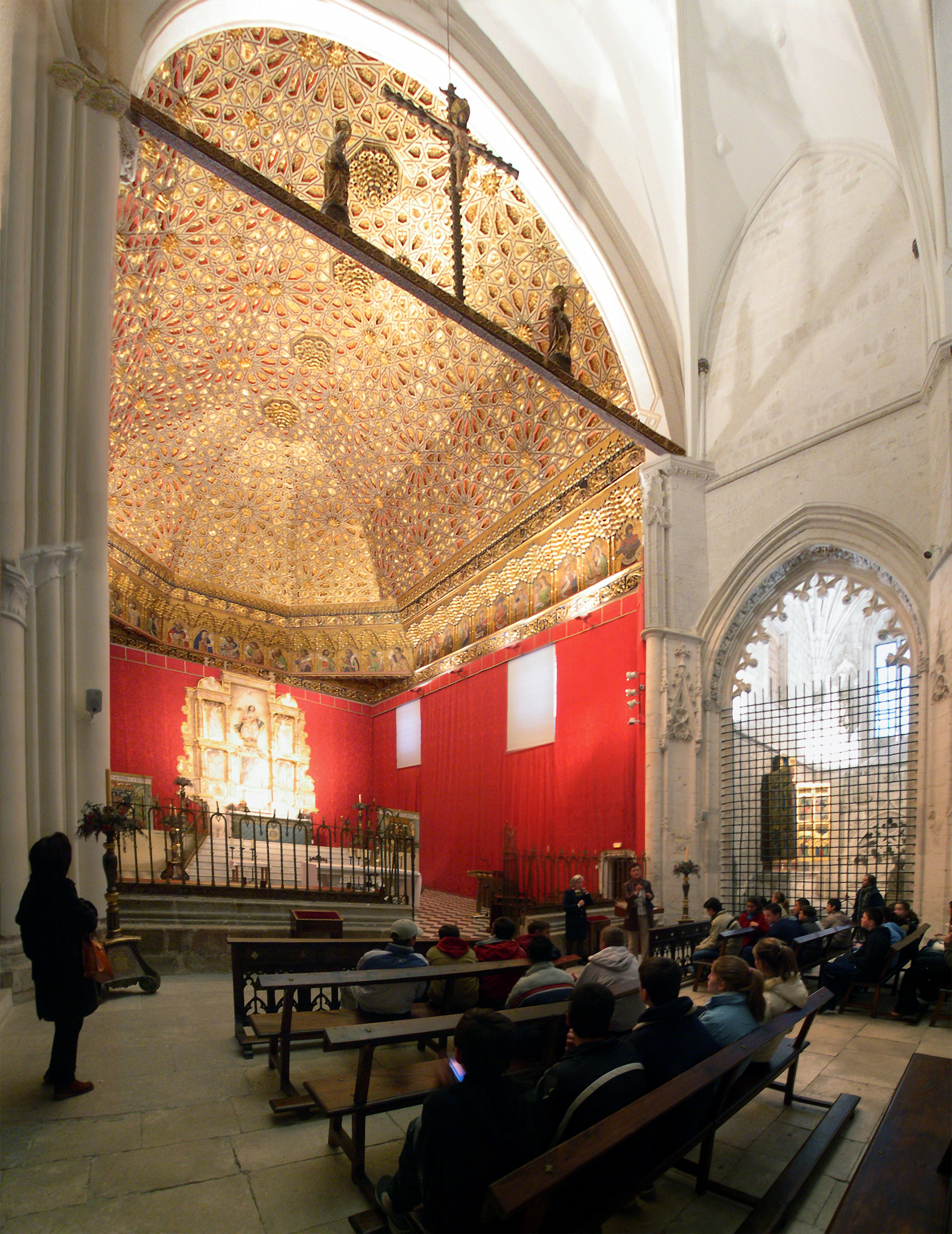
Interior of the church of the convent of Santa Clara

The Royal Convent of Santa Clara is a nunnery in Tordesillas, Spain. Founded by king Pedro of Castile in 1363, this convent of Poor Clares is now under the administration of Spain's national heritage organisation, the Patrimonio Nacional but still supports a community of 8 cloistered nuns as of 2024.

It is noted for its mudéjar architecture, such as the ceiling of the church. The ceiling employs a type of decoration called artesonado.

Fernando de Illescas reformed the convent in the late 14th century.

== See also ==
- Girih
- Islamic geometric patterns
