= Toro de la Vega =

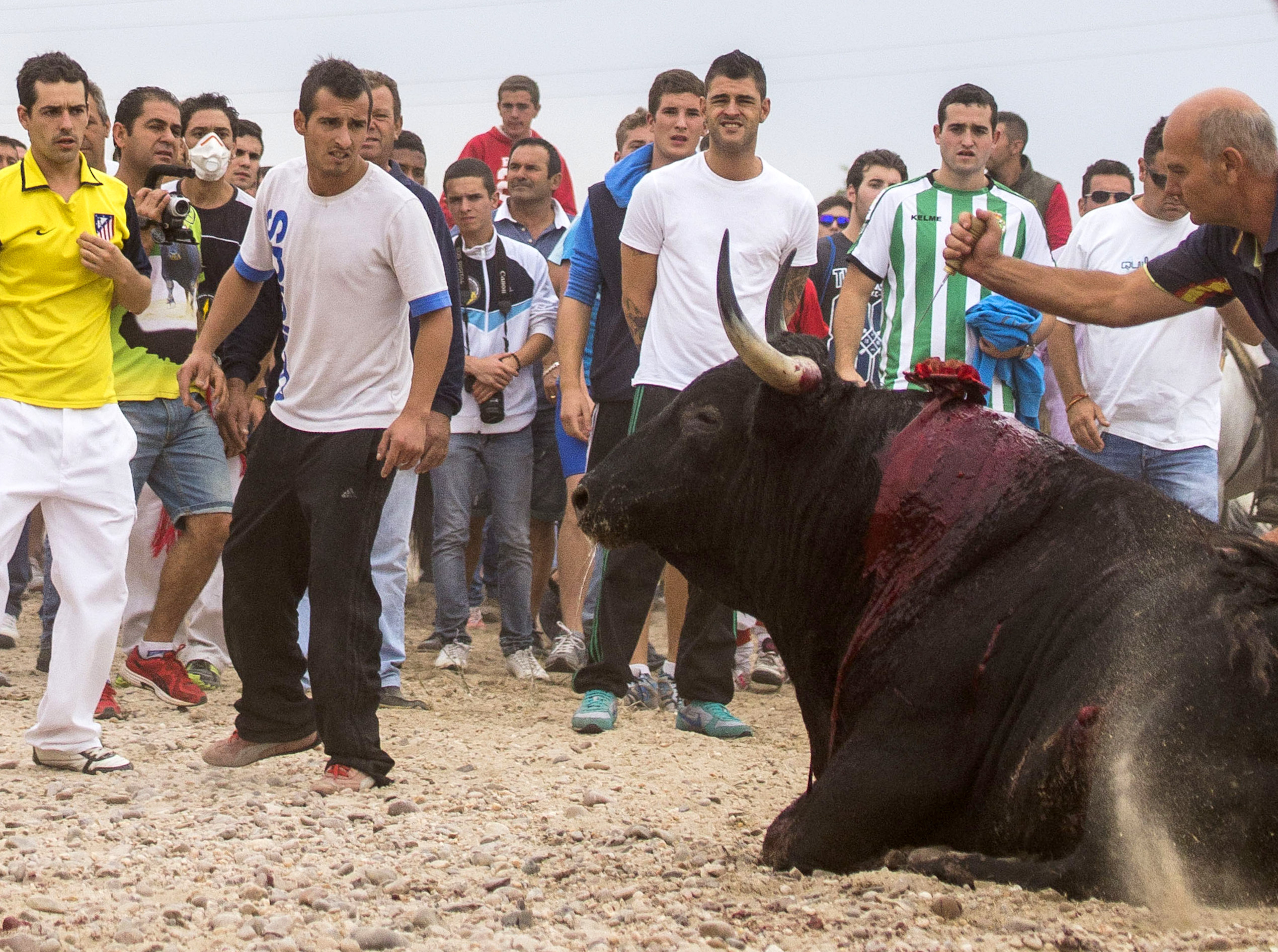
Lancing and death of a bull during Toro de la Vega in Tordesillas, Spain, 2014.

The Toro de la Vega (Bull of the Meadow) is a Spanish medieval bull festival and tournament celebrated in the town of Tordesillas in Valladolid, Spain. The tournament consists of hundreds of lancers chasing – either by foot or on horseback – a bull through town streets, corralling it into an open area. Once the bull has been drawn out away from town, it is killed by spearing. The tournament follows a series of strict rules and procedures dating back to the mid 16th century.

The festival has faced legal challenges from animal rights activists since the early 2010s, leading to a regional ban in 2016 and a ruling by the Spanish Supreme Court in 2019 outlawing the killing of bulls as part of the tournament. Since its initial regional ban, the festival has removed the killing portion of the ritual and billed itself as the Toro de la Peña (Bull of [Virgin Mary]).

== History ==
The festival has been held annually since 1524 with limited intermissions. The first recorded reference of bulls in relation to religious festivals in the region was mentioned in sacramental texts dating to 1534. During the rule of General Francisco Franco, the tournament was banned for a period of four years in Francoist Spain. In 1964, Franco sent soldiers to the town in an attempt to stop the festival but a bull was still released; the two lancers who claimed victory in that year's Toro de la Vega were imprisoned and beaten. The festival's treatment of bulls diminished Franco's reputation abroad during the 1960s. In 1993 and 1995, respectively, two bulls were pardoned by the townspeople for being able to escape.

The rise of animal rights activism in Spanish bullfighting has generated increased notoriety around the festival. The tournament has, as of 2019, been partially funded by revenues and government subsidies. The town council itself purchases bulls wholesale for the tournament, paying €6,000 for a bull in 2015. In September 2015, during the annual festivities, more than 10,000 locals protested against the Toro de la Vega in Madrid's Puerta del Sol. That year a variety of Spanish actors and musicians attended an "alternative and bloodless" bull run in Tordesillas to support animal rights activism. During that year's festival journalists J. Jiménez Gálvez and Antonio Lorca, both writing for El País, criticized supporters of the festival for comparing it to non-violent bullfighting or bull-running.

In May 2016, the regional government of Castile and León banned the killing of the bulls. The local Tordesillas government disapproved of the ruling and cautioned regional legislators that they would "not be welcome" in the town. The decision was widely denounced by town officials with the mayor promising to appeal and overturn the ruling. Local protests followed with banners reading Tordesillas no se rinde (Tordesillas isn't giving in). After the regional ban was passed, the ritual converted into a traditional encierro (bull run); it was rebilled as the Toro de la Peña (Bull of [Virgin Mary]). The first bull to survive the festival "in centuries" was 640 kg Pelado (aged five), during the September 2016 festival. In March 2019, the Spanish Supreme Court upheld a lawsuit by animal rights activists in Madrid, effectively banning public bull-killing. During the lawsuit, the local council in Tordesillas argued that the event was critical to their town's culture, with "40,000 fans attending the event [compared to] 100 animal activists."

== Tournament ==
The tournament consists of hundreds of lancers chasing – either by foot or on horseback – a bull through town streets, corralling it into an open area such as a meadow. In the town of Tordesillas, the bull is typically chased into the riverfront area of River Duero. Once the bull has been drawn out away from town, it is typically killed by spearing. The throwing of spears or lances is strictly prohibited as is the operation of motor vehicles. If the bull surpasses the limits of the tournament, or the lancers are not able to kill it, it will be pardoned. This includes if the bull escapes the territorial limits of the town. The winner of the tournament is the person who inflicts the mortal wound on the bull, bringing it to its knees. Following that, an accredited supervisor cuts the neck of the bull in a mercy killing. Participants can be fined up to €9,000 for breaking town ordinances and laws during the festival. Lancers who attempt to kill the bull are subject to arrest. Since the late 2010s, amid growing animal rights concerns, the tournament has featured a running of the bulls without the customary killing at the end.

The bull must weigh 500 kg and be between four and seven years old in order to participate in the festival.

The festivities are typically held annually in early September, on the second Tuesday of the month alongside the Virgen de la Peña religious festivals. It is most often held on 14 September.

During the tournament the town of Tordesillas' population doubles from 9,000 to 18,000.

== Name ==
The historical name of the tournament is Toro de la Vega, Spanish for "bull of the meadow"; the namesake of the regional geography of Tordesillas. The name Toro de la Peña derives its significance from the town's patron saint, the Virgen de la Peña (Virgin Mary); collectively, "Bull of [Virgin Mary]". When literally translated Toro de la Peña is noted as "Bull of the Rock".

The name was changed in 2016 after cumulative societal discontent with bull-killing.

The winner of the contest are themselves named after the festival; they are known as the "bull of the meadow".

== See also ==
- Anti-bullfighting city
- Running of the bulls
- Spanish-style bullfighting
