= Fernando de Illescas =

Fernando González Fernández (fl. 1380–1419), called Fernando de Illescas, was a Franciscan confessor, reformer and bibliophile, one of the most influential churchmen in Castile during the reigns of John I and Henry III, whom he served as a diplomat. A partisan of the Avignon Papacy at the height of the Western Schism, he attended the Council of Perpignan (1408) and the Council of Constance (1416), but played only a minor role in trying to end the schism.

== Life ==
Fernando was born in Illescas in the second half of the 14th century to Alfonso González and Mencía Fernández. He adopted his birthplace as a toponymic surname upon entering the Franciscan order. He had two brothers, Juan and Alfonso, who became bishop of Zamora and bishop of Burgos, respectively. Another relative, Diego Díaz, studied canon law in Avignon.

=== Diplomatic mission concerning the schism ===
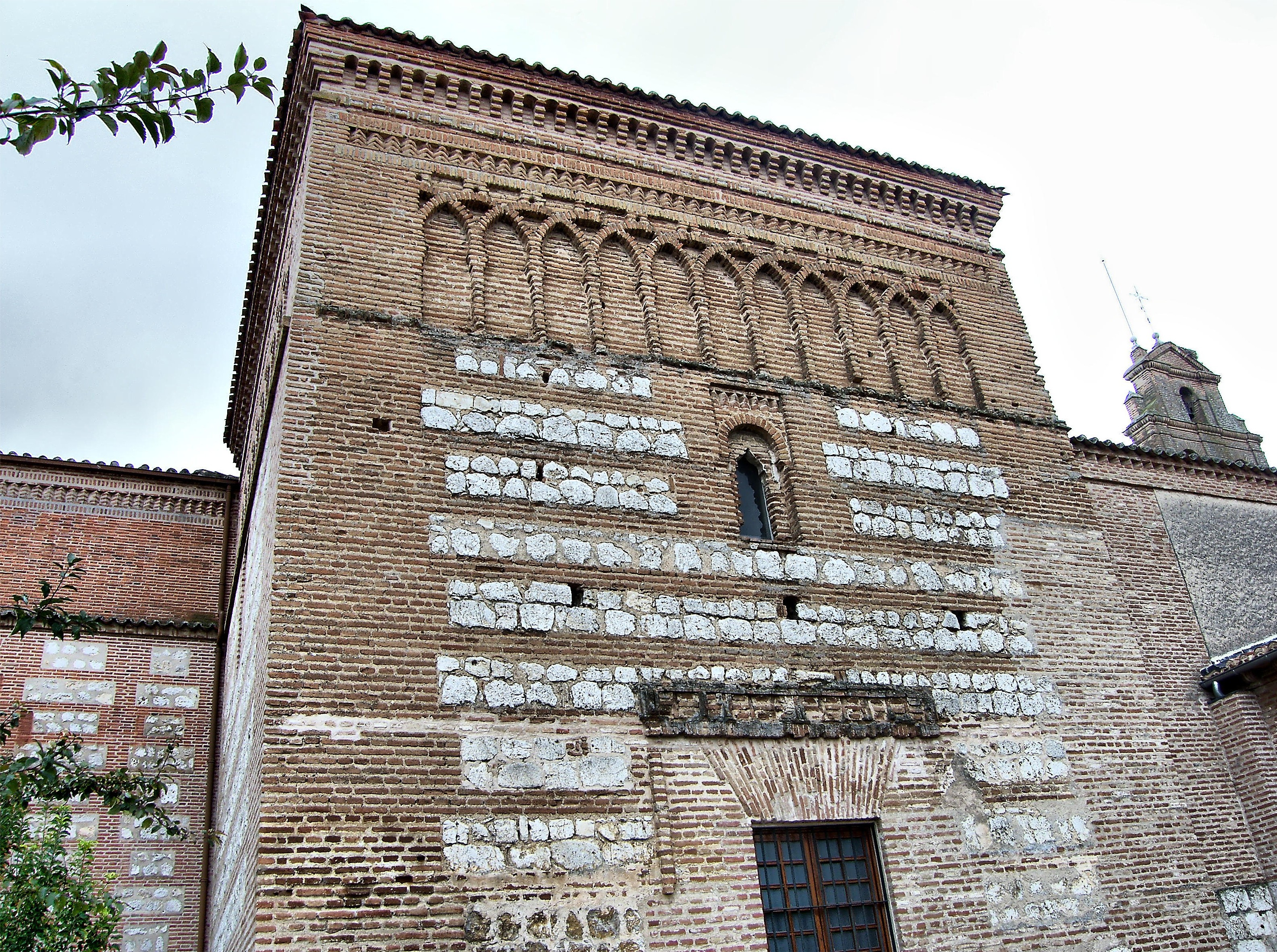
Fernando was charged with reforming the Poor Clare house of Tordesillas

John I, who succeeded in 1379, named Fernando his confessor and almost immediately sent him with two others, Ruy Bernárdez and Álvaro Meléndez, on a diplomatic mission to the courts of the two competing popes, Clement VII at Avignon and Urban VI at Rome. The purpose of the mission was to gather evidence regarding which of the two popes was legitimate and should be recognized by Castile. Fernando travelled first to Avignon early in 1380, where he heard from 32 witnesses, including ten cardinals. On 26 May, Clement wrote to John to inform him that he had received his ambassadors. Ferdinand and the other two then went to the Kingdom of Naples, where he heard from two cardinals before continuing on to Rome in August, where he heard from 29 witnesses. He arrived back in Castile on 27 September.

Fernando was not a neutral diplomat. He favoured Clement and opposed Urban. On 16 May 1380, he accepted from Clement an appointment as papal visitor to the convent of Poor Clares of Santa Clara de Tordesillas with plenary powers to reform it, ratified by the papal bull Ex debita on 16 November. As a result of these and other diplomatic manoeuvres, by May 1381 John had decided in favour of Clement, who rewarded Fernando by appointing him papal chaplain and renewing his rights of visitation in Santa Clara on 3 August 1382. On 13 November, Fernando was in Avignon, where he was given a post in the Apostolic Penitentiary.

=== Further service to John I and Henry III ===
In 1383, John I sent Fernando on an embassy to Navarre. The purpose of this mission is unknown. Fernando received a gift of four silver cups from the royal almoner of Navarre. In 1385, he received further pieces of silver from Navarre.

John I relied on Fernando's advice, based on his travels in 1380, when in 1383 he assembled the Cortes at Segovia to switch the calendar from the Hispanic era to the era of the Incarnation. Following the defeat of his forces at the battle of Aljubarrota in 1385, he sent Fernando to negotiate a truce with Portugal (February 1389). Fernando was part of the delegation that then negotiated a six-year extension to the truce (29 November 1389).

In 1390, Fernando was one of the six executors of the will of John I. He served John's young successor, Henry III, as tutor and confessor. In 1394, he was sent on to Avignon with Pedro López de Ayala and Juan Rodríguez to greet the new pope, Benedict XIII. On this mission, Fernando requested a canonry in Toledo for Diego Díaz.

In 1406, Fernando was one of Henry III's four executors.

=== Service of Avignon ===
On 10 March 1404, Benedict XIII appointed Fernando and the prior of Santa María de Guadalupe to examine the regulations of the Hieronymites of Santa María de Sisla so that they could receive papal confirmation. On 21 March 1404, Benedict renewed Fernando's powers in Santa Clara and extended them to Frechos in the diocese of León, while also granting Fernando the right to name his successor.

On 17 August 1408, Benedict wrote to Bishop Francesc Climent Sapera asking him to send Fernando de Illescas to Avignon and to provide him with whatever escort or money he needed. Fernando arrived in Avignon that year and attended the Council of Perpignan. Although he left Avignon after that, he had returned by 19 October 1411. On 19 September 1410, Fernando was appointed visitor of the Poor Clares of Santander.

For the next four years, Fernando was attached to the Apostolic Camera in Avignon. He attended the Council of Constance as a delegate of Castile. In March 1316, he travelled to Peniscola to convince Benedict XIII to resign and end the schism. He failed in this and his other actions at the council seem to have borne little fruit. He continued to work at Avignon until at least 17 October 1415.

== Death ==
Fernando's date of death is unknown. He collected an expansive theological library during his travels through Spain, Portugal, Italy and France. Towards the end of his life, he donated it to the Franciscan convent in San Juan de Toledo. The last record of him is dated 16 August 1419, when Pope Martin V ordered the convent not to disperse the books. Fernando probably died not long after. Much of the collection was lost to fire in 1755.

== Bibliography ==
- Beltrán de Heredia, Vicente, ed. (1966). Bulario de la Universidad de Salamanca (1219–1549). Vol. 1. Ediciones Universidad de Salamanca.
- Gouveia Monteiro, João (2020). "Casualties and the Aftermath". In Luís Adão Fonseca; João Gouveia Monteiro; Maria Cristina Pimenta (eds.). The Aljubarrota Battle and Its Contemporary Heritage. Amsterdam University Press. pp. 67–74. doi:10.1515/9781641890625.
- Rodríguez de la Torre, Fernando (2018). "González Fernández, Fernando". Diccionario biográfico español. Real Academia de la Historia.
- López Fernández, Anastasio (1928). "Fray Fernando de Illescas, confesor de los reyes de Castilla Juan I y Enrique III". Archivo Ibero-Americano. 30: 241–252.
- Villarroel González, Óscar (2019). "Fernando de Illescas: los servicios diplomáticos de un fraile castellano". In José Antonio Chelle Ortega; José Marcos García Isaac; Óscar Villarroel González (eds.). Entre el cielo y la tierra: el papel de los eclesiásticos en los círculos de poder en los reinos ibéricos (1369–1504). La Ergástula. pp. 131–149.
