= Torrecilla de la Orden =

Coordinates: 41°13′N 5°13′W

Torrecilla de la Orden, Spain
- Flag Coat of arms

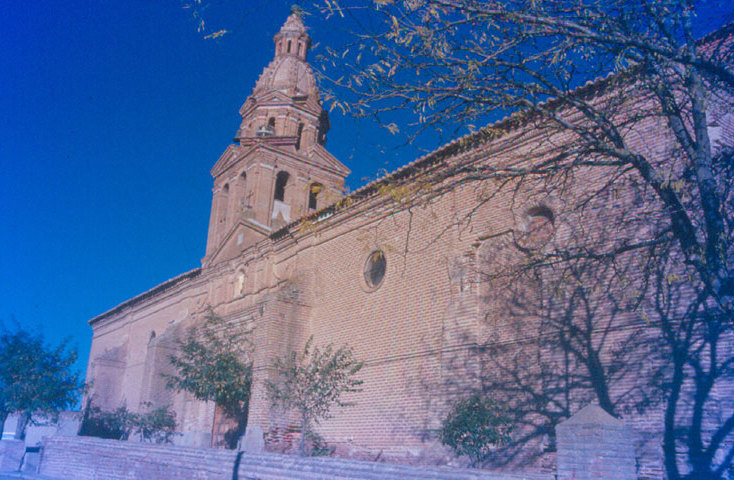
- Church of Santa Maria
- Country: Spain
- Autonomous community: Castile and León
- Province: Valladolid
- Municipality: Torrecilla de la Orden

Area
  - Total: 59 km^{2} (23 sq mi)

Population (2025-01-01)
  - Total: 226
  - Density: 3.8/km^{2} (9.9/sq mi)
- Time zone: UTC+1 (CET)
  - Summer (DST): UTC+2 (CEST)

Torrecilla de la Orden is a municipality located in the province of Valladolid, Castile and León, Spain. According to the 2004 census (INE), the municipality has a population of 332 inhabitants.
