= Illescas Peninsula =

Peninsula in Peru

Coordinates: 5°55′32″S 81°02′50″W

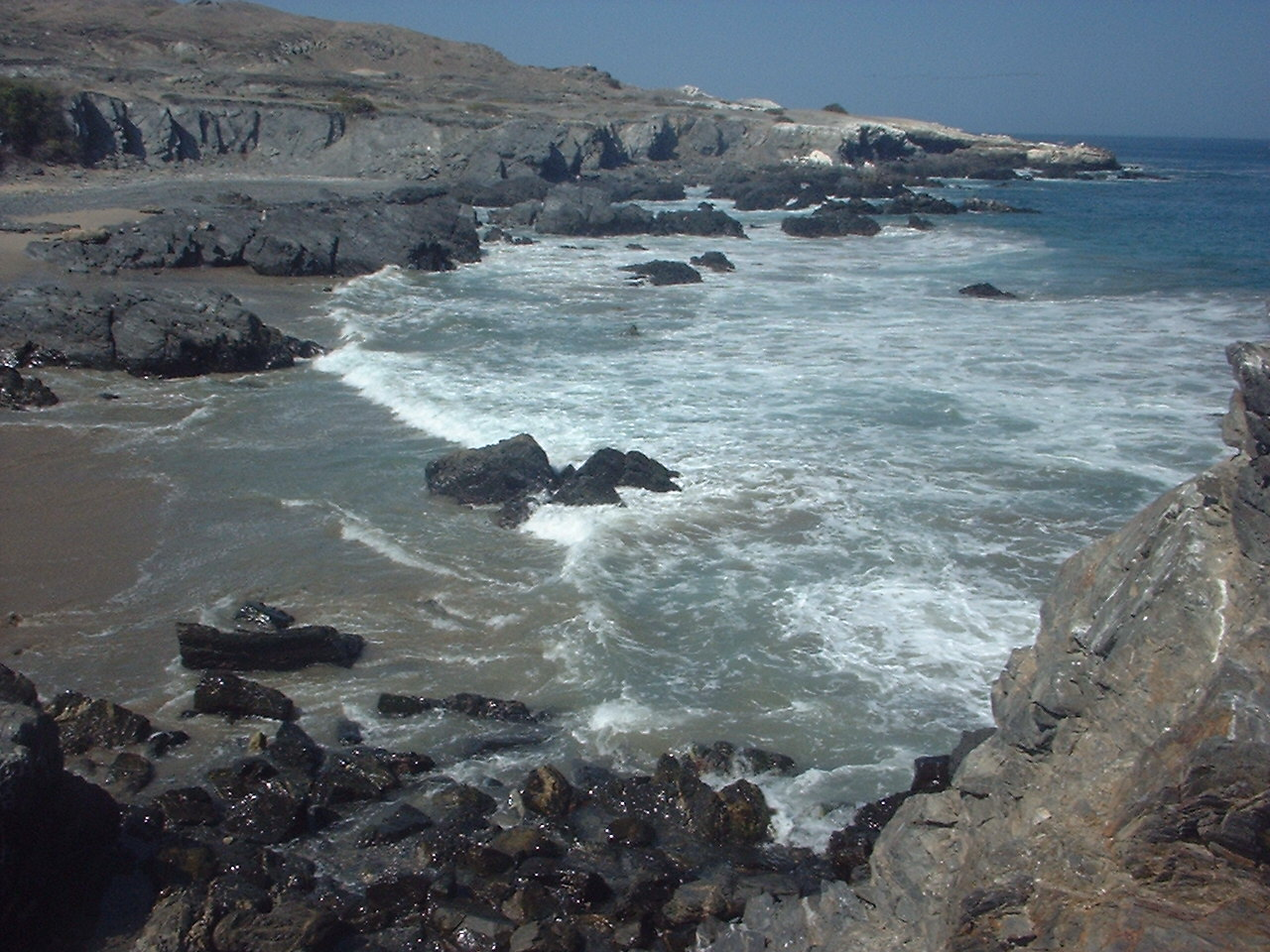
Illescas Peninsula

Illescas is a peninsula in northwestern Peru. It forms the southern boundary of the Sechura Bay, the largest bay in Peru. Sechura Bay also includes the northernmost portion of the Pacific Ocean that is under the influence of the Peru-Chile or Humboldt Current. The Illescas Peninsula is located in the department of Piura, and is scarcely inhabited. Part of Illescas was declared a reserved zone. Illescas is also the name given to the highest point of the peninsula (500 m.), the Cerro Illescas.

== A mountain between sea and a flatland desert ==
The Peninsula and Cerro Illescas are located more than 150 km west of the Andes, in the middle of a flatland desert, the Sechura Desert. The cerro is a series of small hills (up to 500 m. in elevation) interspersed by narrow and short valleys formed during rare rain events. Vegetation cover is extremely reduced in the peninsula, and only a few shrub and tree species grow in the area, especially mesquite trees and shrubs locally known as zapote. An endemic species of fox, the Sechura fox is found in the peninsula. Along the coast, and at its westernmost point, there are colonies of sea lions, blue-footed boobies and Humboldt penguins.

== Regions ==
The only human settlement of the Illescas Peninsula is the fishermen town of Bayovar.

== Geographic features ==
- The Punta Aguja is the westernmost point of the peninsula, and is inhabited by colonies of marine mammals and seabirds.
- At the south end of Illescas, Playa sin fin extends for more than 100 km, and is the largest uninterrupted sandy shore along the Peruvian coastline.
- The Bayovar depression is an area north of Illescas, where a large area of the ground is below sea level (-34 m.). Large deposits of phosphorus ores and diatomite are found near the Bayovar depression.
- The Estuario de Virrilá is a 30 km long canal entering the Sechura Desert from the Sechura Bay. Despite its name, it is not an estuary.
