= Torrecilla de la Abadesa =

Coordinates: 41°29′N 5°05′W

Torrecilla de la Abadesa, Spain
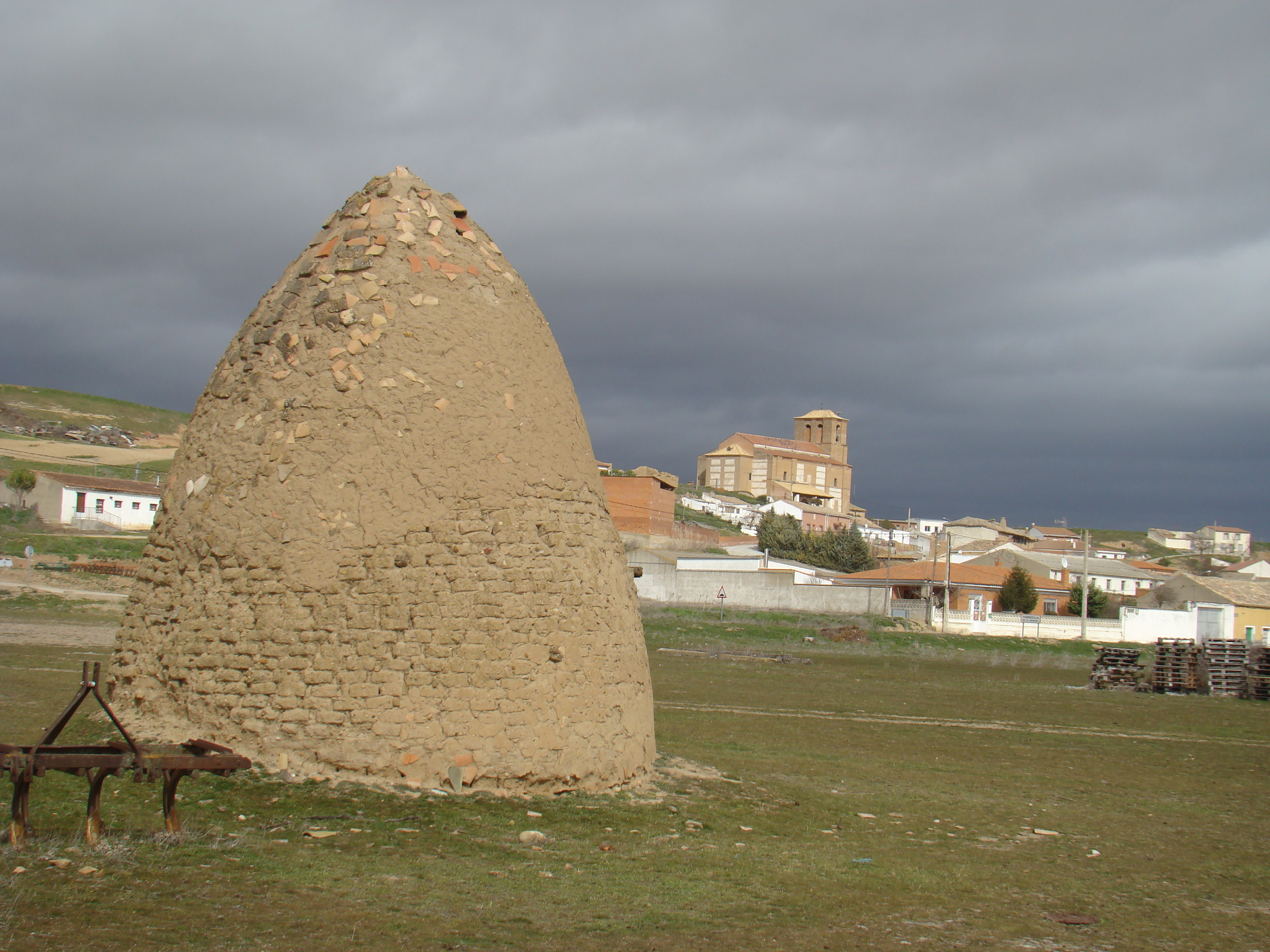

- Coat of arms
- Interactive map of Torrecilla de la Abadesa, Spain
- Country: Spain
- Autonomous community: Castile and León
- Province: Valladolid
- Municipality: Torrecilla de la Abadesa

Area
  - Total: 26 km^{2} (10 sq mi)

Population (2025-01-01)
  - Total: 237
  - Density: 9.1/km^{2} (24/sq mi)
- Time zone: UTC+1 (CET)
  - Summer (DST): UTC+2 (CEST)

Torrecilla de la Abadesa is a municipality located in the province of Valladolid, Castile and León, Spain. According to the 2004 census (INE), the municipality has a population of 326 inhabitants.

Festivities:

- Saint Anthony of Padua (June 13)
- Saint Roch (August 16)
- Saint Stephen The Protomartyr (December 26)
- Saint Agatha (February 5)
- Los Quintos (May 1)
