= Convento de San Juan de la Penitencia, Toledo =

Building in Castile-La Mancha, Spain

Coordinates: 39.8557°N 4.0217°W

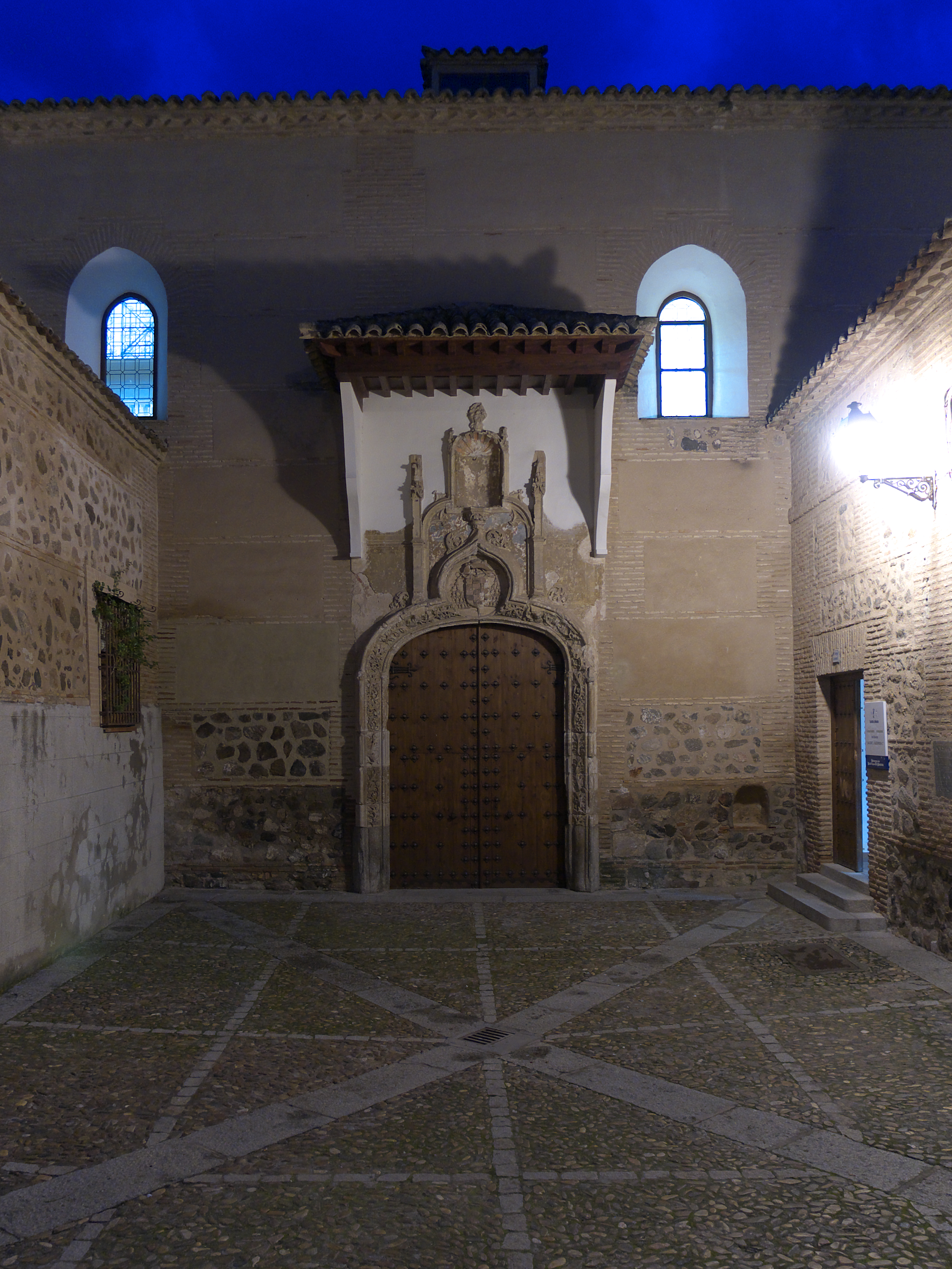
Facade of the Convento de San Juan de la Penitencia

The Convento de San Juan de la Penitencia, also known as the Colegio de Doncellas pobres de San Juan de la Penitencia, is an Isabelline former convent building that was erected in 1514 in Toledo, Spain.

The convent was established to rescue women from the street until they marry or to insert them into religious life.

The convent was commissioned by Don Francisco Jiménez de Cisneros and built by architect Pedro Gumiel, combining elements of Moorish style with the Renaissance. The altarpiece was made by Alejandro Semini.

The convent building suffered a devastating fire in 1936. It later served as a refuge for the homeless after the Spanish Civil War.

The building currently houses the Music Conservatory and the Center for International Studies of the Ortega y Gasset Foundation.
