= Monastery of San Juan de los Reyes =

Spanish monastery

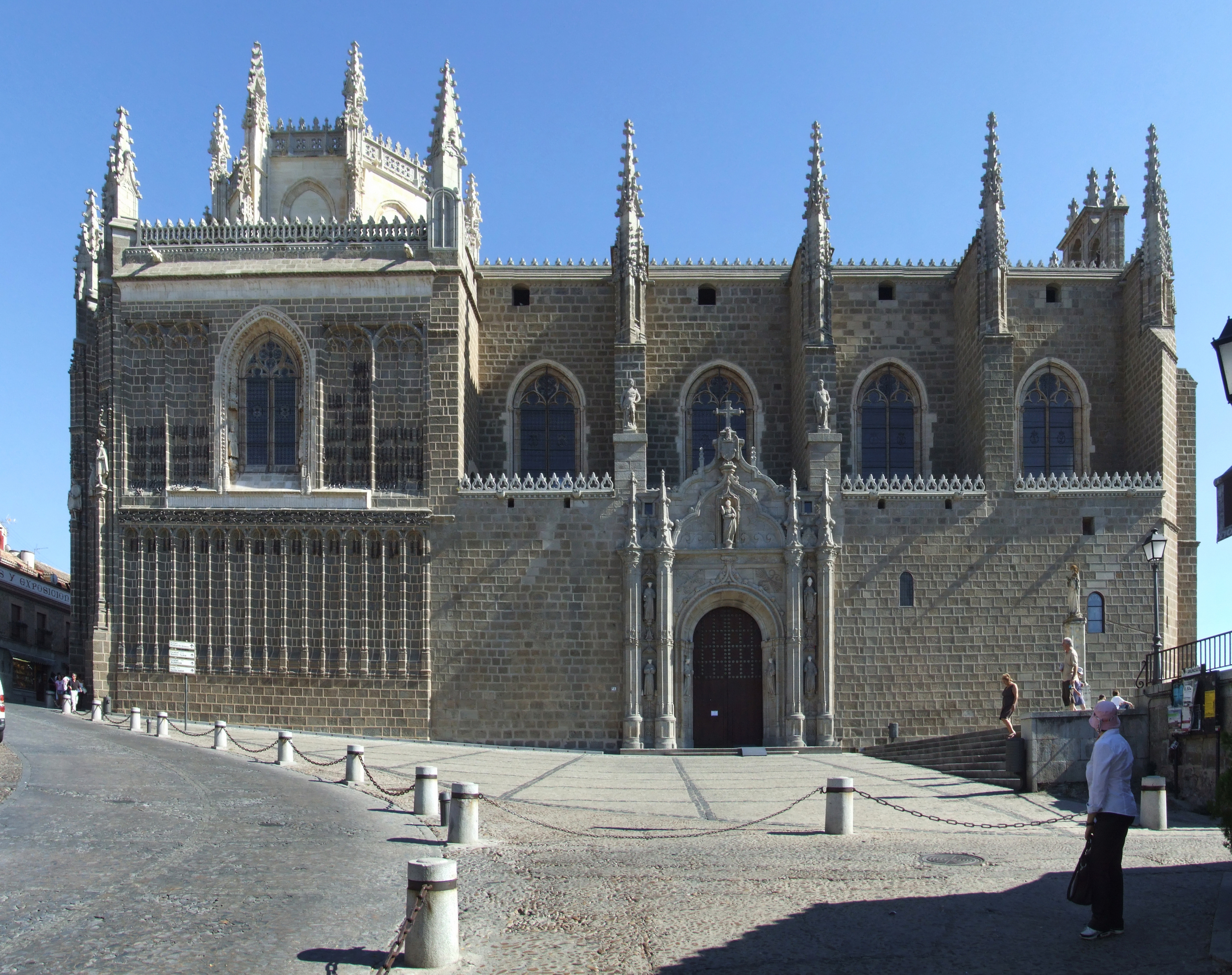
- Monastery of San Juan de los Reyes

- Location within Castilla-La Mancha Location within Spain
- Interactive map of Monastery of San Juan de los Reyes

Monastery information
- Other name: San Juan de la Reyna
- Dedication: Saint John the Evangelist

People
- Founders: King Ferdinand II of Aragon and Queen Isabella I of Castile

Architecture
- Architect: Juan Guas
- Style: Isabelline
- Groundbreaking: 1477
- Completion date: 1504

Site
- Location: Toledo, Castile-La Mancha, Spain
- Coordinates: 39°51′28″N 4°1′54″W

The Monastery of San Juan de los Reyes (English: Monastery of Saint John of the Monarchs) is an Isabelline style Franciscan monastery in Toledo, in Castile-La Mancha, Spain, built by the Catholic Monarchs (1477–1504).

== A monument to celebrate ==
This monastery was founded by King Ferdinand II of Aragon and Queen Isabella I of Castile to commemorate both the birth of their son, Prince John, and their victory at the Battle of Toro (1476) over the army of Afonso V of Portugal.

Prince John of Portugal also celebrated his victory over the Castilian army of the Catholic monarchs with a solemn procession on each anniversary of the battle. This apparent contradiction was a consequence of the indecisive military outcome of the battle: the troops under Afonso V broke while the forces led by Prince John of Portugal defeated the Castilian right wing and remained in possession of the battlefield.

Undoubtedly, the battle represented a decisive political victory for the Catholic Monarchs, assuring them the throne and paving the way for the future united kingdoms of Spain. As summarized by the Spanish academic historian Rafael Casas:

"...San Juan de los Reyes resulted from the royal will to build a monastery to commemorate the victory in a battle with an uncertain outcome but decisive, the one fought in Toro in 1476, which consolidated the union of the two most important Peninsular Kingdoms."

Toledo was chosen as the site for building the monastery due to its central geographic location and because it had been the capital of the ancient Visigoth kingdom, symbolically reconstituted by Isabella and Ferdinand with the restoration of the lost unity of Spain, through the union of Castile with Aragon.

== History ==
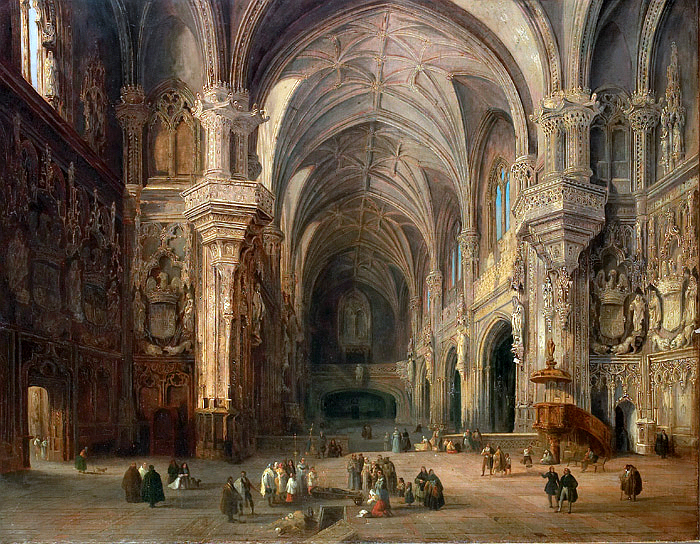
San Juan de los Reyes by Jenaro Pérez Villaamil inflates the scale for pictorial effect.

This monastery was initially named "San Juan de la Reyna" and was conceived to be the mausoleum of the Catholic Monarchs. They would change their plans later, choosing Granada as their burial place, after its reconquest in 1492.

The monastery's construction began in 1477 following plans drawn by architect Juan Guas, and was completed in 1504. It was dedicated to Saint John the Evangelist for use by Franciscan friars. In 1809 the monastery was badly damaged by Napoleon's troops during their occupation of Toledo, and abandoned in 1835. Restoration began in 1883 but was not completed until 1967. The monastery was restored to the Franciscan order in 1954.

== Description ==
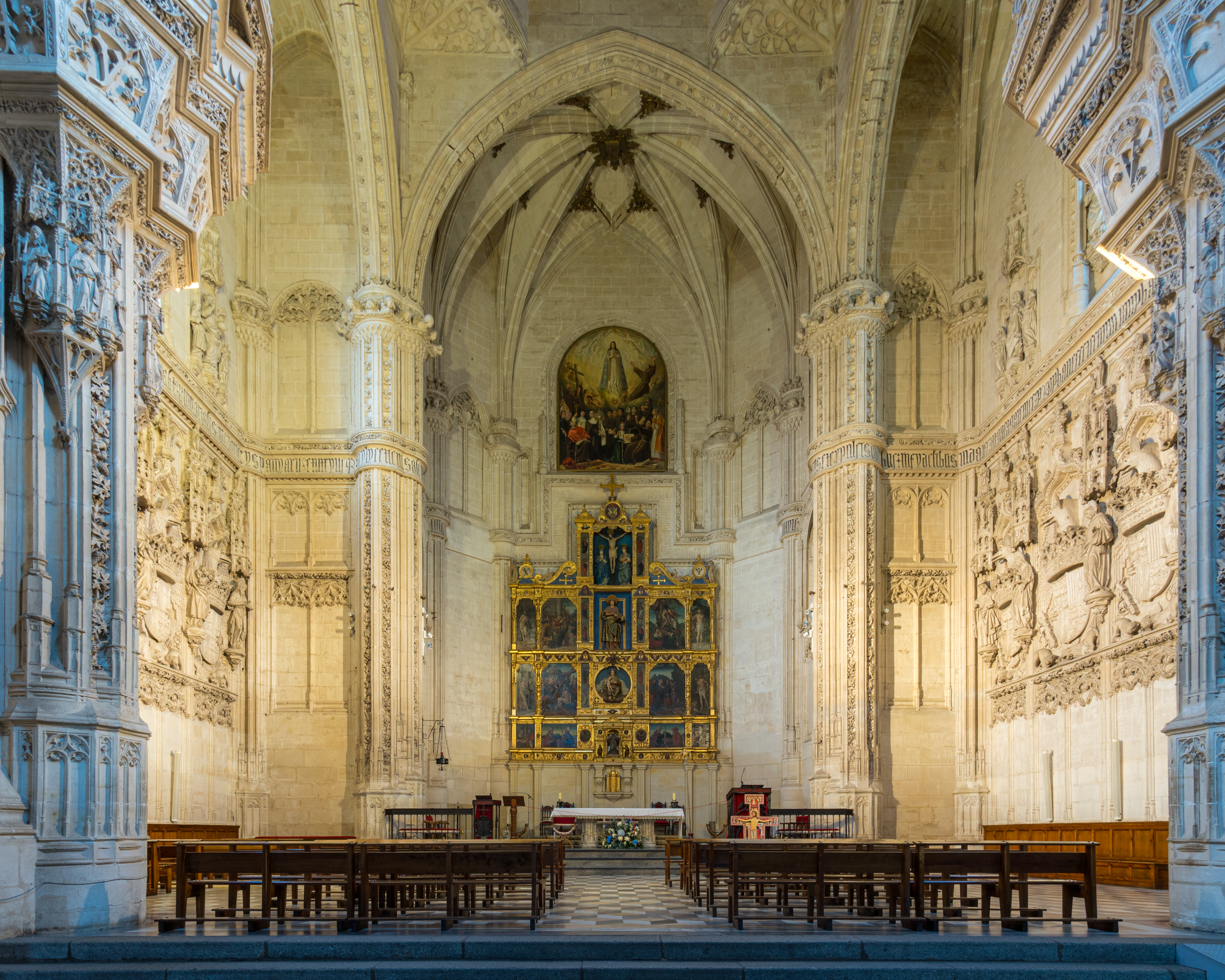
Main chapel of the church.

The monastery is an example of the Isabelline style. Its church is in the form of a Latin cross, with short arms, an elongated nave (approximately 50 metres in length, and 30 metres high), and side chapels situated between the domed arches – three chapels on either side of the nave, and two more under the choir. The church is notable for its decoration of the coats of arms of the Catholic Monarchs held by eagles. Its chancel is decorated with an altar (mid-16th century) from the former Santa Cruz Hospital by sculptor Felipe Bigarny and painter Francisco de Comontes, depicting scenes from the Passion and the Resurrection, as well as two scenes of the Santa Cruz legend.

Its cloister has a small garden. The ground floor's ceiling is formed of German cross vaults set with figures of saints interspersed with animal and plant motifs, all created by the Toledo sculptor Cecilio Béjar in the 20th century. Its upper cloisters, first completed in 1526 and restored in the 19th century, contain Mudéjar ornamentation, including a ceiling of larch wood, painted with the motifs and coats of arms of the Catholic Monarchs, and the motto Tanto monta, monta tanto. The monastery building is traditionally said to have been commissioned by Queen Isabel and King Ferdinand II to commemorate their victory over the Portuguese-Castilian forces of Afonso V and Prince John at the Battle of Toro in 1476. To symbolize the victory of the Christians in the years-long Granada campaign, its granite exterior facade is festooned, as per the Queen's order of 1494, with the manacles and shackles worn by Christian prisoners from Granada held by the Moors and released during the Reconquista.

== Gallery ==
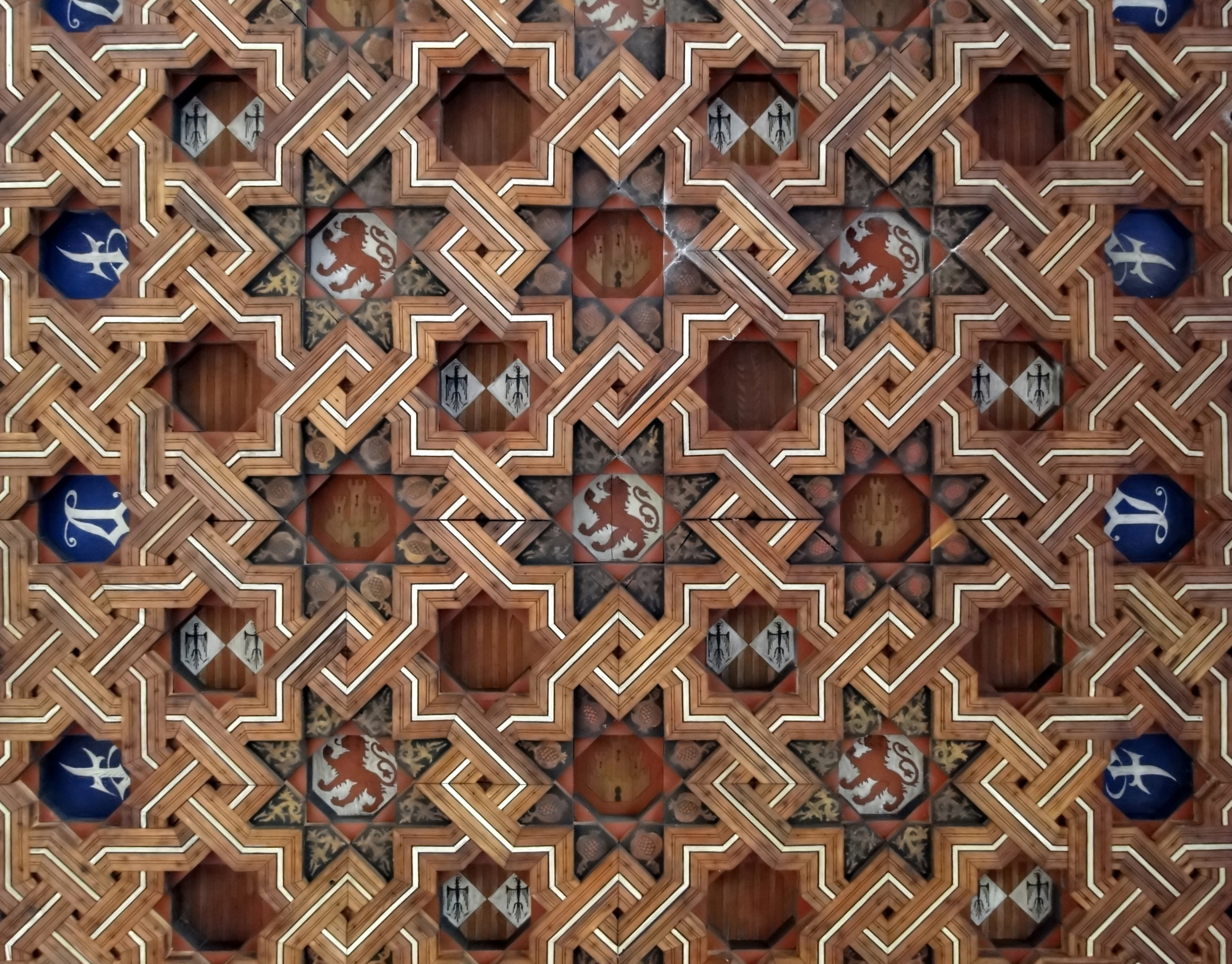
Detail of Mudéjar ceiling in the cloister

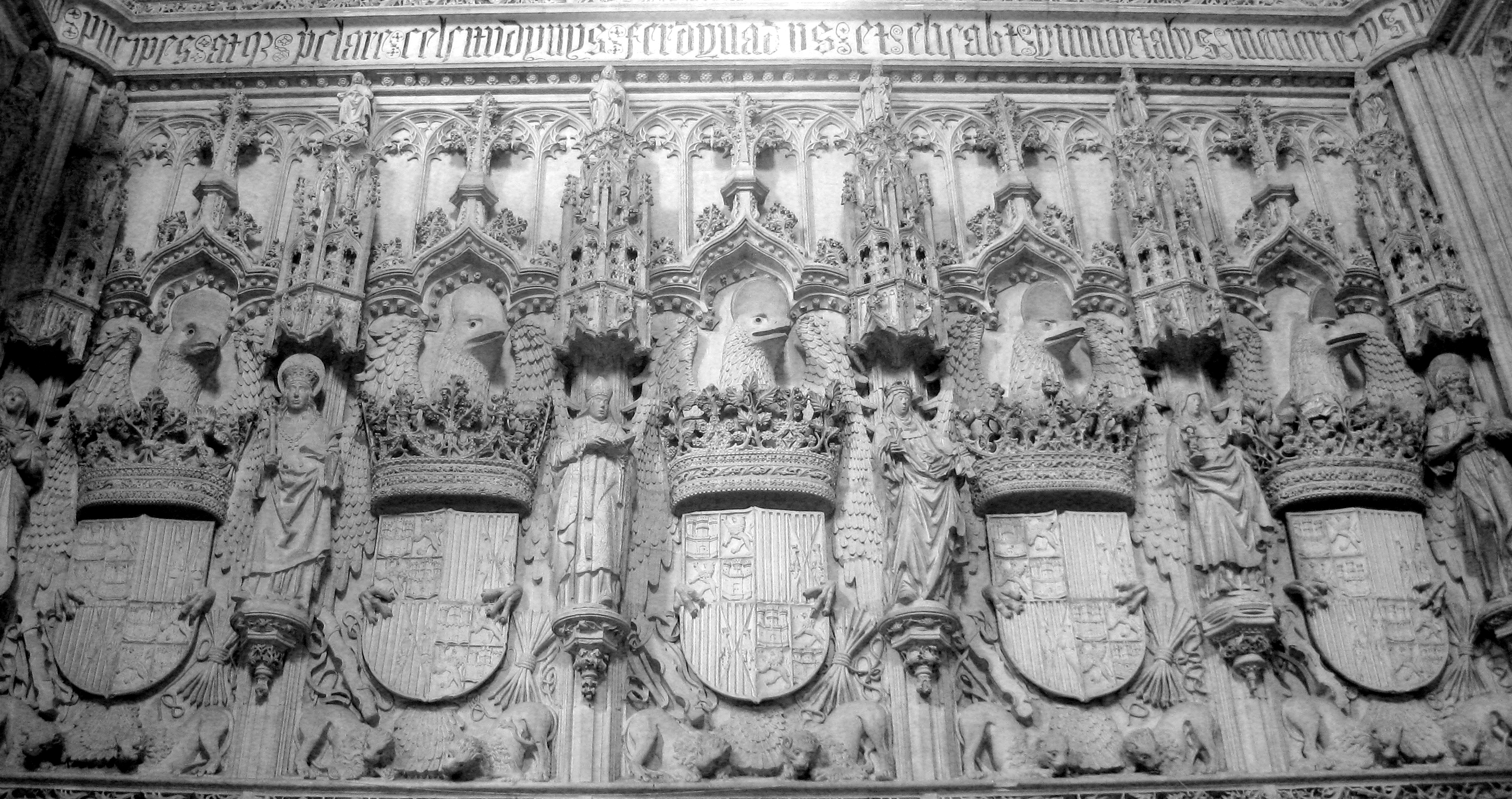
Reliefs with the coats of the Catholic Monarchs inside the church

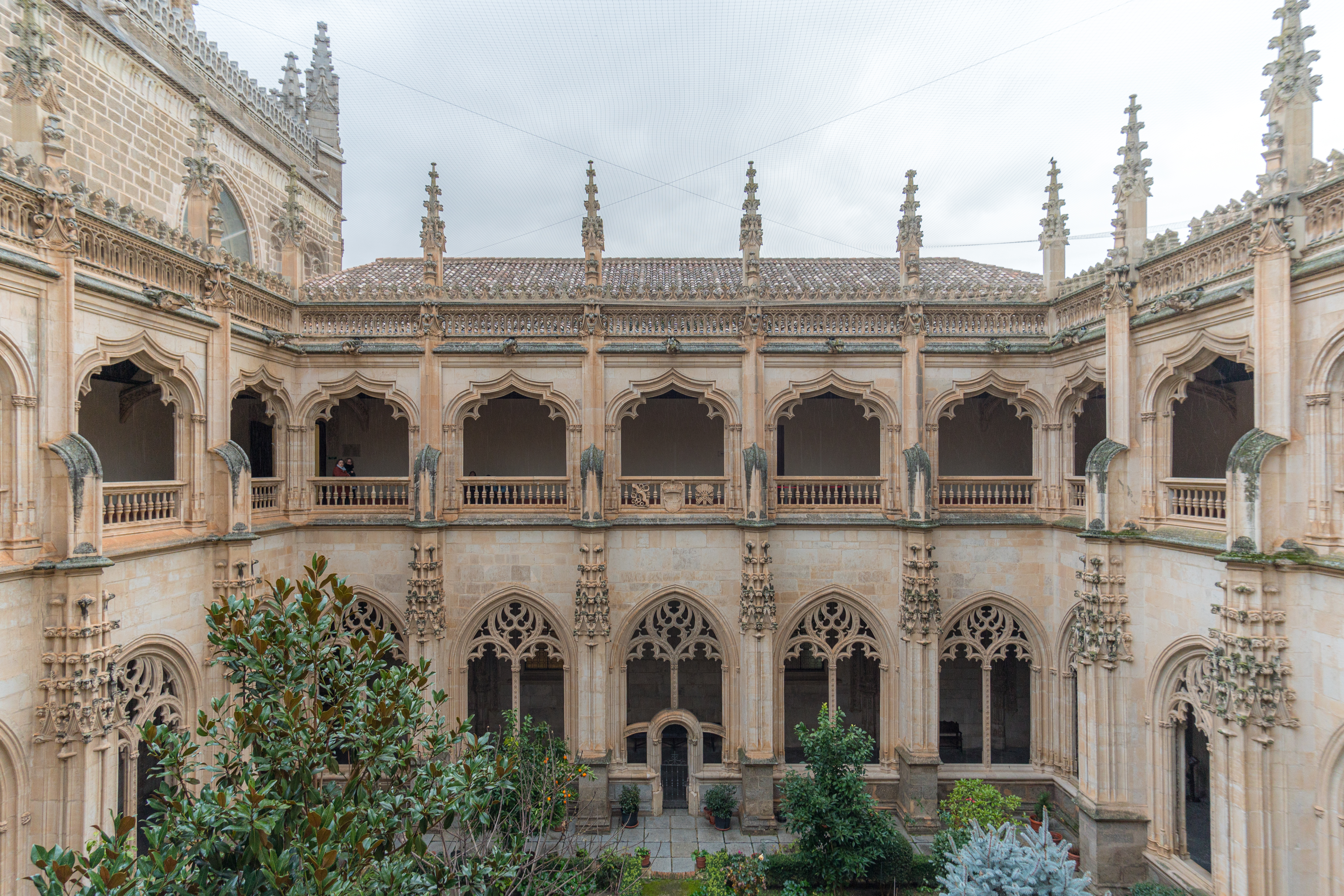
Cloister overview

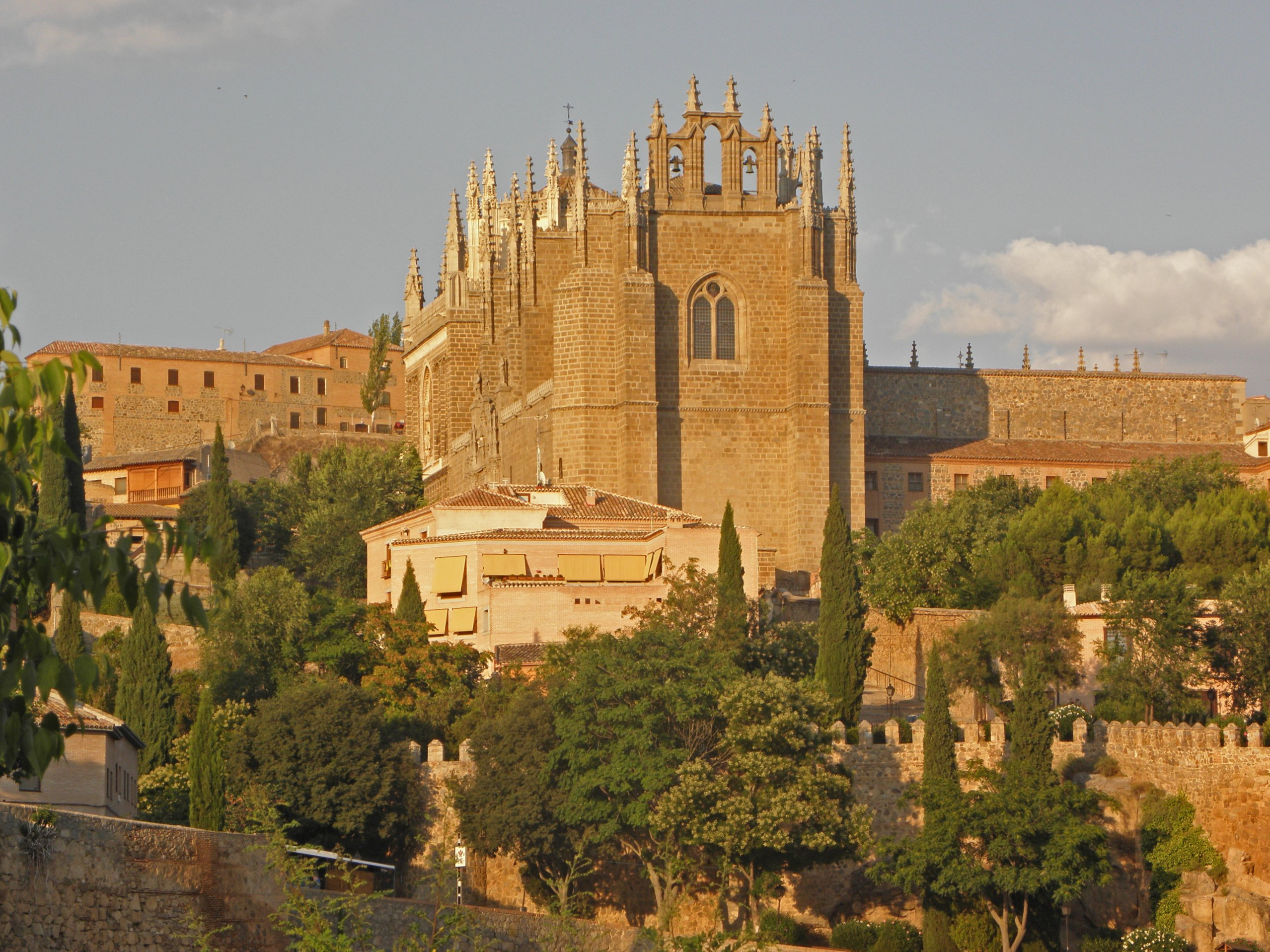
Church exterior

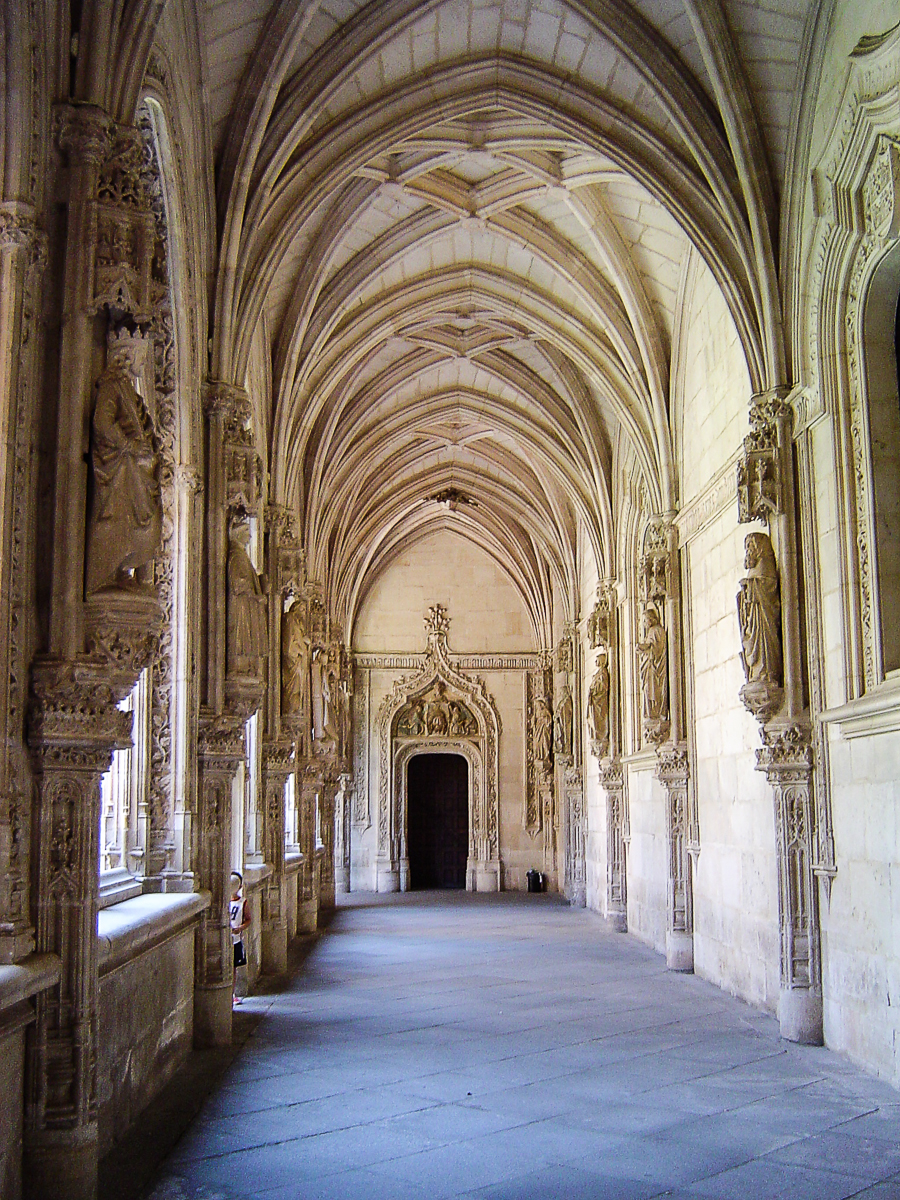
Lower cloister

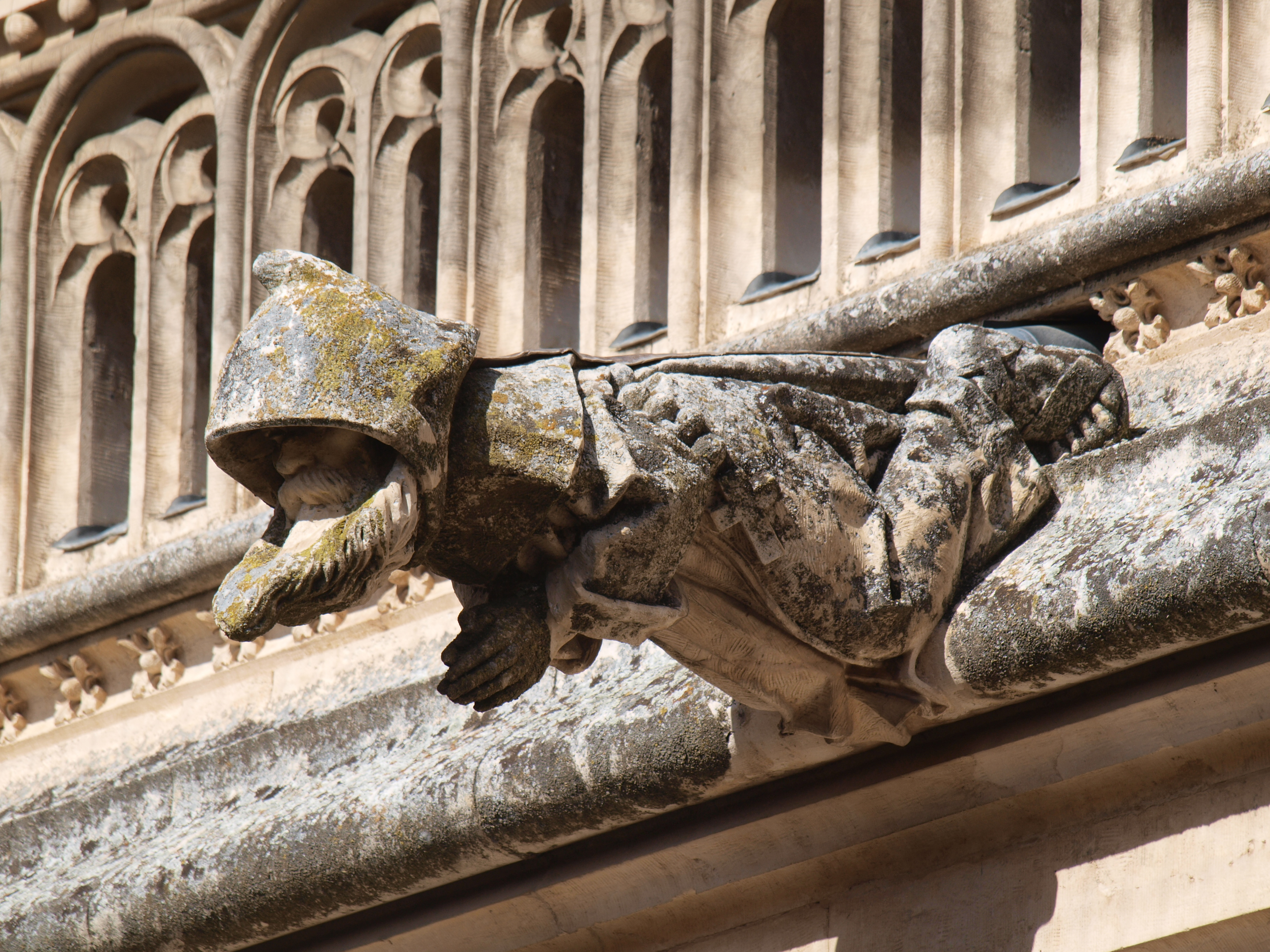
Gargoyles in the cloister
