= Hernando de Ávila =

Spanish painter

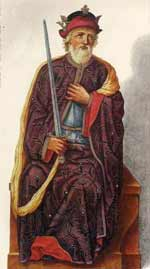
Alfonso II of Asturias, painting from 1594.

Hernando de Ávila (c.1538 – 1595), painter and sculptor to Philip II of Spain, flourished in the middle of the 16th century. He was a pupil of Francisco Comontes. He executed, in 1568, an altar-piece of 'St. John the Baptist,' and the 'Adoration of the Kings,' for the cathedral of Toledo.

Philip II of Spain would order to him of pictures of the book Libro de Retratos de Reyes..., signboards and real standards of the kings of Oviedo, Leon and Castile, possibly his last work and unique remaining testimony of the decoration of the hall, destroyed in 1860 by derrumbre of his ceiling. Conserved in the Museum of the Prado, he consists of 77 folios in paper verjurado with pictures of the kings of Oviedo, Leon and Castile, shields of arms, signboards and a genealogical tree. Dead Hernando de Ávila in Madrid in buried March 1595 and in the parish of San Sebastián, its widow received in April 1596 five hundred duchies by this book “illuminated of colors” and other, lost, of only drawings of the same subject.
