= Church of Saint Jerome the Royal =

Roman Catholic church in Madrid, Spain

San Jerónimo el Real
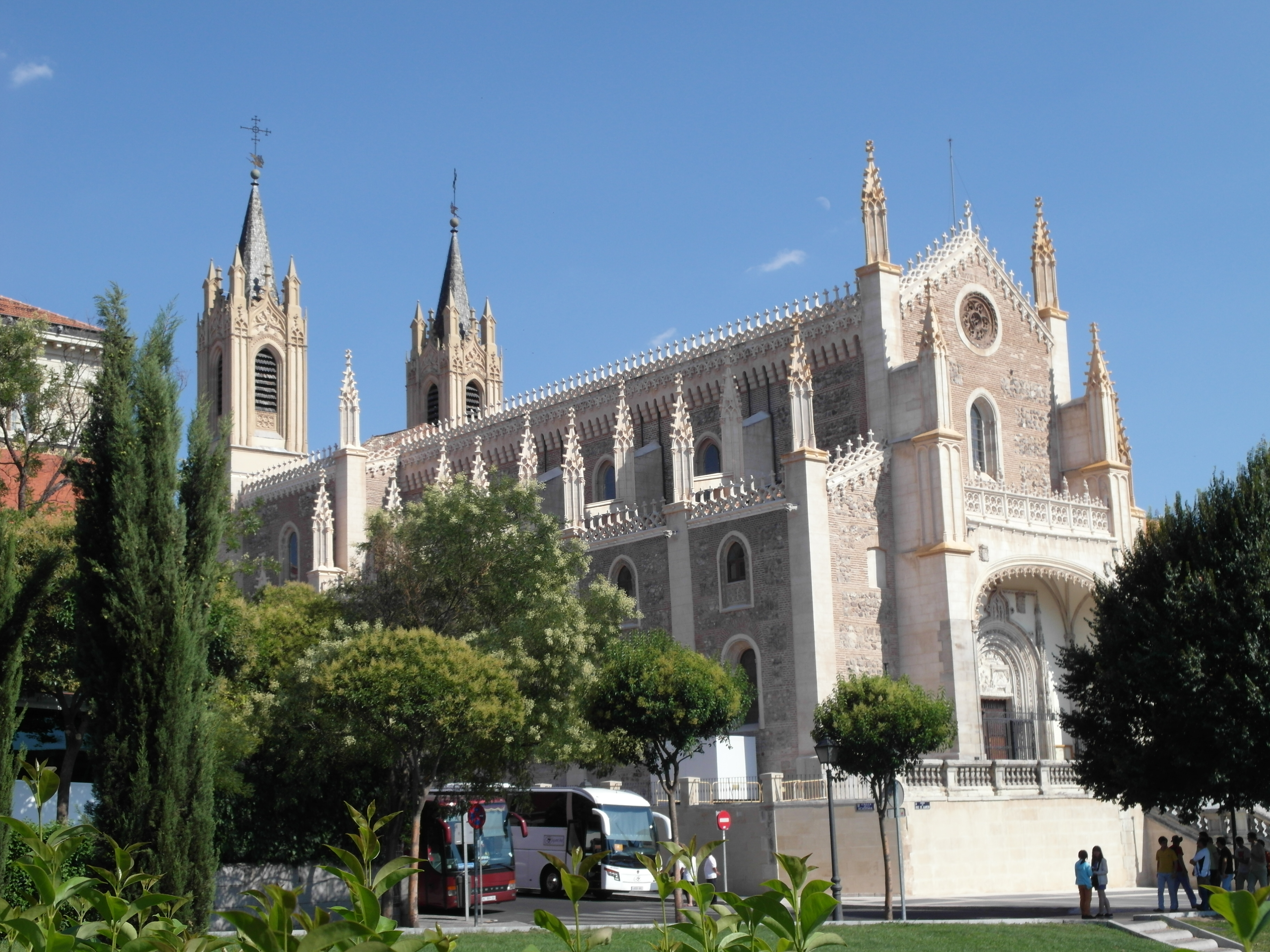
- View from the north angle

Religion
- Affiliation: Roman Catholic
- Diocese: Retiro
- Region: Community of Madrid
- Ecclesiastical or organisational status: Parish church
- Status: Active

Location
- Municipality: Madrid
- State: Spain
- Interactive map of San Jerónimo el Real
- Coordinates: 40.414514°N 3.691138°W

Architecture
- Architect: Enrique Egas
- Style: Isabelline Gothic
- Groundbreaking: 1503
- Completed: 1505
- Direction of façade: East
- Designated as NHL: 1925

Website
- www.parroquiasanjeronimoelreal.es

Saint Jerome the Royal (Spanish: San Jerónimo el Real) is a Roman Catholic church from the early 16th-century in central Madrid, Spain.

The church, which has undergone numerous remodelings and restorations over the centuries is the remaining structure of the Hieronymite monastery that once stood beside the royal palace of Buen Retiro, of which a portion now serves as the Prado museum. Its proximity to the royal palace also underscores a connection to royalty, serving for centuries as the church used for the investiture of the Prince of Asturias. In addition, a Mass to celebrate the investiture of King Juan Carlos I was held here. In part, this link was cemented also because Madrid only completed its Cathedral of the Almudena in 1993. For many centuries, the Church of San Isidro served as a de facto cathedral, but while this church was associated with the patron saint of Madrid, St. Isidore was also the patron of manual laborers, not royalty, thereby relegating the role of royal chapel to this church.

== History ==
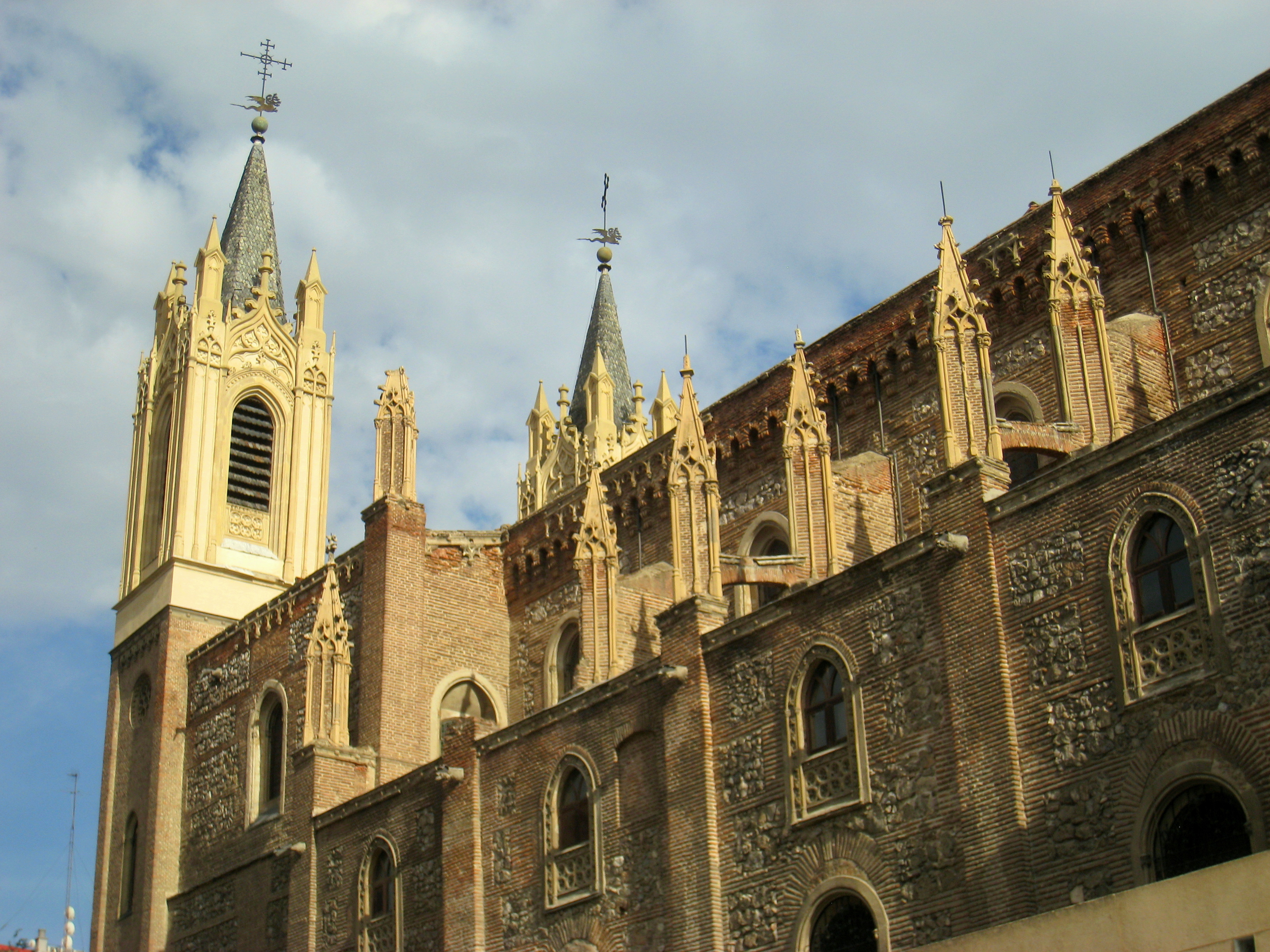
Lateral view

The original Hieronymites monastery, the Monasterio de Santa María del Paso, had been built near the Monte de El Pardo, on the banks of the river Manzanares, during the reign of Henry IV of Castile. However, due to the marshiness of the site, which caused much sickness among the monks, in 1502 Isabella I granted the monks land on which to build a new monastery, which was built in Isabelline Gothic style. The church was chosen for the investiture of the Princes of Asturias and future king Philip II on April 18, 1528.

When King Philip II moved the Spanish court to Madrid in 1561, he had his retreat enlarged to become the Palacio del Buen Retiro. He established a royal bedroom against the presbytery, such that he could hear mass from his bedroom. The Palacio del Buen Retiro was largely destroyed in the Napoleonic French occupation of Madrid. In 1808 the monks were expelled from the monastery and French troops were quartered in the monastery, causing major damage to the building, and the church was almost left in ruins.

== Restoration ==
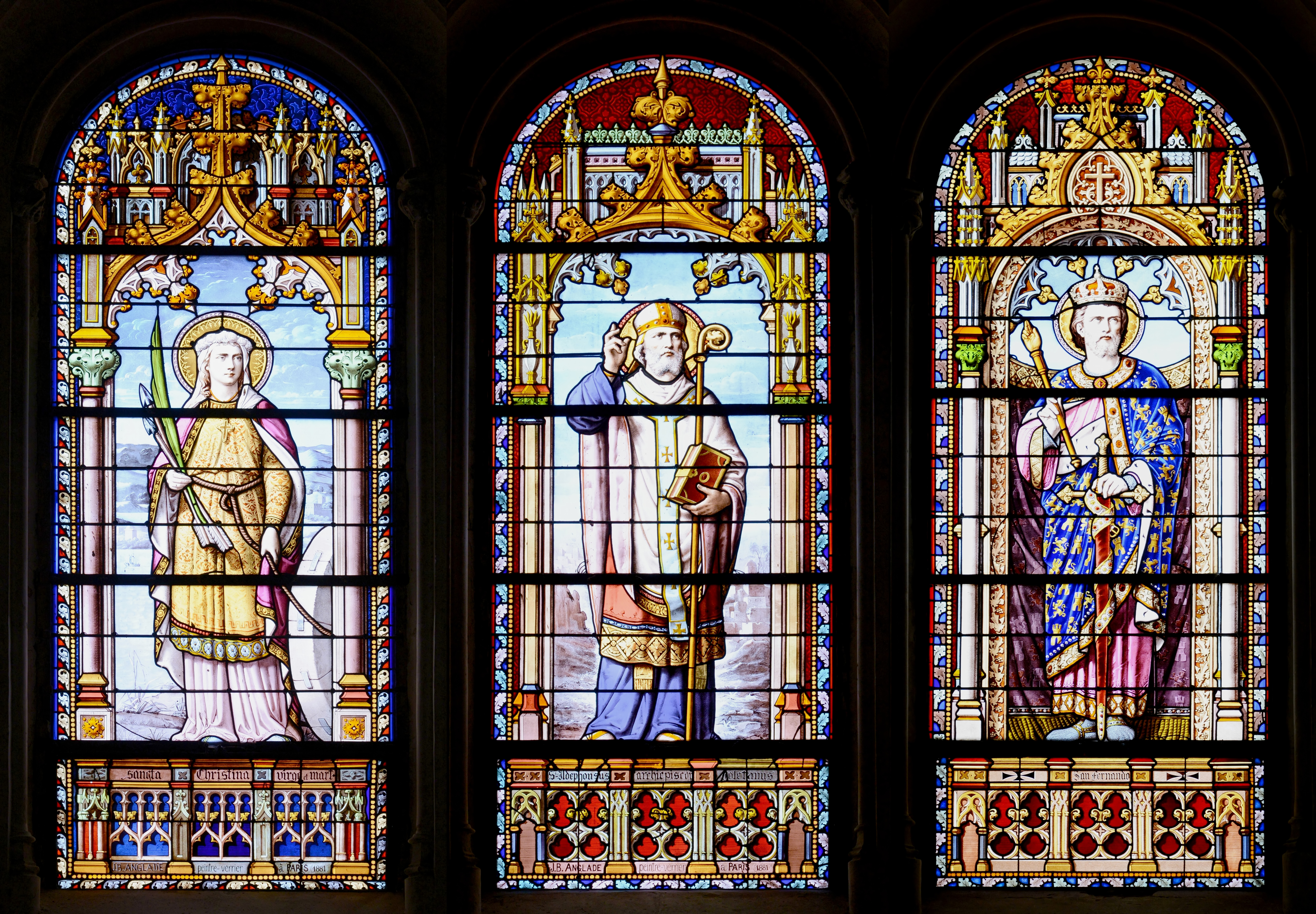
Three stained-glass windows by the French artist J. P. Anglade, Paris, 1881

The first major restoration was carried out during the reign of Isabel II of Spain, between 1848 and 1859, by the architect Narciso Pascual Colomer, in the Isabelline Gothic style, who added some new elements, such as towers. The second restoration, 1879 to 1883, by Enrique María Repullés, transformed the building into its current role as a parish church. Only a few external features remain of its original structure. The exterior remodeling of the nineteenth century in a neo-Gothic style by Pontian Ponzano remains controversial.

The stairway that faces the street was constructed in 1906 on the occasion of the wedding of King Alfonso XIII to provide more impressive access to the church. For many decades, the Baroque cloister, designed by Lorenzo de San Nicolás, remained in disrepair. Finally, in 2007, an agreement between the church and the government led to the appropriation of the land for the cloister by the Prado Museum. The inner courtyard facade was dismantled, and then rebuilt as a cubic room, designed by Rafael Moneo in an expansion of the museum. The wing has been labeled the Cubo de Moneo, (Moneo's Cube).

== Interior ==
The church contains sculptures by Mariano Benlliure Gill, Juan Pascual de Mena’s 18th-century Cristo de la Buena Muerte, and paintings by Vincenzo Carducci and José Méndez, neo-Gothic lamps and stained-glass windows.

== Gallery ==
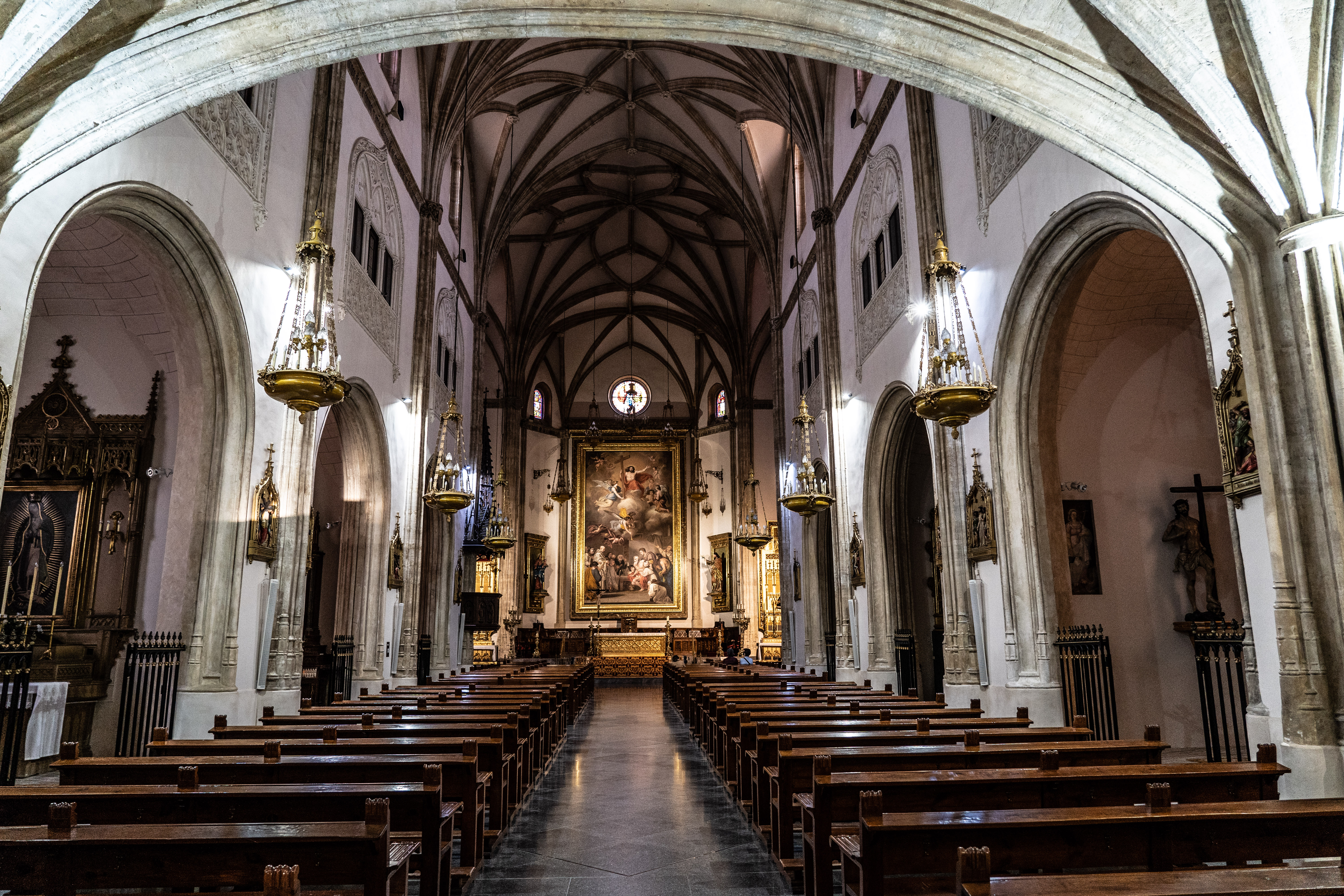
Interior

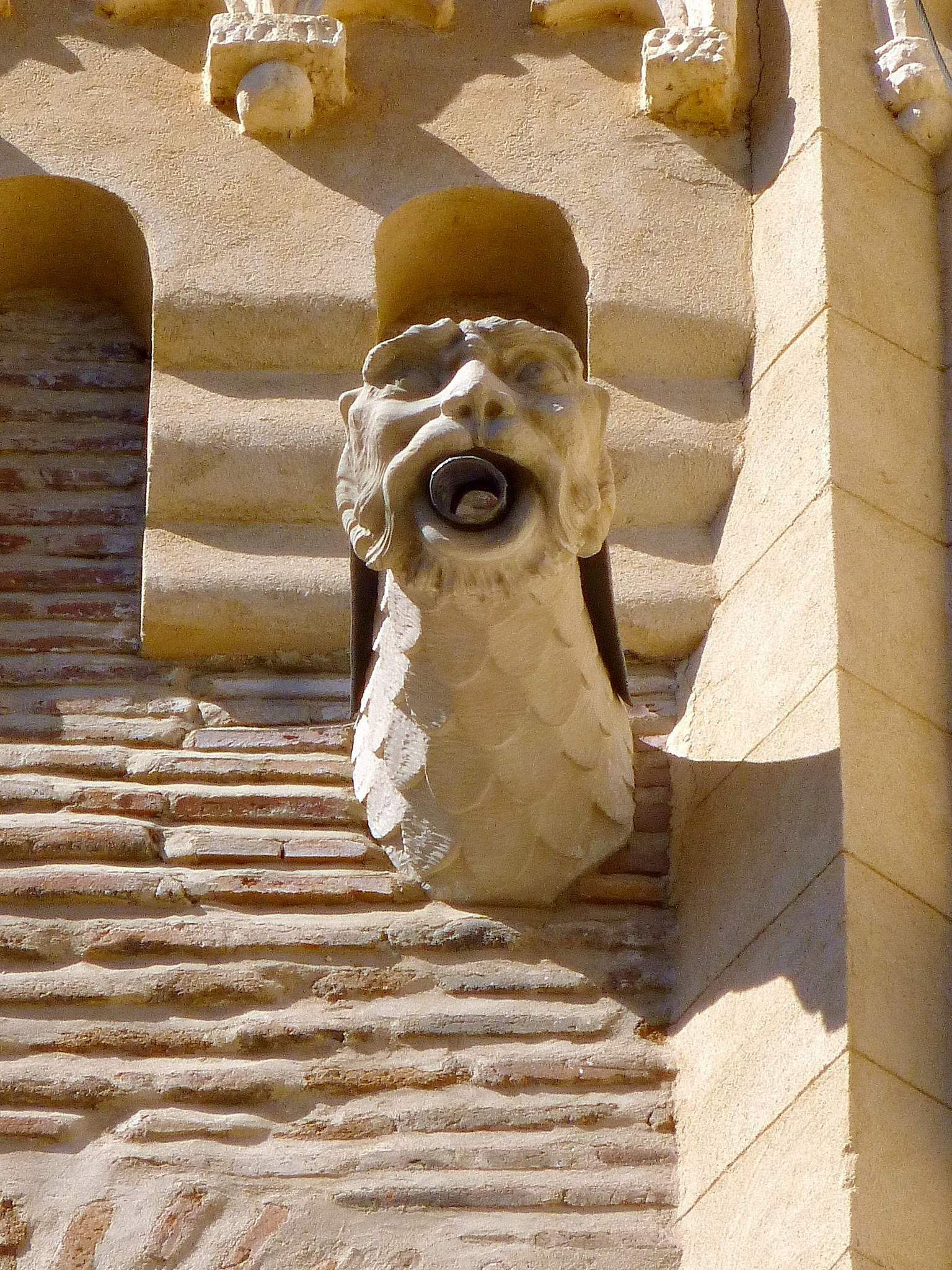
Head of gargoyle

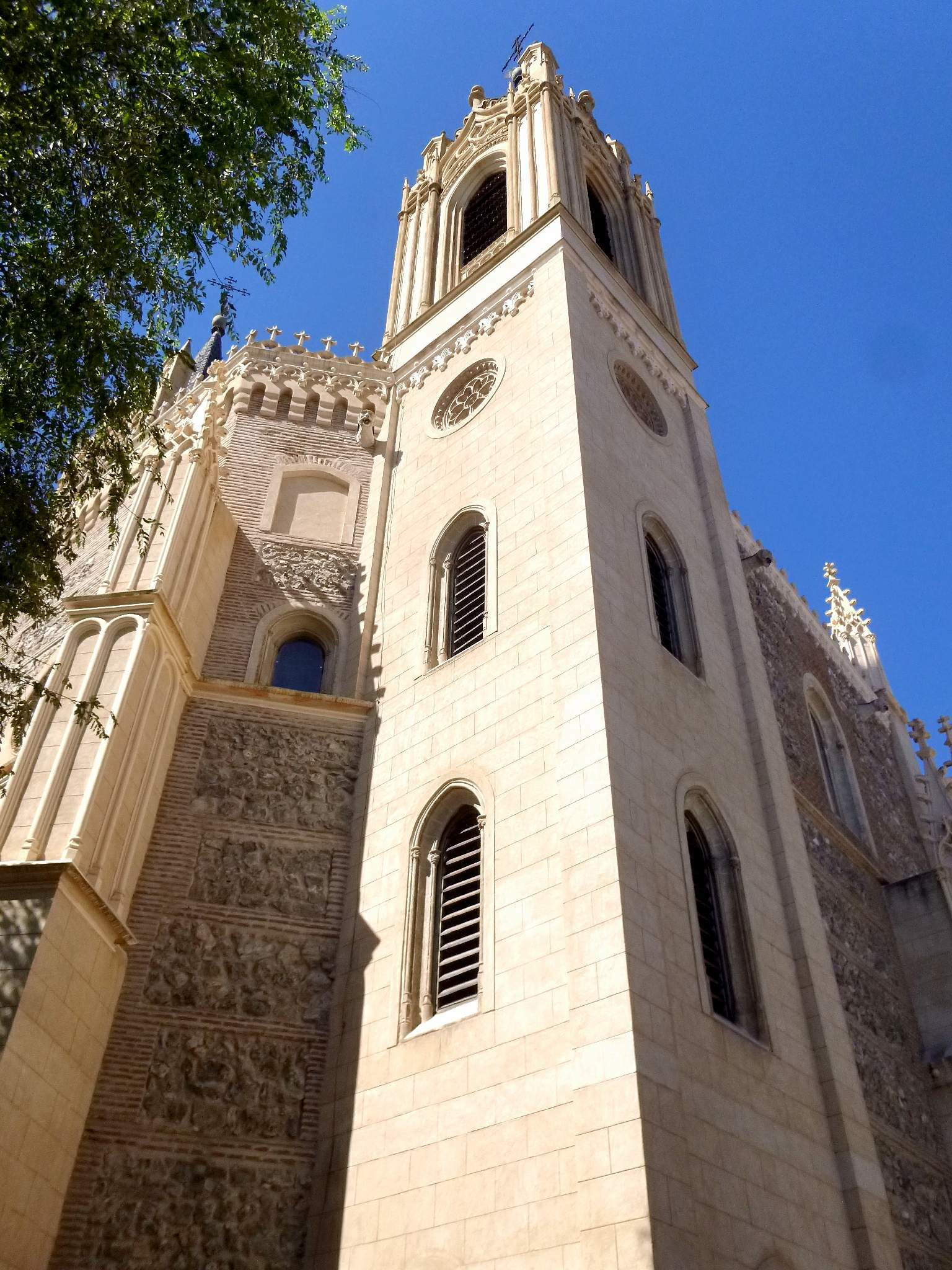
Detail of east facade.

== See also ==
- Catholic Church in Spain
- List of oldest church buildings
