= Isabelline (architectural style) =

Architectural style in Spain (1470s-1520s)

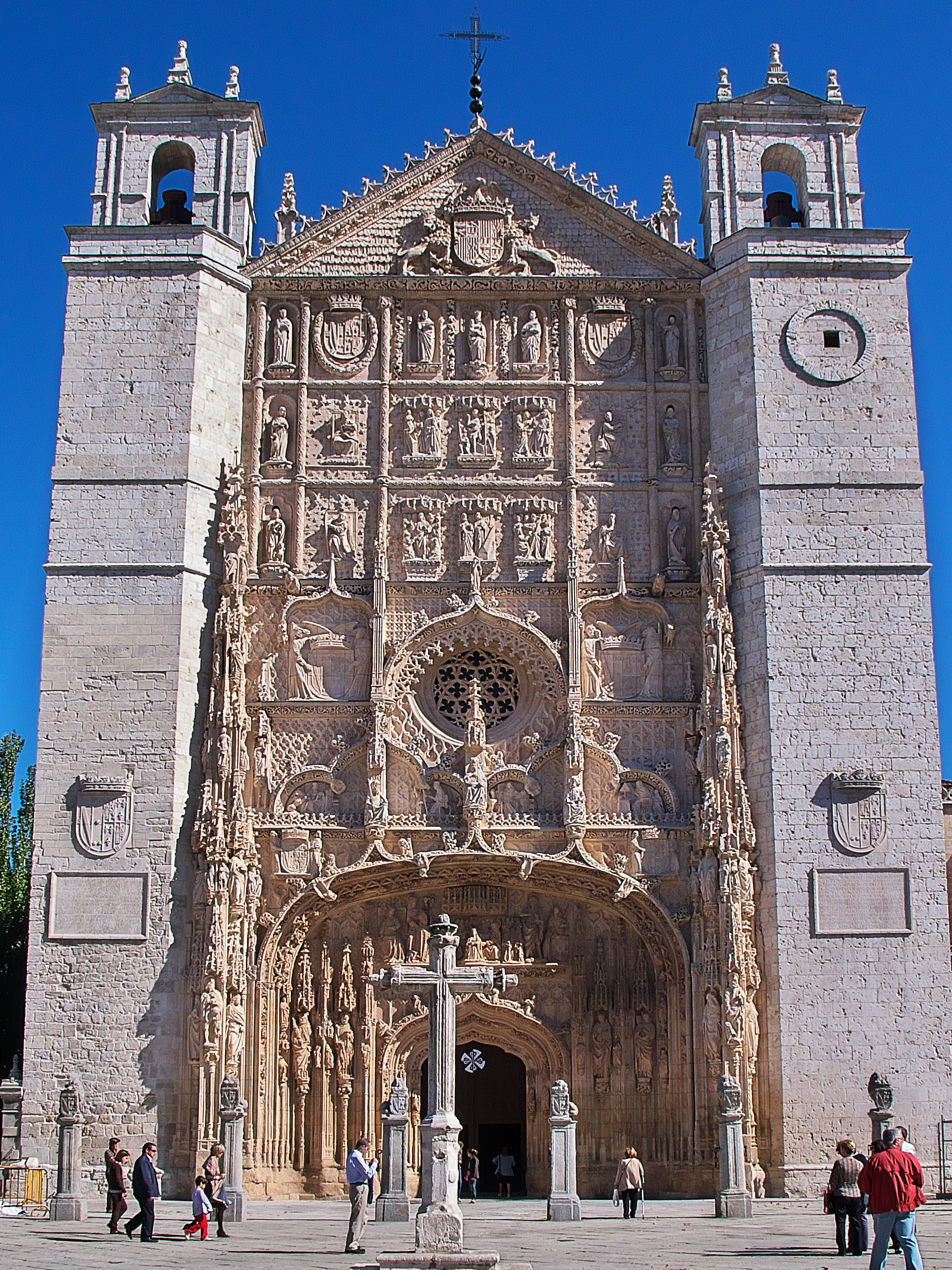
Facade of Iglesia conventual de San Pablo, Valladolid.

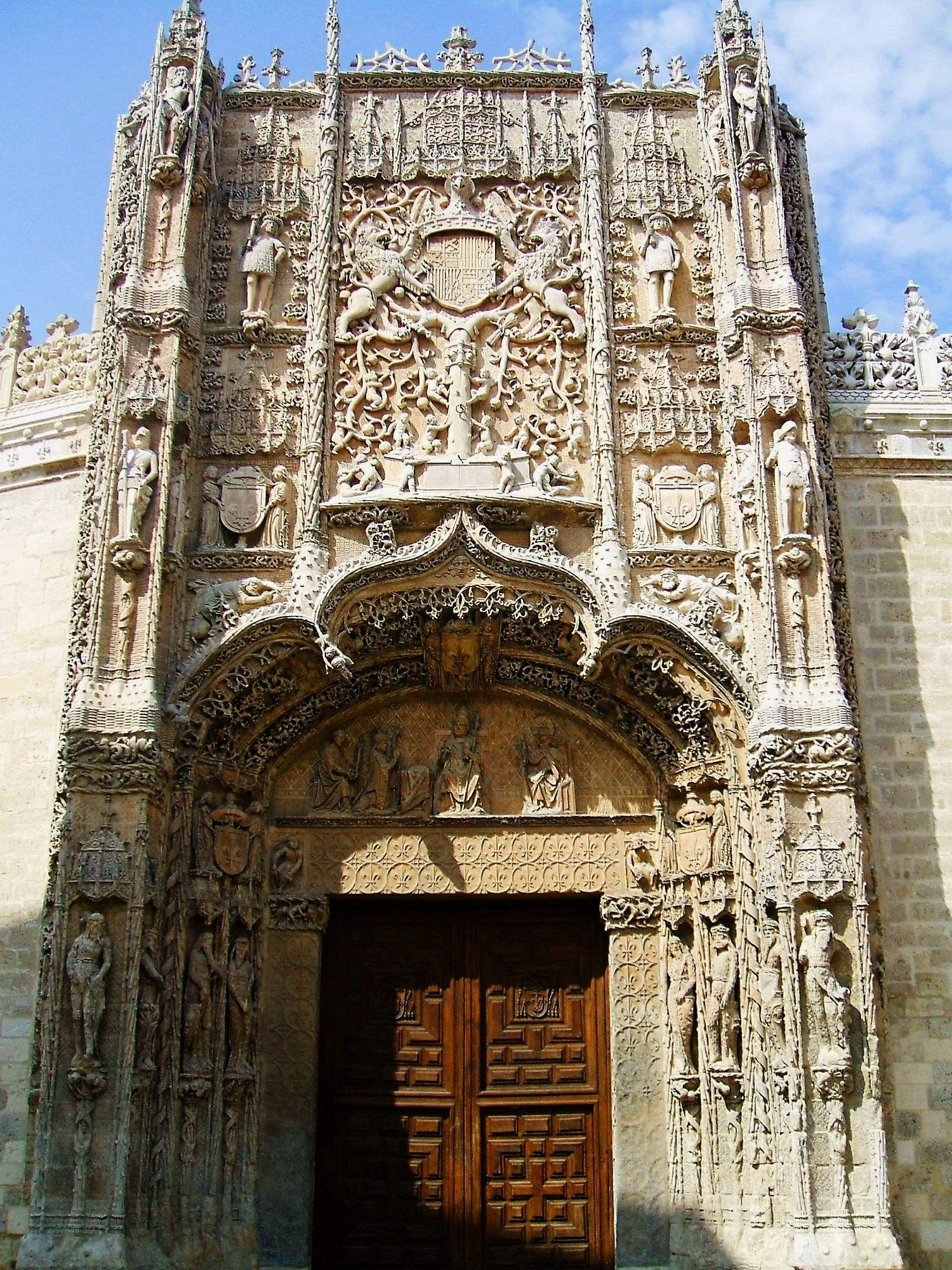
Facade of the Colegio de San Gregorio, Valladolid

The Isabelline style, also called the Isabelline Gothic (Spanish: Gótico Isabelino), or Castilian late Gothic, was the dominant architectural style of the Crown of Castile during the reign of the Catholic Monarchs, Queen Isabella I of Castile and King Ferdinand II of Aragon in the late-15th century to early-16th century. The Frenchman Émile Bertaux named the style after Queen Isabella.

It represents the transition between late Gothic and early Renaissance architecture, with original features and decorative influences of the Castilian tradition, the Flemish, the Mudéjar, and to a much lesser extent, Italian architecture. The consideration or not of the Isabelline as a Gothic or Renaissance style, or as an Eclectic style, or as a phase within a greater Plateresque generic, is a question debated by historians of art and unresolved.

== Overview ==
The Isabelline style introduced several structural elements of the Castilian tradition and the typical flamboyant forms of Flanders, as well as some ornaments of Mudéjar influence. Many of the buildings that were built in this style were commissioned by the Catholic Monarchs or were in some way sponsored by them. A similar style called Manueline developed concurrently in Portugal. The most obvious characteristic of the Isabelline is the predominance of heraldic and epigraphic motifs, especially the symbols of the yoke and arrows and the pomegranate, which refer to the Catholic Monarchs. Also characteristic of this period is ornamentation using beaded motifs of orbs worked in plaster or carved in stone.

After the Catholic Monarchs had completed the Reconquista in 1492 and started the colonization of the Americas, imperial Spain began to develop a consciousness of its growing power and wealth, and in its exuberance launched a period of construction of grand monuments to symbolize them. Many of these monuments were built at the command of the Queen; thus Isabelline Gothic manifested the desire of the Spanish ruling classes to display their own power and wealth. This exuberance found a parallel expression in the extreme profusion of decoration which has been called Plateresque.

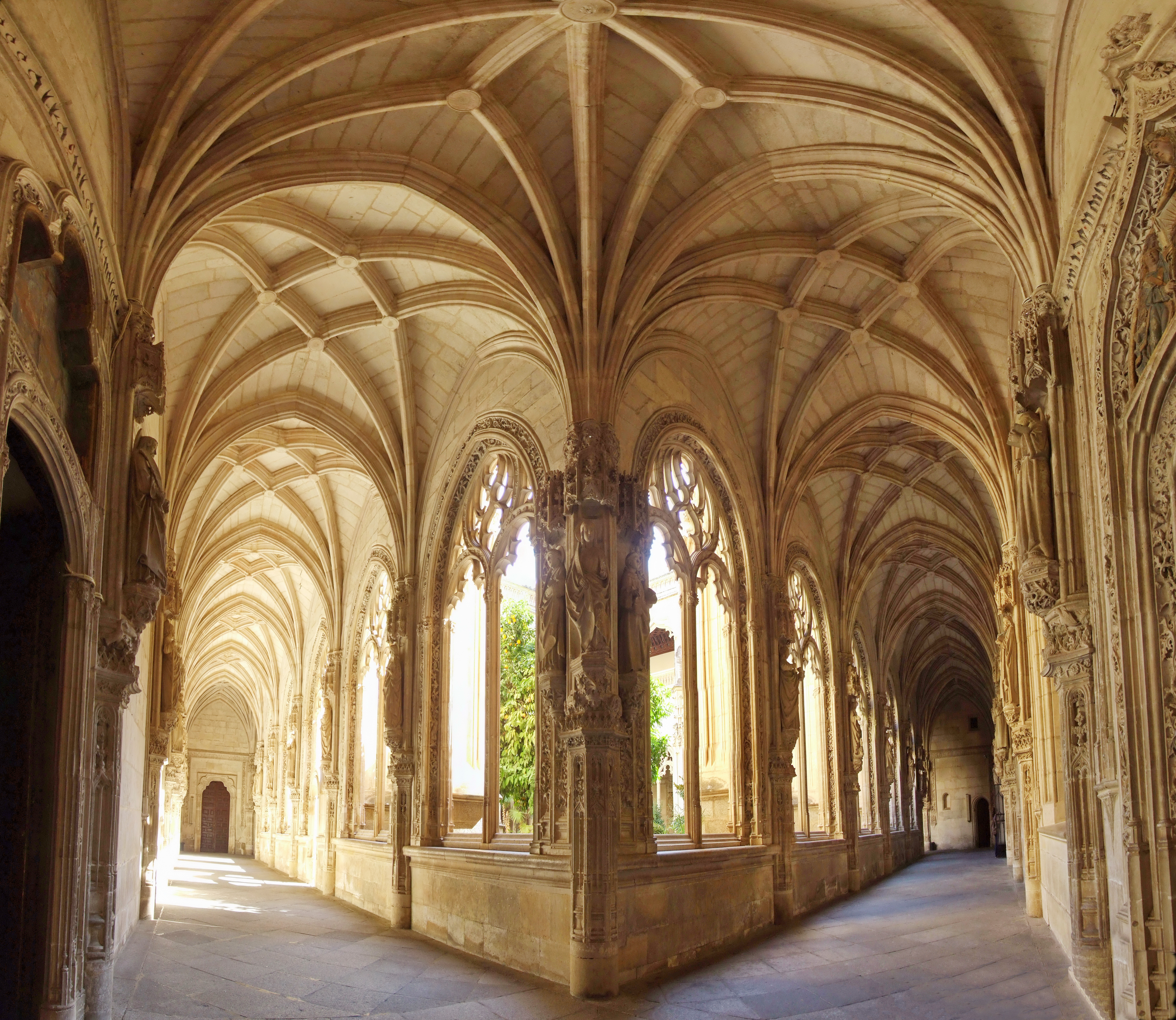
Lower cloister of the Monastery of San Juan de los Reyes, Toledo

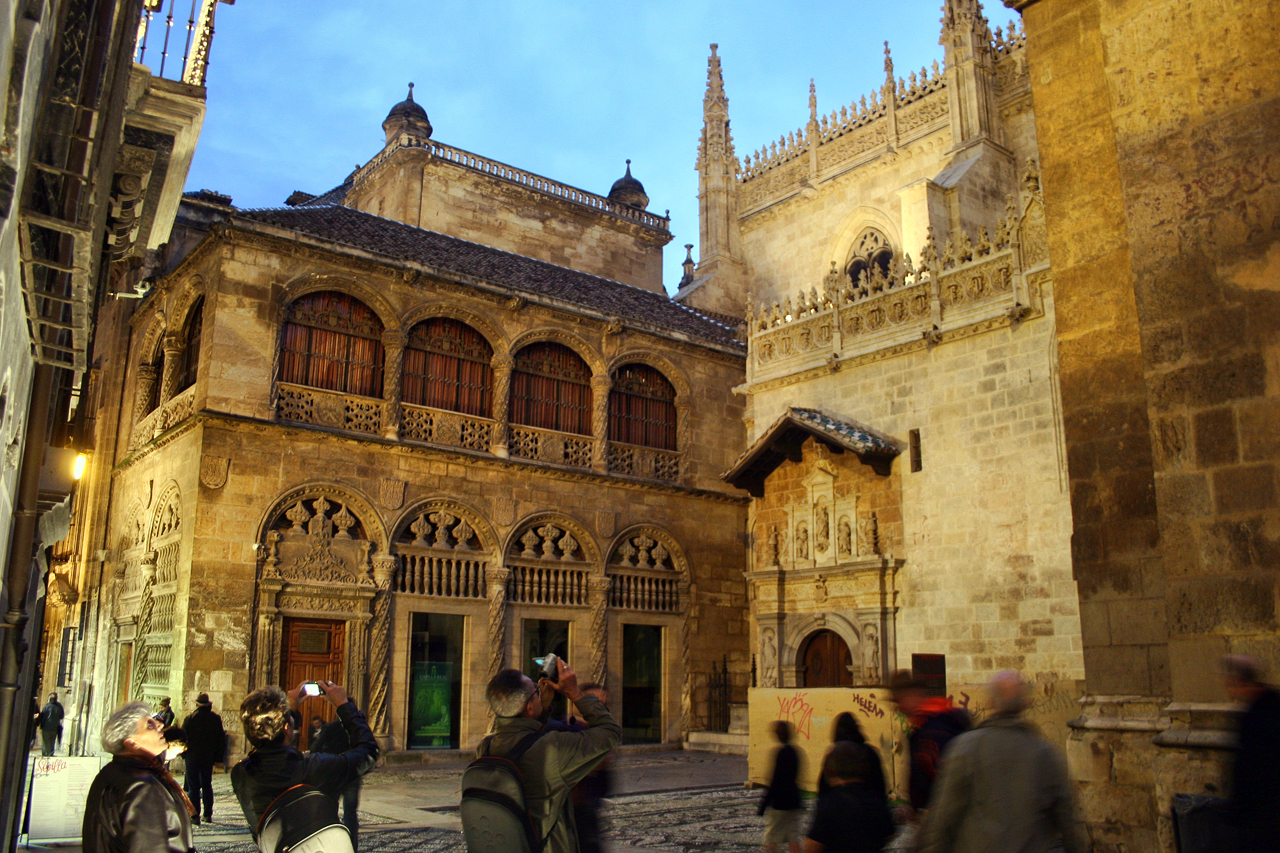
Royal Chapel of Granada

References to classical antiquity in the architecture of Spain were more literary, whereas in Italy, the prevalence of Roman-era buildings had given 'Gothic' a meaning adapted to Italian classicist taste. Until the Renaissance took hold in the Iberian peninsula, the transition from the 'Modern' to the 'Roman' in Spanish architecture had hardly begun. These terms were applied with a meaning different from what one would expect – the 'Modern', an originally Spanish style, referred to the Gothic and its rational efficiency, while the 'Roman' was the neoclassical or emotional and sensualist style of the Italian Renaissance architecture.

Regardless of the spatial characteristics of the interiors, Gothic buildings utilized proven structural systems. The Gothic style in the Iberian Peninsula had undergone a series of changes under the influence of local tradition, including much smaller windows, which allowed the construction of roofs with substantially less pitch. This made for a truly original style, yet more efficient construction. Spanish architects, accustomed to their Gothic structural conventions, looked with some contempt on the visible metal braces that Italian architects were forced to put on their buildings' arches to resist horizontal thrust, while their own Gothic building methods had avoided this problem.

The development of classical architecture in the Iberian Peninsula, as elsewhere, had been moribund during the centuries of building construction done in the Gothic tradition, and the neoclassical movement of the Italian Renaissance was late to arrive there. A unique style with modern elements evolved from the Gothic inheritance in Spain. Perhaps the best example of this syncretistic style is the Monastery of San Juan de los Reyes in Toledo; designed by the architect Juan Guas, its Gothic ideals are expressed more in the construction than in the design of the interior space, as the relationship with original French Gothic building techniques had receded with the passage of time.

In the Isabelline style, decorative elements of Italianate origin were combined with Iberian traditional elements to form ornamental complexes that overlaid the structures, while retaining many Gothic elements, such as pinnacles and pointed arches. Isabelline architects clung to the Gothic solution of the problem of how to distribute the weight burden of vaults pressing on pillars (not on the walls, as in the Romanesque or Italian Renaissance styles): that is, by propping them up with flying buttresses. After 1530, although the Isabelline style continued to be used and its decorative ornaments were still evolving, Spanish architecture began to incorporate Renaissance ideas of form and structure.

== Main architects ==
- Juan Guas
- Egas Cueman
- Enrique Egas
- Simón de Colonia

== List of notable Isabelline structures ==
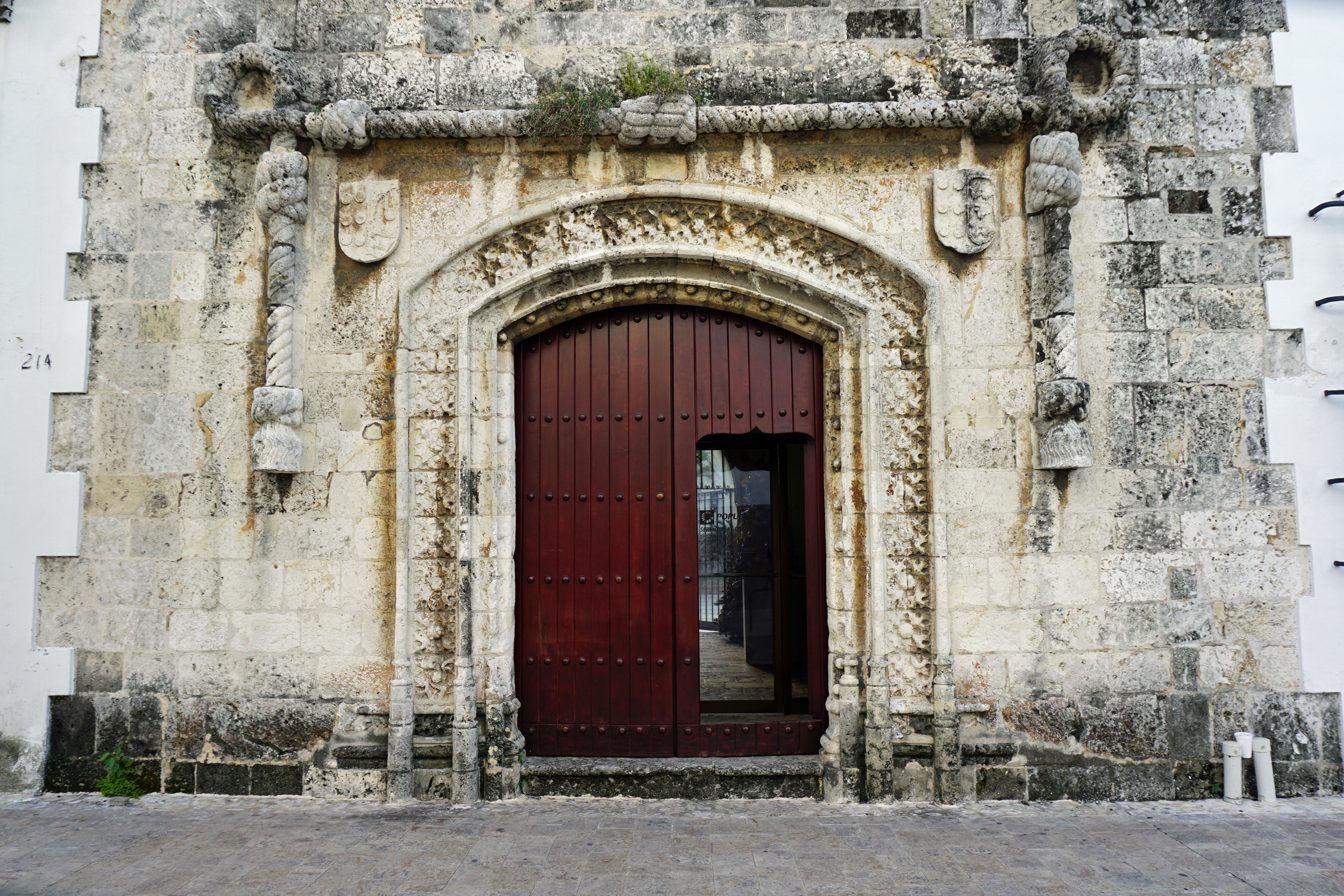
Casa del Cordón in Santo Domingo, Dominican Republic. It is the oldest European stone house in the Americas and probably the first European two-story house. It is an Isabelline-Gothic-style-house.

- Iglesia conventual de San Pablo in Valladolid
- Monastery of San Juan de los Reyes in Toledo
- Royal Chapel of Granada
- Iglesia de Santa María la Real in Aranda de Duero
- Colegio de San Gregorio in Valladolid
- Monastery of Santo Tomás in Ávila
- Miraflores Charterhouse in Burgos
- Palacio del Infantado in Guadalajara
- Facade of the Palacio de Jabalquinto in Baeza
- Monastery of San Jerónimo el Real in Madrid
- The defunct Abbey of Santa Engracia of Zaragoza
- Casa del Cordón in Santo Domingo, Dominican Republic
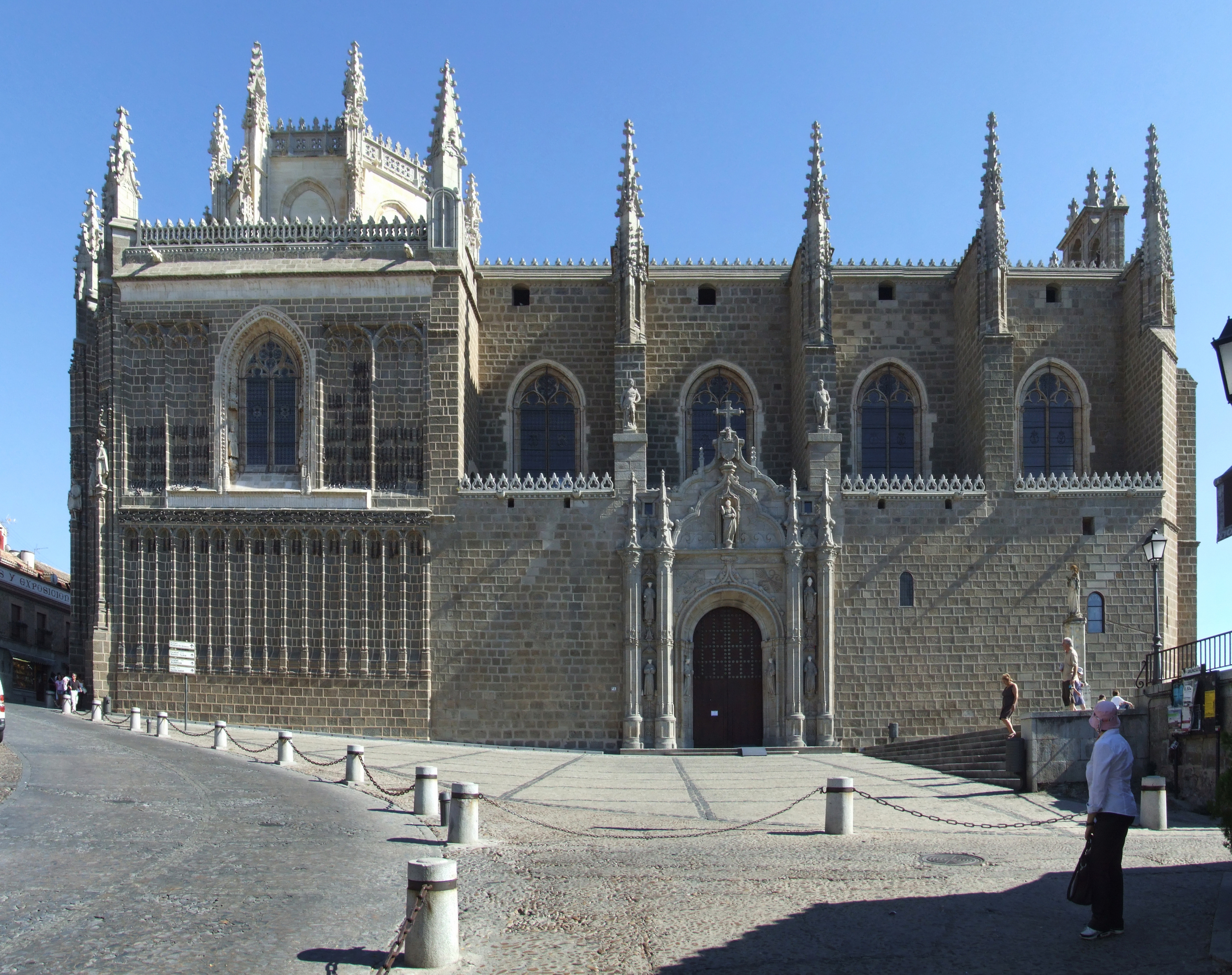
View of the Monastery of San Juan de los Reyes in Toledo.

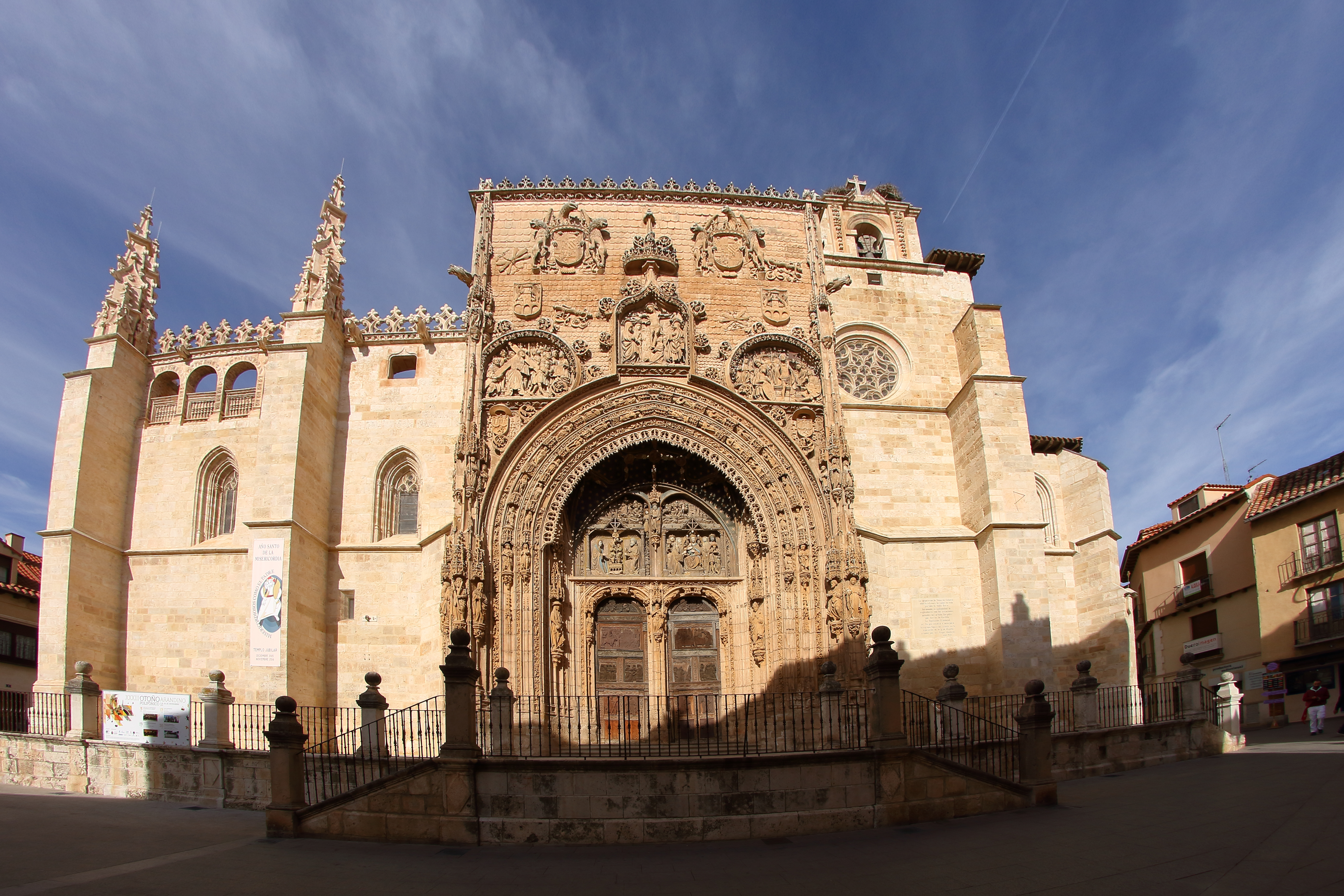
Facade of Iglesia de Santa María la Real in Aranda de Duero

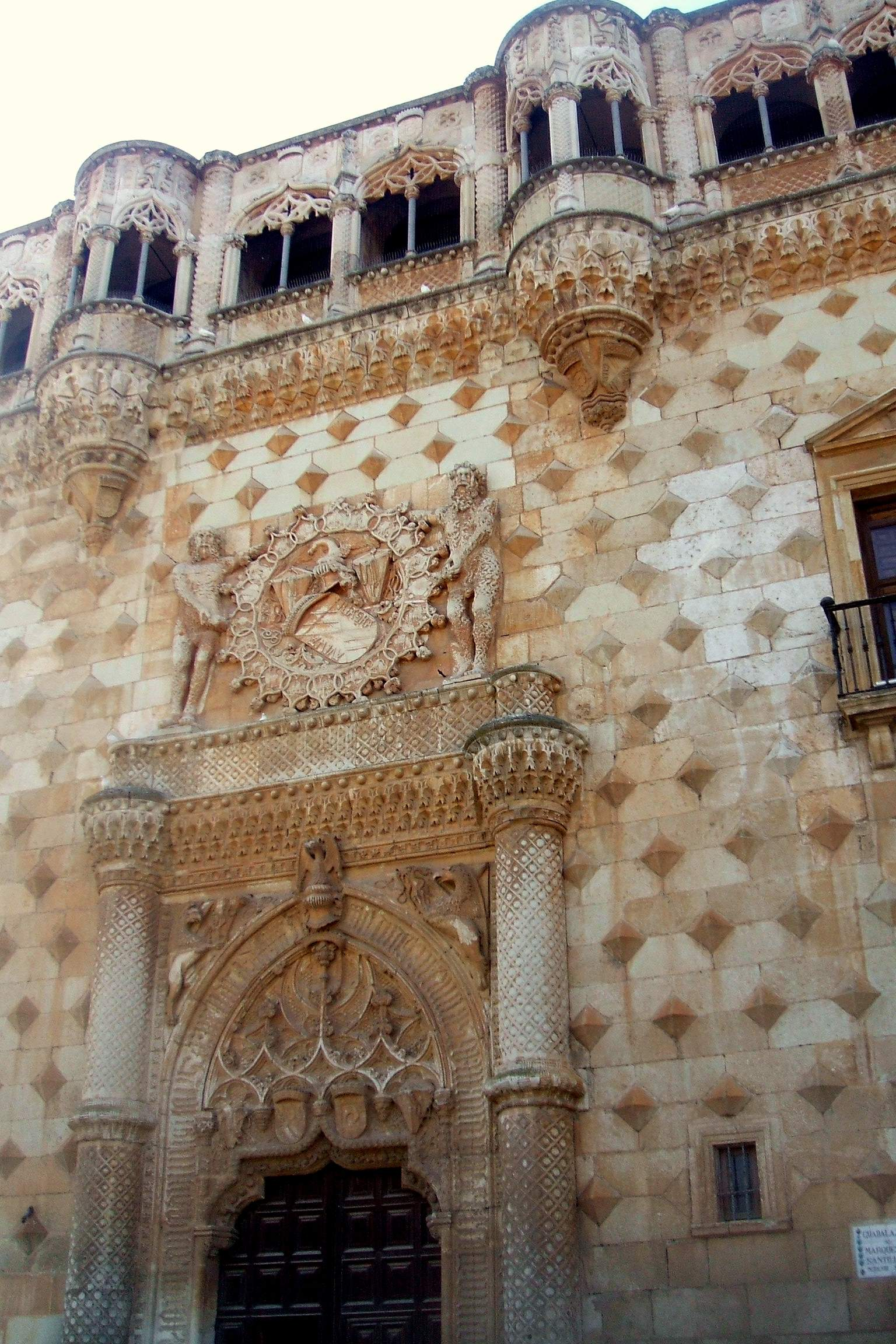
Palacio del Infantado in Guadalajara, Spain.

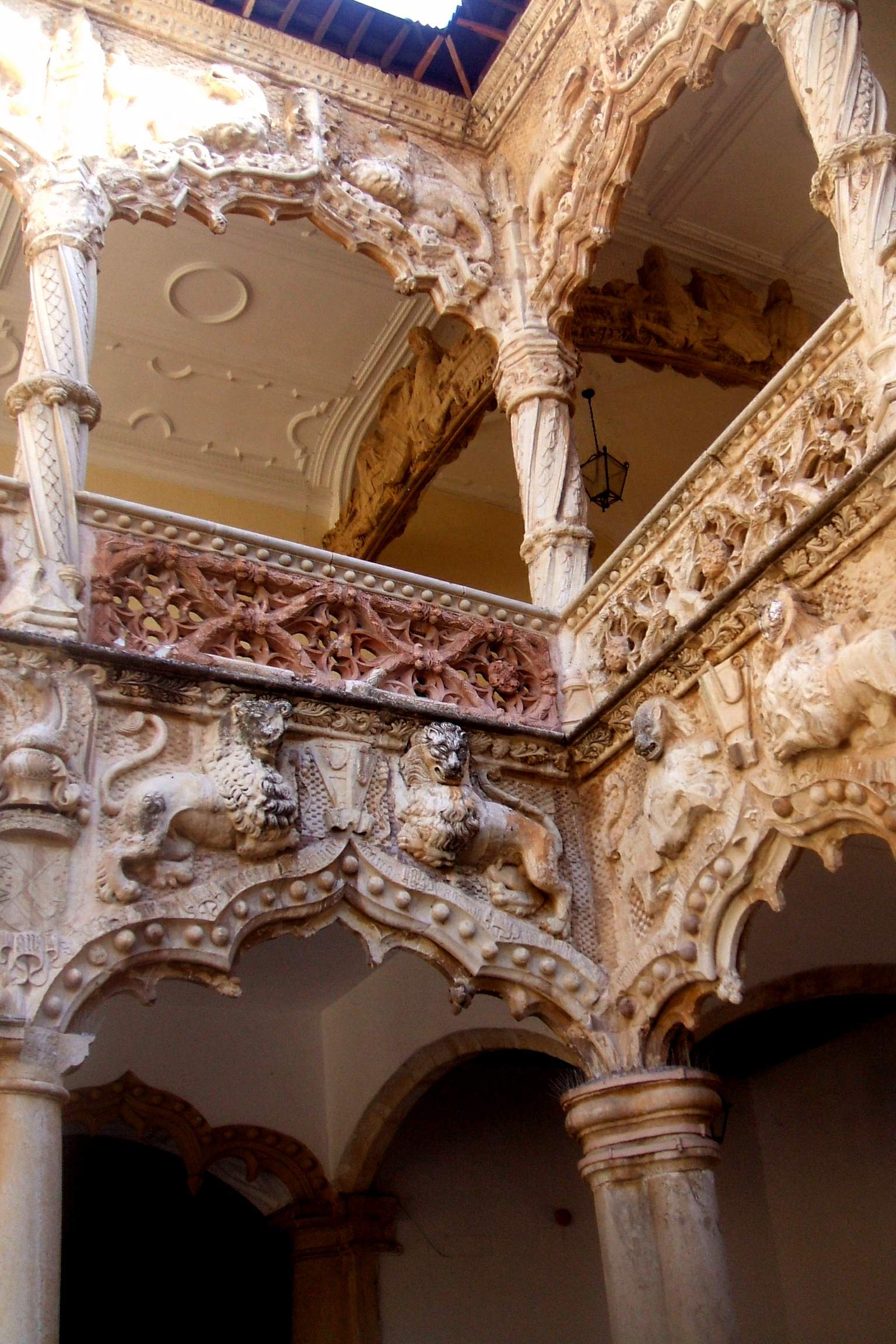
Courtyard of the Lions of the Palacio del Infantado in Guadalajara, Spain.

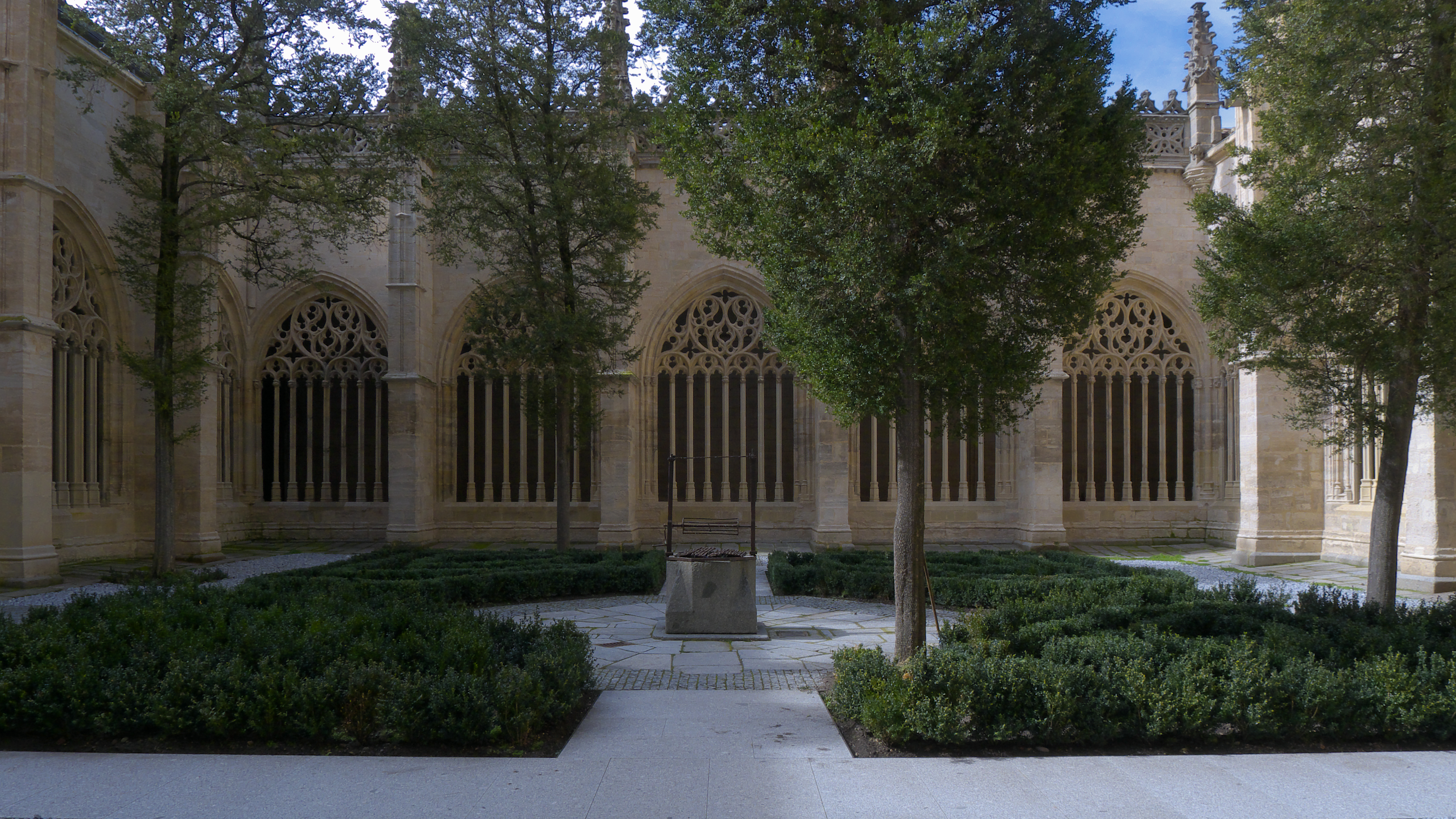
Cloister designed by Juan Guas in Segovia

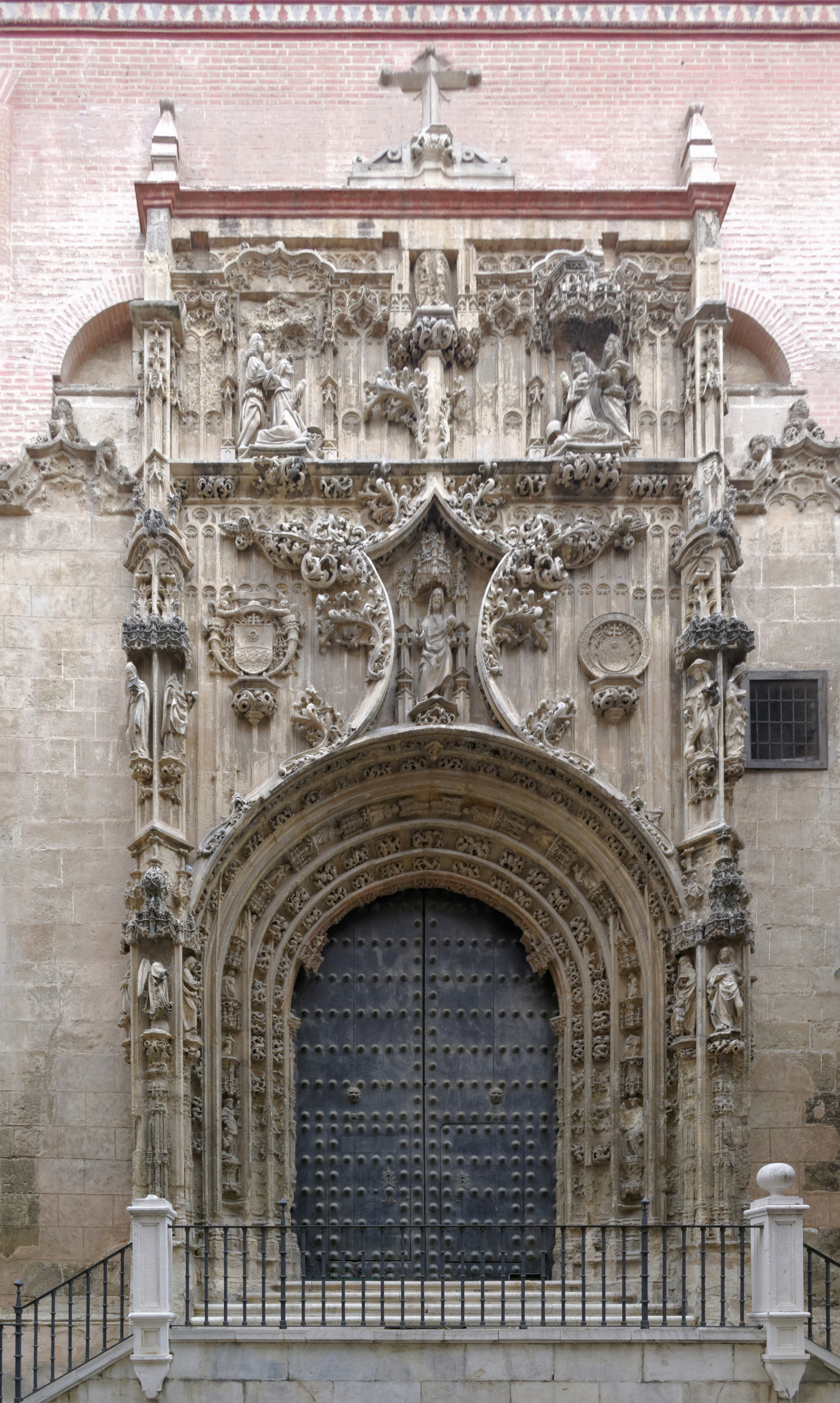
Iglesia del Sagrario in Málaga

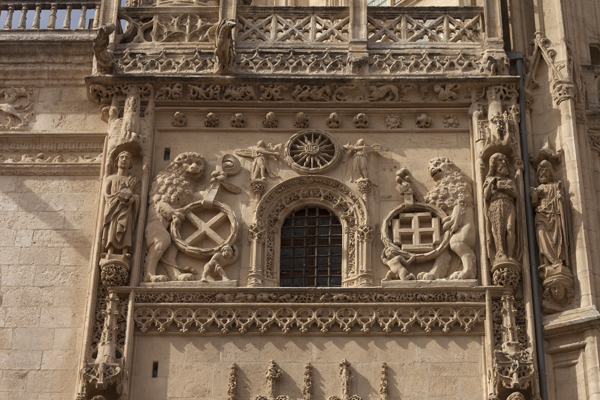
Detail of the Isabelline exterior decoration in the Constable's chapel of the Cathedral of Burgos.

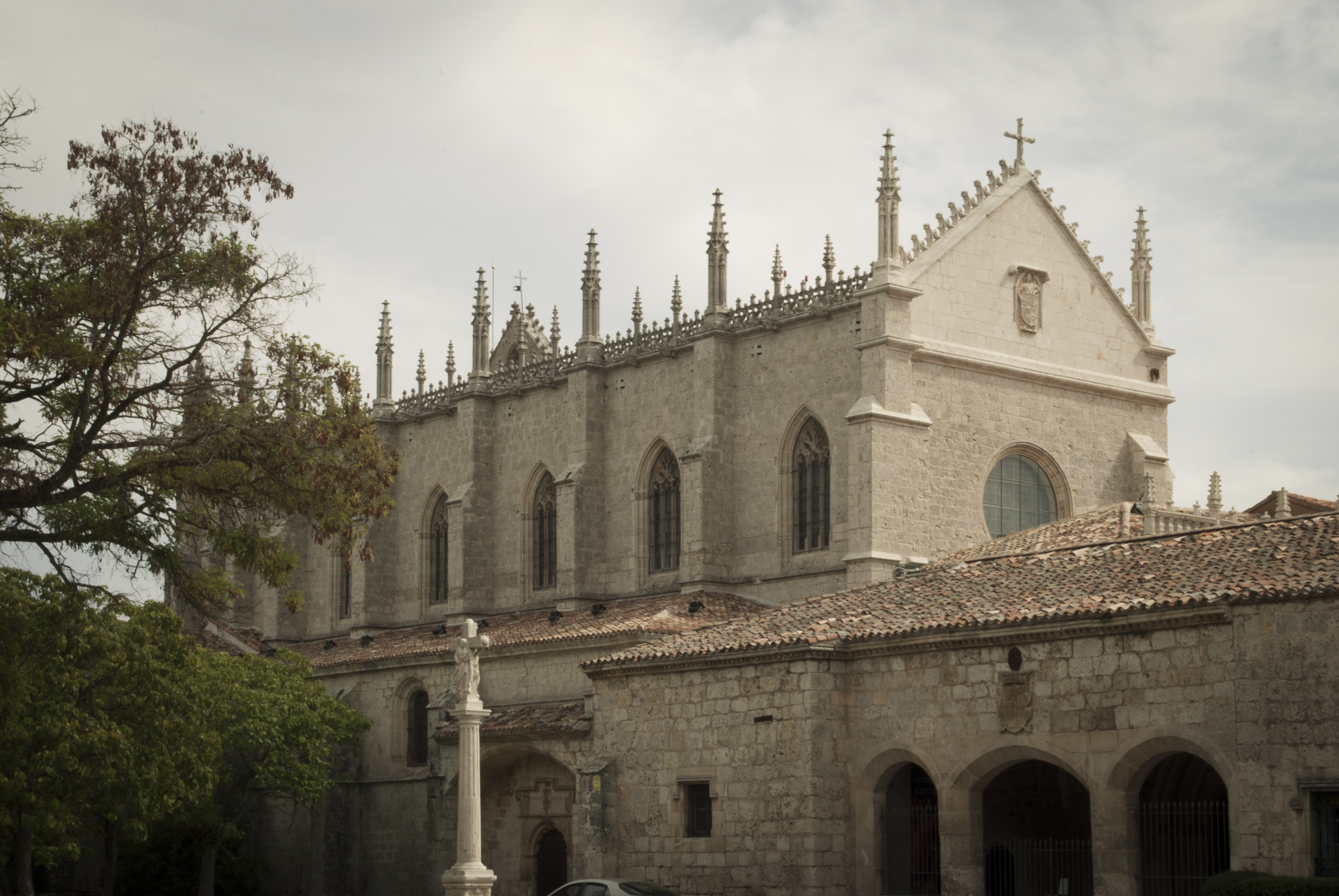
Miraflores Charterhouse in Burgos.

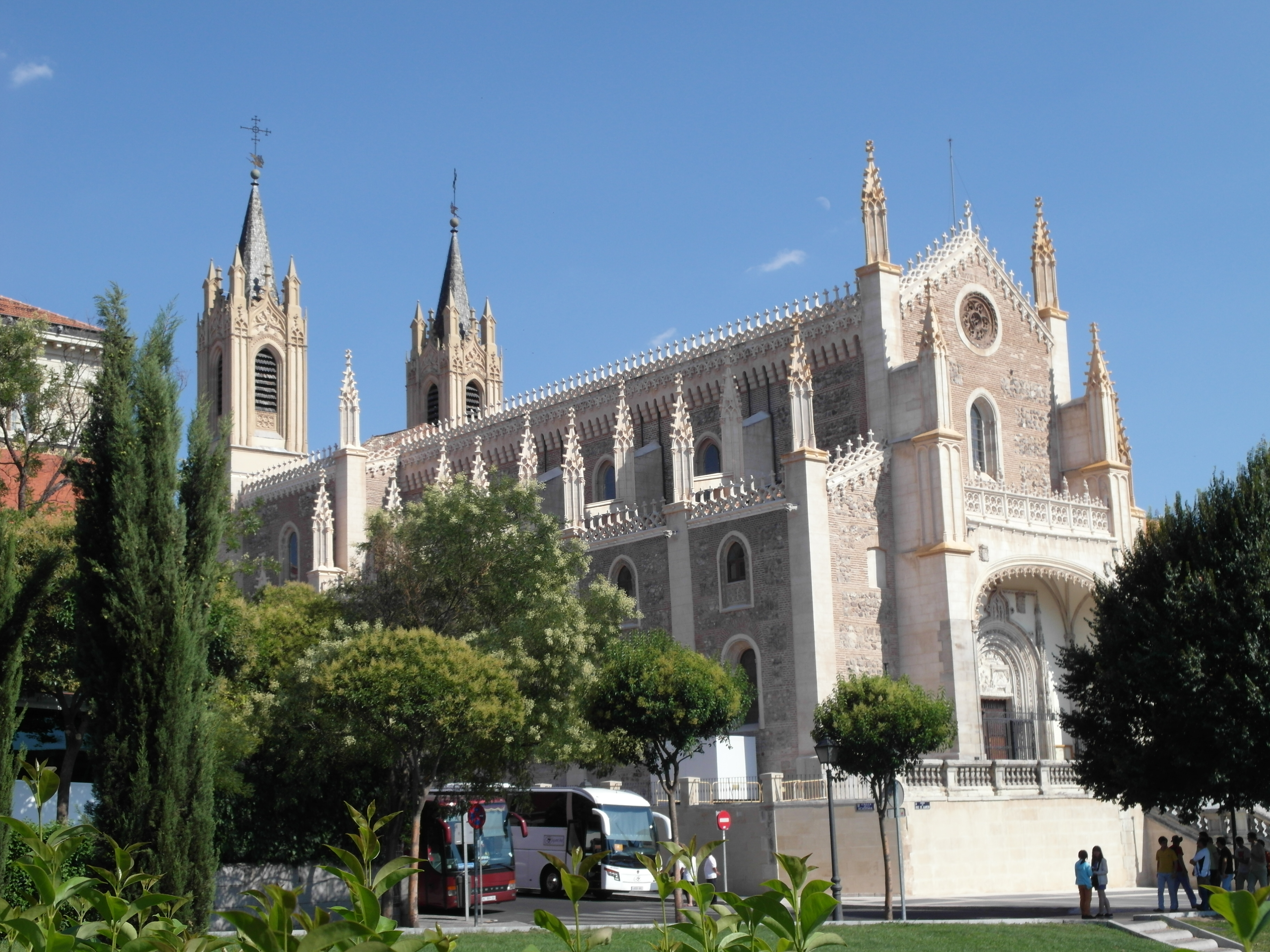
San Jerónimo el Real in Madrid

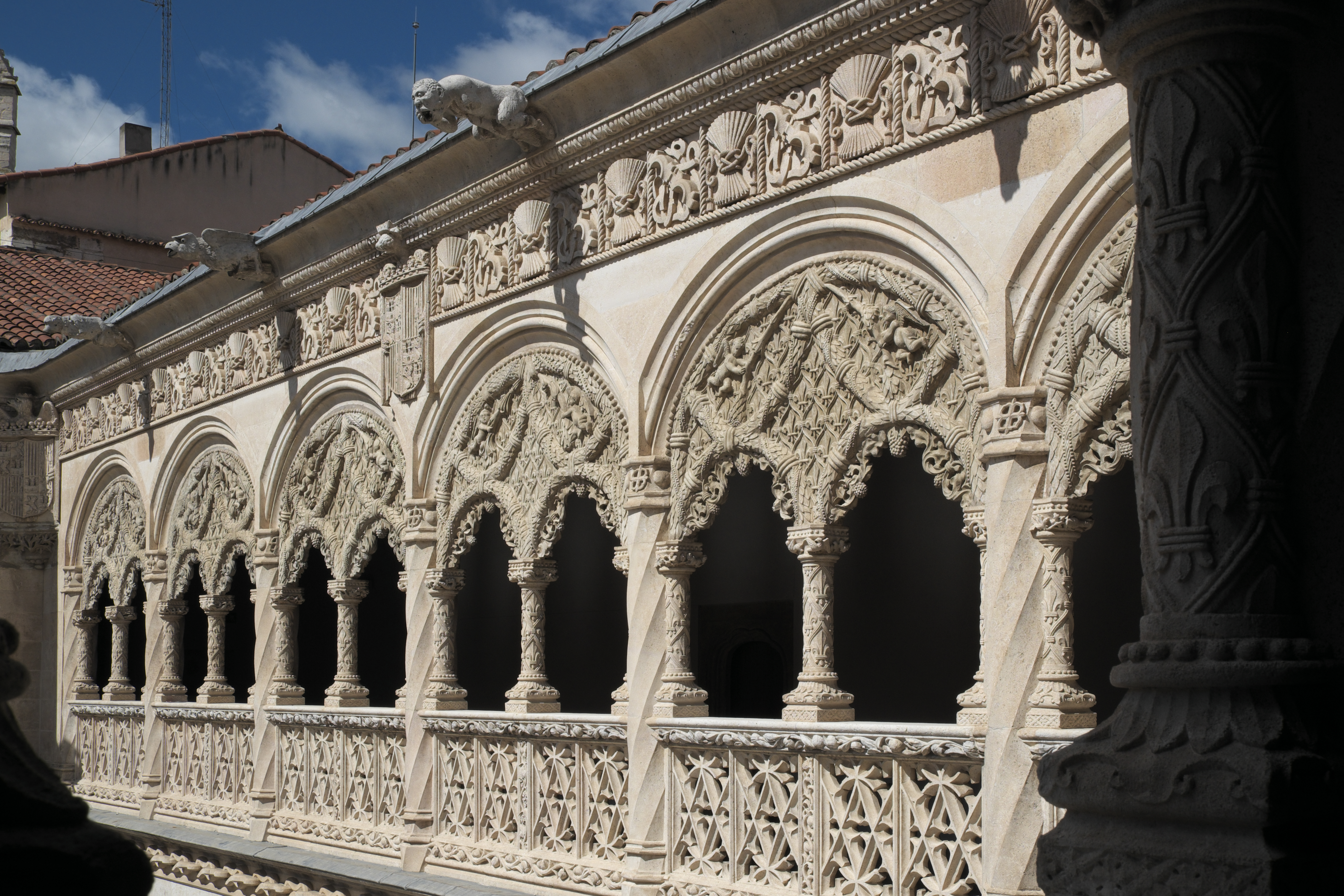
Patio Grande courtyard of the Colegio de San Gregorio in Valladolid

== See also ==
- Spanish Gothic architecture

== Notes and references ==
- Chueca Goitia, Fernando: Historia de la arquitectura española, two volumes. Diputación de Ávila, 2001. ISBN 84-923918-7-1
