= Francisco de Comontes =

Spanish painter

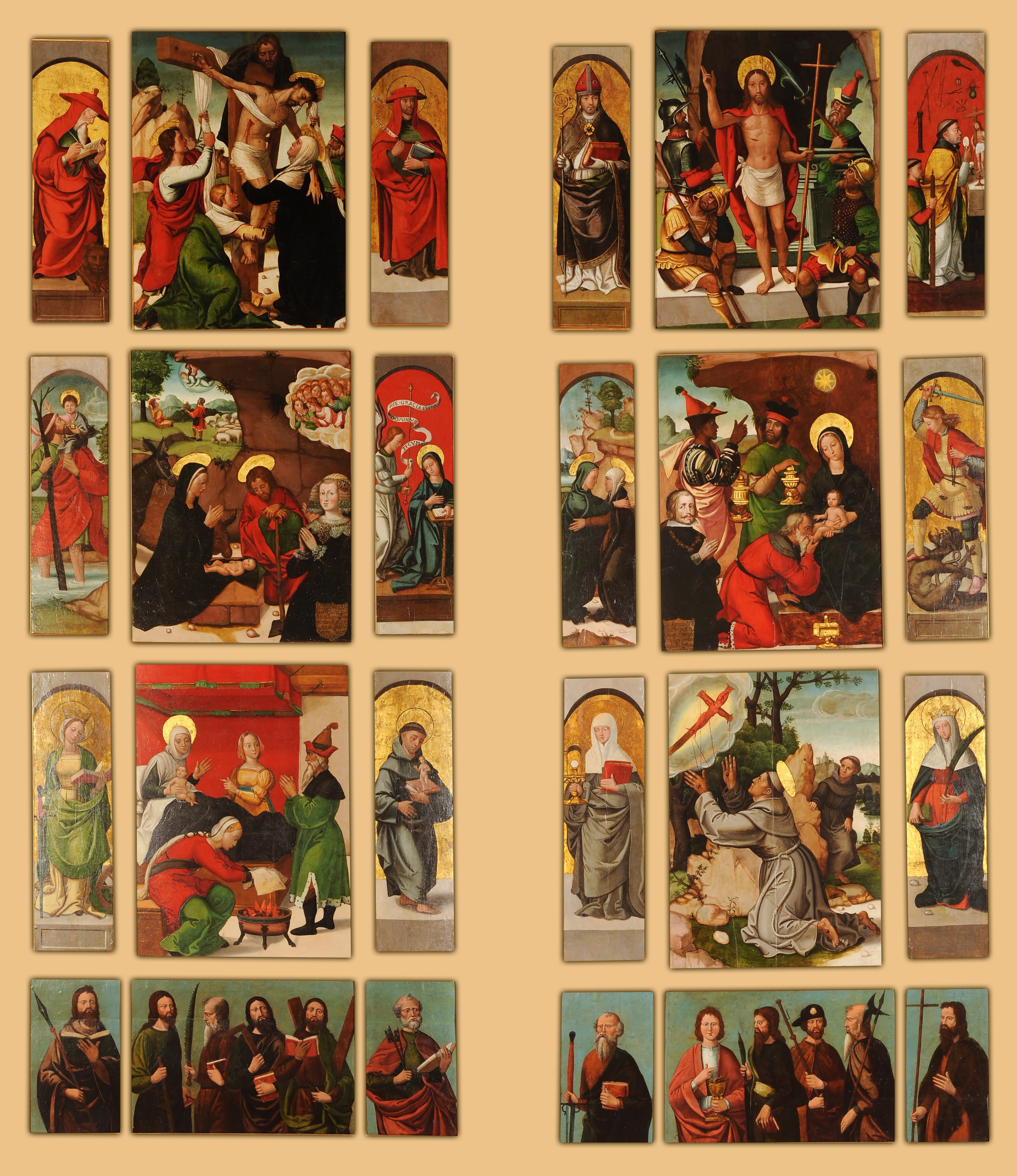
Altarpiece of Santa Ana. Museum of Santa Cruz (Toledo)

Francisco de Comontes (? – February 12, 1565, in Toledo) was a Spanish painter.

== Biography ==
A son of Iñigo de Comontes, executed in 1533 the principal retablo of the chapel of Los Reyes Nuevos in Toledo cathedral, from the design of Felipe de Vigarny. In 1545–7, he painted for the winter chapter room portraits of Cardinal Archbishop Tavera and Archbishop Siliceo; in the latter year he was appointed painter to the cathedral, which office he retained until his death in 1565. Pictures on panel of the 'Virgin and St. Bartholomew,' placed in 1659 in a retablo gilt by his own hands, in the chapel of the Tower, are considered his best works.
