= Alcáçovas =

Alcáçovas may refer to:

- Treaty of Alcáçovas
- Viana do Alentejo#Parishes
