= War of the Castilian Succession =

Civil war in the Kingdom of Castile (1475–1479)

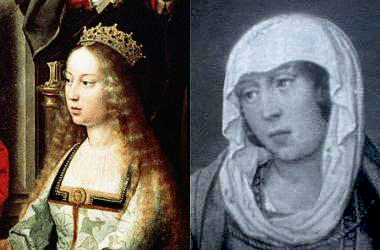
- The two primary claimants: Isabella I of Castile and Joanna la Beltraneja
Date	1475 – 4 September 1479
Location	Iberian Peninsula and Atlantic Ocean
Result	Treaty of Alcáçovas: Isabella is recognised as Queen of Castile; Marriage of Isabella of Aragon (daughter of Ferdinand and Isabella) to Afonso of Portugal (grandson of Afonso V); Portugal gains hegemony in the Atlantic south of the Canary Islands; Portugal recognizes Castile's claim to the Canary Islands

Belligerents
Isabella's supporters; Crown of Aragon	Joanna's supporters; Kingdom of Portugal; Kingdom of France

Commanders and leaders
Isabella I of Castile; Pedro González de Mendoza; Beltrán de la Cueva; Francisco Ramírez; Pérez de Guzmán; Ferdinand II of Aragon; Alonso de Cárdenas; Rodrigo Manrique †; Jorge Manrique †	Joanna 'la Beltraneja'; Alfonso Carrillo de Acuña; Diego López Pacheco; Álvaro de Zúñiga; Ponce de León; Rodrigo Téllez Girón; Afonso V of Portugal; John of Portugal; Louis XI of France

After the death of King Henry IV of Castile in late 1474, the supporters of his reputed daughter, Joanna 'la Beltraneja', waged a war for the succession to the Crown of Castile against the supporters of his half-sister, Isabella, who prevailed by 1479. The war had a marked international character, as Isabella was married to Ferdinand, heir apparent to the Crown of Aragon, while Joanna married her uncle King Afonso V of Portugal at the suggestion of her supporters. France intervened in support of Portugal, as they were rivals with Aragon for territory in Italy and Roussillon.

Despite a few initial successes by the supporters of Joanna, a lack of military aggressiveness by Afonso V and the stalemate in the Battle of Toro (1476) led to the disintegration of Joanna's alliance and the recognition of Isabella in the Courts of Madrigal-Segovia (April–October 1476): "In 1476, immediately after the indecisive battle of Peleagonzalo [near Toro], Ferdinand and Isabella hailed the result as a great victory and called Courts at Madrigal. The newly gained prestige was used to win municipal support from their allies ..." (Marvin Lunenfeld).

The war between Castile and Portugal alone continued. This included naval warfare in the Atlantic, which became more important: a struggle for maritime access to the wealth of Guinea (gold and slaves). In 1478, the Portuguese navy defeated the Castilians in the decisive Battle of Guinea.

The war concluded in 1479 with the Treaty of Alcáçovas, which recognized Isabella and Ferdinand as sovereigns of Castile and granted Portugal hegemony in the Atlantic, with the exception of the Canary Islands. Joanna lost her right to the throne of Castile and remained in Portugal until her death.

This conflict has also been called the Second Castilian Civil War, but this name may lead to confusion with the other civil wars that involved Castile in the 14th and 15th centuries. Some authors refer to it as the War of Portugal; however, this name clearly represents a Castilian point of view and implicitly denies Joanna's claim. At other times the term Peninsular War has been used, but it is easily confused with the Peninsular War of 1808–1814, part of the Napoleonic Wars. Some authors prefer the neutral expression War of 1475–1479.

== Background ==
=== Succession to Crown of Castile ===
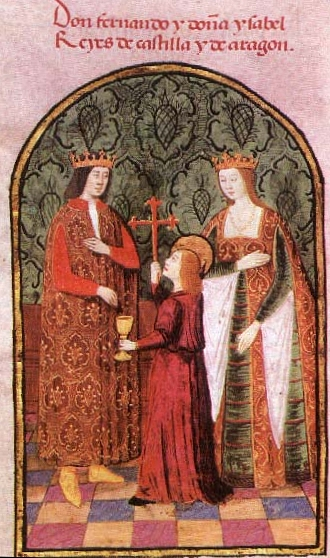
Isabella and Ferdinand

Joanna, born in 1462, was the only child born to King Henry IV of Castile and was called Princess of Asturias as heir presumptive to the throne. A rumour spread that she was not actually the daughter of King Henry but rather of Beltrán de la Cueva, the alleged lover of Henry's wife, Joan of Portugal. Joanna was thus nicknamed "la Beltraneja", as a mocking reference to her assumed father. Pressure from members of the nobility forced the King to strip her of the title and name his half-brother Alfonso as heir presumptive in 1465.

In June 1465, a group of nobility assembled in Ávila, deposed King Henry in effigy and declared Alfonso the king of Castile. In 1467, the rebels were defeated by Henry at Olmeda but the death of Alfonso in 1468 aroused suspicions and increased tensions among the nobles who now favored the accession of Henry's half-sister, Isabel of Castile.

The resulting dispute between supporters of Joanna and Isabella was resolved with the Treaty of the Bulls of Guisando, which gave Isabella succession rights but restricted her marriage options. Nevertheless, Isabella secretly married Ferdinand in 1469 at the age of 17, ignoring Henry IV's wishes.

Gradually, the couple gained a larger number of supporters and obtained a papal bull sanctioning their marriage from Pope Sixtus IV in 1472 and gained the support of the powerful Mendoza family in 1473.

When Henry IV died in December 1474, both candidates for the throne were proclaimed Queen of Castile by their respective supporters. Aware of their position of weakness against Isabella's supporters, Joanna's supporters proposed for the 43-year-old King Afonso V of Portugal, a widower for some 20 years, to marry Joanna, his niece, and assume the throne of Castile with her.

=== International alliances ===
Western Europe in 1470

The Kingdom of France and the Crown of Aragon maintained a long-held rivalry for the control of Roussillon and, more recently, for hegemony in Italy. In June 1474, French troops invaded Roussillon and the Aragonese were forced to retreat. On the possibility that the heir to the throne of Aragon would also become King of Castile, Louis XI of France officially positioned himself on the side of Joanna and Afonso in September 1475.

France was simultaneously at war with the Duchy of Burgundy. That made Burgundy into theoretical allies of Isabella's supporters, but in practice, it continued its war against France without coordinating their actions with the Isabella alliance.

The Kingdom of England was also briefly at war with France with the disembarkation of King Edward IV in Calais in June 1475, but by a quick diplomatic response, Louis negotiated peace with Edward and signed the Treaty of Picquigny in August. Edward IV accepted a truce of nine years, in exchange for significant economic compensation, and returned to England.

The Kingdom of Navarre was experiencing an intermittent civil war, and the Muslim Kingdom of Granada remained neutral despite Portuguese efforts to draw it into the war.

=== Rivalry between Castile and Portugal in the Atlantic ===
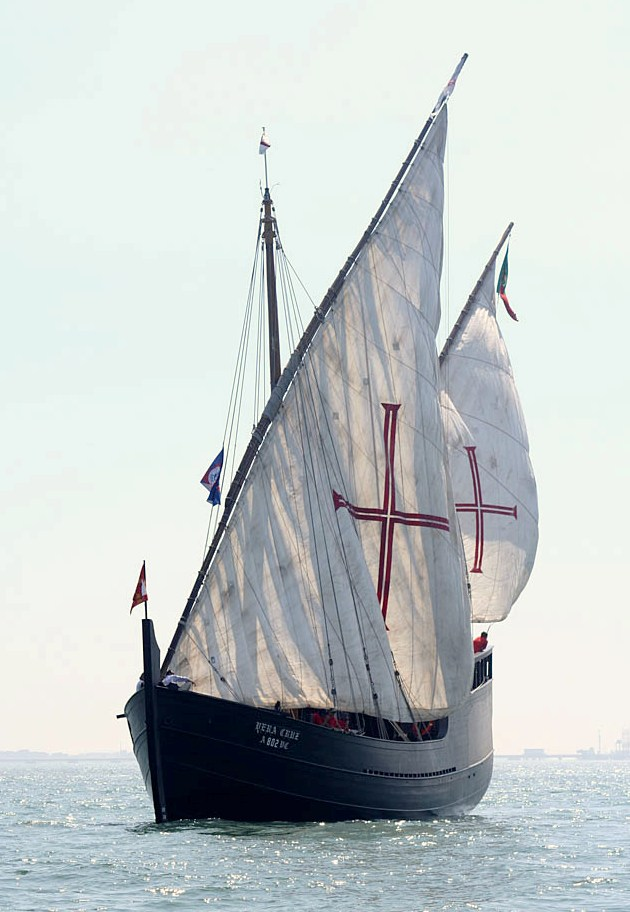
Modern reconstruction of a Portuguese caravel

Throughout the 15th century, merchants, explorers, and fishermen of Portugal and Castile had been penetrating further into the Atlantic Ocean. The possession of the Canary Islands was a point of contention between the two Crowns. Later on, the control of commerce with the territories of Guinea and Elmina, rich in gold and enslaved people, grew to a dispute of even greater importance.

During the first half of the century, Castile staged the conquest of a few of the Canary Islands (Lanzarote, Fuerteventura, Hierro, and La Gomera) by feudal pacts, first with Norman knights and later with Castilian nobles. Portugal opposed Castilian authority on the islands and continued the exploration of Guinea, with significant commercial benefits.

Beginning in 1452, Pope Nicholas V and his successor, Callixtus III, modified the previous policy of the neutrality of the Holy See and issued a series of bulls favourable to Portugal. They gave Portugal commercial control and ample religious authority over all of Guinea, and in areas "further beyond". The Holy See did not arbitrate the question of the Canaries, whose conquest had been left relatively suspended. The King of Portugal adopted a freer commercial policy that allowed foreign subjects to trade on the African coasts, in exchange for taxes.

In August 1475, after the start of the war, Isabella claimed that parts of Africa and Guinea belonged to Castile by right and incited Castilian merchants to sail to them. That initiated a naval war in the Atlantic.

== Conflict ==
=== Combatants in 1475 ===
In favour of Joanna:

- Portugal
- France
- Some of the high Castilian nobility and descendants of Portuguese families who settled in Castile after 1385; the Archbishop of Toledo (Alfonso Carrillo de Acuña); the Estúñiga family, with land bordering Portugal and Navarrese ancestors; the Marquis of Villena (Diego López Pacheco); the Marquis of Cádiz (Rodrigo Ponce de León); and the grandmaster of the Order of Calatrava (Rodrigo Téllez Girón).

In favour of Isabella:

- The Crown of Aragon
- The rest of the Castilian nobility: the powerful Mendoza family; the Manrique de Lara family; the Duke of Medina Sidonia (Enrique Pérez de Guzmán); Beltrán de la Cueva; the Order of Santiago and the Order of Calatrava, except its grandmaster.

The Duchy of Burgundy and the Kingdom of England were at war with France in 1475, but they did not coordinate their actions with the supporters of Isabella and so are rarely considered part of the Isabella alliance.

=== Fight for throne (May 1475 – September 1476) ===
==== Afonso V enters Castile ====
A Portuguese army entered the territory of the Crown of Castile under the command of Afonso V on May 10, 1475, and advanced to Plasencia, where Joanna was expecting him. Joanna and Afonso were proclaimed sovereigns of Castile on May 25 and were married; the required Papal dispensation (Joanna was Afonso's niece) arrived a few months later. From Plasencia, they marched to Arévalo, with the intention of heading towards Burgos. There, Afonso hoped to be able to unite with any troops sent by his ally, Louis XI of France.

The castle of Burgos and the cities of Plasencia and Arévalo were controlled by the Estúñiga family, supporters of Joanna. The city of Burgos, controlled by the Fernandez de Velasco family, backed Isabella.

Afonso found fewer supporters in Castile than he expected and changed his plans, preferring to instead consolidate his control in the area closest to Portugal, in particular Toro, a city that received him favourably even though the garrison of the castle proclaimed itself loyal to Isabella. Zamora and other Leonese villages of the lower Douro also accepted him.

In La Mancha, Rodrigo Tellez-Giron, the Master of the Order of Calatrava, supporter of Joanna, conquered Ciudad Real. Rodrigo Manrique, treasurer of that same Order and the Master of the Order of Santiago, reconquered the city for Isabella.

Ferdinand concentrated an army in Tordesillas, and on July 15, he ordered it to march to seek an encounter with Afonso. Four days later, they arrived at Toro, where the King of Portugal avoided direct combat. Ferdinand, lacking the necessary resources for a prolonged siege, was forced to return to Tordesillas and disband his army. The castle of Toro surrendered to Afonso V, who returned to Arévalo to wait for the expected French intervention.

Rodrigo Alfonso Pimentel, Count of Benavente and supporter of Isabella, situated himself with a small force in Baltanás to monitor the Portuguese. He was attacked on November 18, 1475 and was defeated and imprisoned. Even though this victory opened the way to Burgos, Afonso V decided once again to withdraw, now to Zamora. His lack of aggressiveness debilitated the Joanna alliance in Castile, which began to disintegrate.

==== Isabellian counterattack ====
Supporters of Isabella counterattacked by taking Trujillo and gaining control of the lands of the Order of Alcántara, a significant portion of those of the Order of Calatrava, and of the Marquisate of Villena. On December 4, part of the garrison in Zamora rebelled against King Afonso, who was forced to flee to Toro. The Portuguese garrison maintained control of the castle, but the city received Prince Ferdinand the following day.

In January 1476, the castle of Burgos surrendered to Isabella by a pact that avoided reprisals against the defeated.

==== Battle of Toro ====
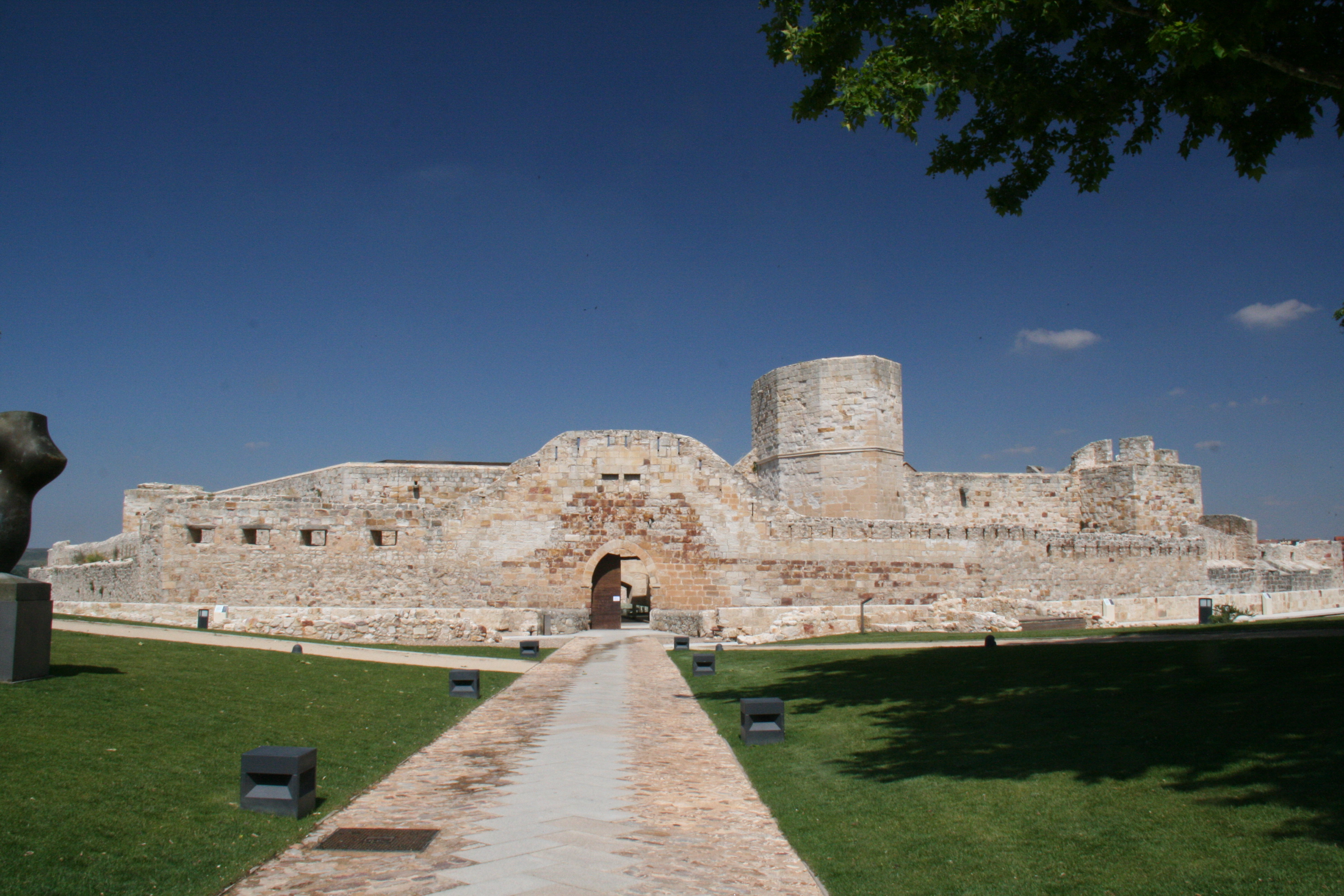
Castle of Zamora

In February 1476, the Portuguese army, reinforced by troops brought by John II of Portugal, son of Afonso V, left its base in Toro and surrounded Ferdinand in Zamora. The siege took a worse toll on the Portuguese than on those under siege because of the Castilian winter, and on March 1, Afonso V withdrew back towards Toro. Ferdinand and his troops launched a pursuit and caught up to the Portuguese one league (about 5 km) from Toro, and combat began.

After three hours of fighting interrupted by rain and nightfall, the King of Portugal withdrew to Castronuño with part of his troops. His son, John, remained near Toro, retreating with his army in an organized fashion towards the city and even taking a few enemy prisoners. As summarized by Irish scholar John B. Bury: "After nine months, occupied with frontier raids and fruitless negotiations, the Castilian and Portuguese armies met at Toro... and fought an indecisive battle, for while Afonso was beaten and fled, his son John destroyed the forces opposed to him...."

Publicists from both sides claimed victory. Politically, the battle was decisive because subsequently the bulk of the Portuguese troops retreated back to Portugal along with Joanna, whose side now had hardly any troops in Castile.

==== War at sea ====
One of the objectives of Isabella and Ferdinand was to challenge Portugal's monopoly on the rich Atlantic territories of Guinea. The gold and purchased slaves constituted an important source of income which could be used to finance the war, and therefore expeditions to Guinea became a priority for both belligerent sides.

Portuguese ships had transversed the Andalusian coast, apprehending fishing and merchant ships, since the start of the war. To stop this, Isabella and Ferdinand sent four galleys under the command of Álvaro de la Nava, who stopped the Portuguese incursions and plundered the Portuguese city of Alcoutim on the Guadiana River.

Sailors from Palos de la Frontera pillaged the coasts of Guinea. Alfonso de Palencia, official chronicler of Isabella, narrates an expedition in which two caravels from Palos captured 120 Africans and sold them as slaves. Despite protests by the monarchs, shortly afterwards another fleet of three caravels captured an African king and 140 nobles of his village.

In May 1476, Isabella ordered the liberation of the "King of Guinea" and his entourage. The order was only partly obeyed, as the king was liberated and returned to Guinea, but his companions were all sold as slaves.

In 1476, a Portuguese fleet of twenty ships commanded by Fernão Gomes set sail towards Guinea to attempt to regain control there. The King of Castile ordered the preparation of a fleet to apprehend the Portuguese and appointed Carlos de Valera to command. He had numerous problems preparing the expedition, because he was opposed by the Marquis of Cadiz, the Duke of Medina Sidonia, and the Estuñiga family.

The preparations were also delayed by a naval battle that took place when the Castilians found out that one or two Portuguese ships with a rich cargo had left the Mediterranean to return to Portugal under the escort of the pirate Alvar Méndez. A fleet of five galleys and five caravels captained by Carlos de Valera and Andrés Sonier intercepted them in Sanlúcar de Barrameda, and were victorious after a hard-fought battle.

Valera gathered a fleet of three Basque ships and nine Andalusian caravels (25 caravels according to Palencia), all heavily armed. There was no longer any possibility of intercepting the Portuguese fleet so he decided, after stopping at Porto Santo Island, to head towards the island of António Noli in the Cape Verde archipelago, near the coast of Guinea. They plundered the island and captured António Noli, who then held the territory feudally from the King of Portugal.

They next set sail for the coast of Africa, where they captured two caravels owned by the Marquis of Cadiz containing a shipment of 500 slaves. The sailors from Palos separated themselves from the expedition at this point. They were the most knowledgeable in the maritime navigation of Guinea so Valera returned to Andalusia.

This expedition obtained few economic benefits, as most of the slaves were returned to the Marquis of Cadiz, and Valera was forced to indemnify the Duke of Medina Sidonia for the damages caused on the Island of Noli, which the Duke claimed as his.

==== French intervention ====
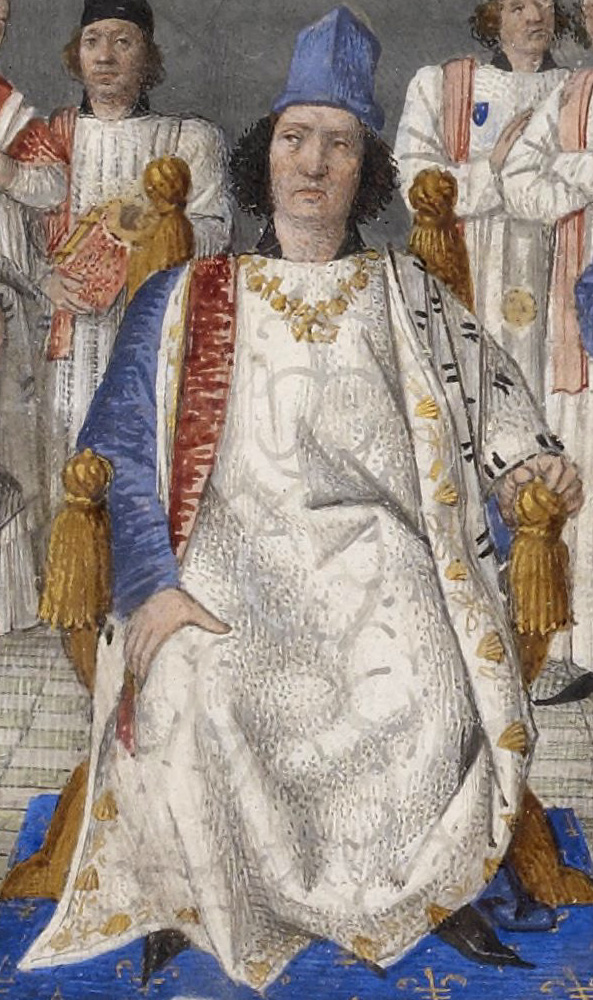
Louis XI of France

On September 23, 1475, Louis XI of France signed a treaty of alliance with Afonso V of Portugal.

Between March and June 1476, French troops captained by Alain I of Albret tried to cross the border at Fuenterrabía but were repelled. Ferdinand took advantage of the situation to secure his position in the unsettled Kingdom of Navarre. In August, negotiations began in Tudela, which culminated with the signing of an accord by which the belligerent parties of the Navarrese Civil War put an end to their conflict. Ferdinand obtained the control of Viana, Puente La Reina, and other strongholds, as well as the right to maintain a garrison of 150 lances in Pamplona.

Thus, Castile strengthened itself militarily against a possible French penetration into Navarre.

On August 1476, Afonso V of Portugal departed towards France after signing a truce with Isabella and Ferdinand. There he tried to convince Louis XI to involve France to a greater extent in the war. Louis refused, as he was focused on defeating his main enemy, Charles the Bold, Duke of Burgundy.

==== Battle of Cabo São Vicente ====
The King of France sent the fleet of Norman pirate Guillaume Coullon as aid to Portugal. In August 1476, King Afonso sent two Portuguese galleys loaded with soldiers along with the 11 ships of Coullon to come in the aid of the castle of Ceuta. On August 7, this fleet encountered five armed merchant ships from Cadiz heading for England: three Genoese carracks, a galley, and a Flemish vessel. Coullon attempted to capture the merchants through a ploy, but failed, and was forced to engage in combat. The Franco-Portuguese side emerged victorious. Due to the use of incendiary weapons by the French, fire razed two Genoese ships, the Flemish vessel, two Portuguese galleys, and two of Coullon's ships. According to Palencia, some 2,500 French and Portuguese died.

=== Consolidation of Isabella and Ferdinand (September 1476 – January 1479) ===
After their strategic victory at the battle of Toro, the repulsion of the French attack, and the truce with Afonso V, Isabella and Ferdinand were in a powerful position to obtain the throne of Castile. Nobles of the Joanna alliance were forced to accept the circumstances and gradually pledged their allegiance to Isabella and Ferdinand. The war was reduced to skirmishes along the Portuguese border and the continuation of the naval war for control of the Atlantic commerce.

==== Submission of the Joanna alliance to Isabella and Ferdinand ====
Throughout 1476, supporters of Joanna from the nobility continued to submit to Isabella and Ferdinand, particularly those from the Pacheco-Girón lineage: Juan Téllez-Girón and his brother Rodrigo; Luis de Portocarrero; and, in September, the Marquis of Villena.

In November 1476, Isabella's troops captured the castle of Toro. In the following months, they took control of the last bordering localities controlled by the Portuguese and dealt with their adversaries in Extremadura.

In July 1477, Isabella arrived in Seville, the most populous city of Castile, with the objective of asserting her power over the nobility of Andalusia.

In April 1476, Isabella and Ferdinand gave their first exculpation to the Marquis of Cadiz. He had been regaining power while his rival, the Duke of Medina Sidonia, initially the main Isabella supporter in Andalusia, had been falling into dishonour. Through skilful negotiations, the Queen managed to take control of the main strongholds of Seville occupied by the Marquis and the Duke and, instead of returning them to their legitimate owners, named others as their heads.

She prohibited both nobles from entering the city of Seville, under the pretext that their simultaneous presence there would risk violent conflicts. In this way the Duke's political dominance over Seville disappeared, and the city passed into the control of the Crown.

One of the few nobles that refused to submit to the monarchs was Marshall Fernán Arias de Saavedra. Isabella's troops laid siege to his fortress at Utrera, and conquered it by assault in March 1478. The defeated suffered harsh repression.

The first son of the monarchs, John of Aragon and Castile, was born in Seville on June 30, 1478, which opened new possibilities for dynastic stability of the Isabellian side.

==== Return of Afonso V ====
After his diplomatic failure in France, Afonso V decided to return to Portugal. When he arrived in Portugal in October 1477, he found that his son John had proclaimed himself king. However, John happily received the return of his father and returned the Crown to him immediately.

==== Expeditions to Guinea and Canary Islands, 1478 ====
In 1477, a fleet departed from Andalusia headed for Guinea.

At the beginning of 1478, the monarchs prepared two new expeditions from the port of Sanlúcar de Barrameda, one directed towards Elmina and the other, consisting of at least 35 ships, with the aim of conquering the island of Gran Canaria.

Prince John of Portugal, aware of the Castilian plans, prepared an armada to surprise his enemies in the Canary Islands. The Castilian fleet at Gran Canaria was still disembarking its troops when news arrived that a Portuguese squadron was approaching. The Castilian fleet immediately set sail, leaving 300 Castilian soldiers behind. These troops managed to prevent a Portuguese disembarkation. The detachment was insufficient to conquer the island and was left inactive until Castilian reinforcements arrived on the island the next year.

The other Castilian fleet arrived at Elmina and obtained sizeable quantities of gold. The fleet remained stationed there for a few months, under the orders of the commercial representative of the Crown. The Portuguese fleet arrived, and the Castilians were attacked. They were defeated and taken as prisoners to Lisbon. According to Hernando del Pulgar, the gold King Afonso captured allowed him to relaunch the war on land against Castile. Portuguese sources affirm that both the prisoners and a significant portion of the captured gold were returned to Castile after the signing of peace in 1479.

==== Peace between Castile and France ====
Towards the end of 1478, before word of the defeat at Elmina arrived in Castile, an embassy from King Louis XI of France offered a peace treaty to Isabella and Ferdinand. It was signed in Guadalupe and included the following clauses:

- Louis XI recognized Isabella and Ferdinand as Monarchs of Castile and León.
- Ferdinand agreed to break his alliance with Maximilian I, Duke of Burgundy.
- Both parties agreed to the arbitration of affairs relative to Roussillon.

=== Final phases (January – September 1479) ===
Towards the end of 1478, some of Joanna's supporters revolted in Extremadura, La Mancha (Marquis of Villena), and Galicia. The Portuguese, reinforced by the naval victory at Guinea, once again intervened in Castile in aid of their allies.

==== Portuguese offensive ====
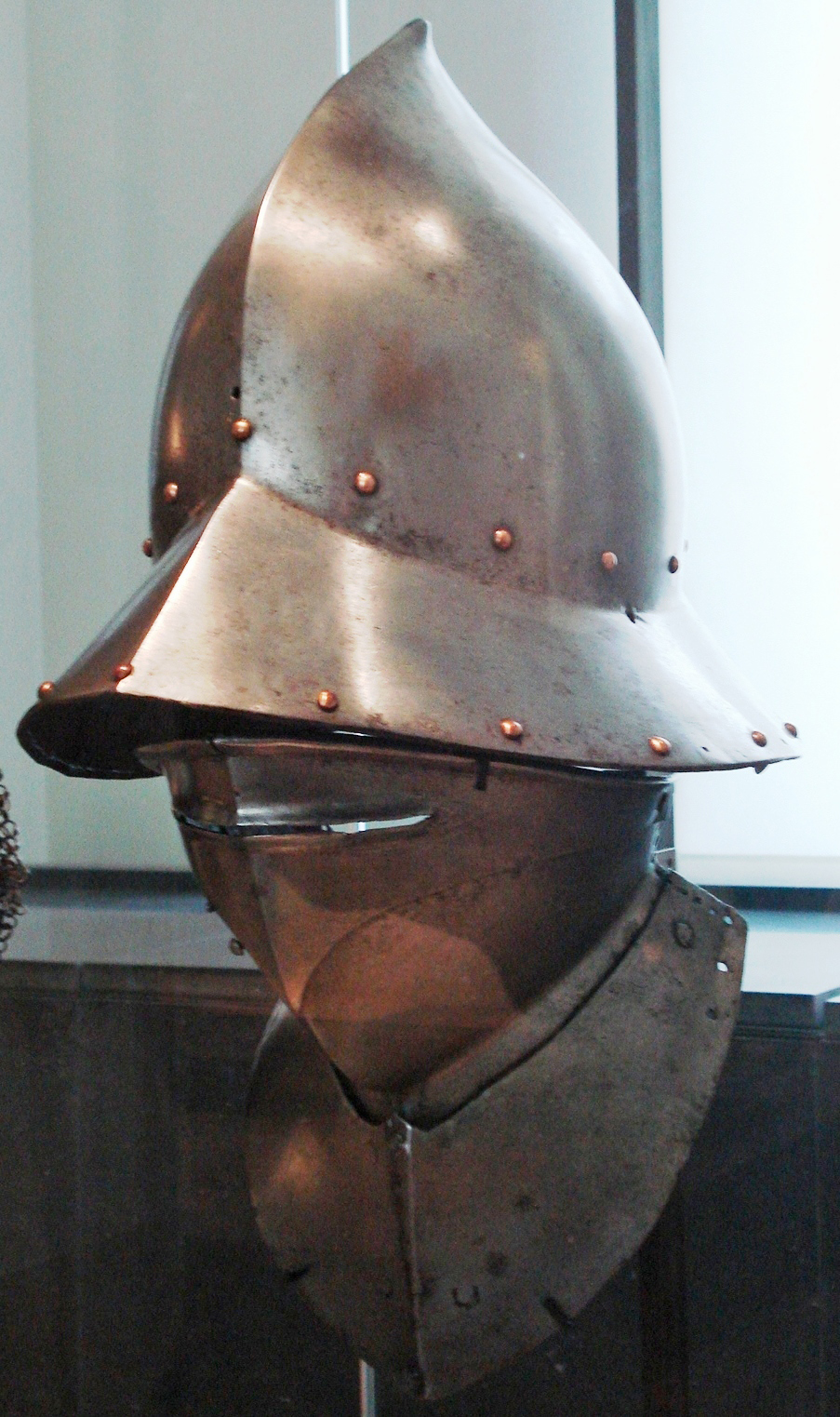
Aragonese helmet circa 1470.

In February 1479, a Portuguese army commanded by Garcia de Meneses, Bishop of Évora, penetrated into Extremadura. His objective was to occupy and reinforce the strongholds of Mérida and Medellín, controlled by Beatriz Pacheco, Countess of Medellin and supporter of Afonso V. According to Palencia, the Portuguese army was composed of about 1,000 Knights (of which 250 were Castilians), plus infantry. 180 Knights of the Order of Santiago marched alongside him, commanded by their treasurer, Alfonso de Monroy.

On February 24, near the hill of Albuera, the army was challenged by Isabellian forces commanded by Alonso de Cárdenas, Master of the Order of Santiago. The army consisted of 500 Knights of the Order, 400 Knights of the Hermandad (mainly from Seville), and 100 infantrymen. The battle was heavily contested. The Isabellian infantry suffered a severe blow from the Juanist cavalry and became disorganized, but intervention by the Master of Santiago aided the panicked infantry. The Portuguese were forced to retreat, leaving significant spoils of war on the battlefield, as well as around 85 dead Knights. Only 15 Isabellian Knights were killed.

The bulk of the Portuguese army was able to take refuge in Mérida and from there continued its march to Medellín, which they occupied. Supporters of King Ferdinand placed Medellín and Mérida under siege.

==== The Pope switches sides ====
The nuncio Jacobo Rondón de Seseña arrived at Castile with notice that Pope Sixtus IV had reversed himself and had annulled the dispensation previously awarded to Afonso V for his marriage to his niece Joanna. This gravely debilitated the legitimacy of the Joannist side and the pretension of the King of Portugal to the throne of Castile.

==== Last Castilian initiatives at sea ====
In February 1479, Isabella and Ferdinand tried to organize a new fleet of about twenty caravels to expel the Portuguese from Elmina. However, they were unable to gather the necessary ships, and afterwards no expeditions of importance were launched up until the peace agreement with Portugal.

==== Peace talks ====
In April 1479, King Ferdinand arrived at Alcántara to participate in peace talks organized by Beatrice, daughter of Afonso V and aunt of Isabella of Castile. The negotiations lasted 50 days, but no agreement was reached.

The two sides continued the conflict, trying to better their respective positions in anticipation of new peace negotiations. Isabella and Ferdinand launched an offensive against Alfonso Carrillo de Acuña, Archbishop of Toledo, who was forced to surrender, which allowed the monarchs to challenge the Marquis of Villena. Meanwhile, the Portuguese garrisons in Extremadura successfully resisted a Castilian siege.

Peace negotiations were restarted in the summer, and an agreement was reached.

== Treaty ==
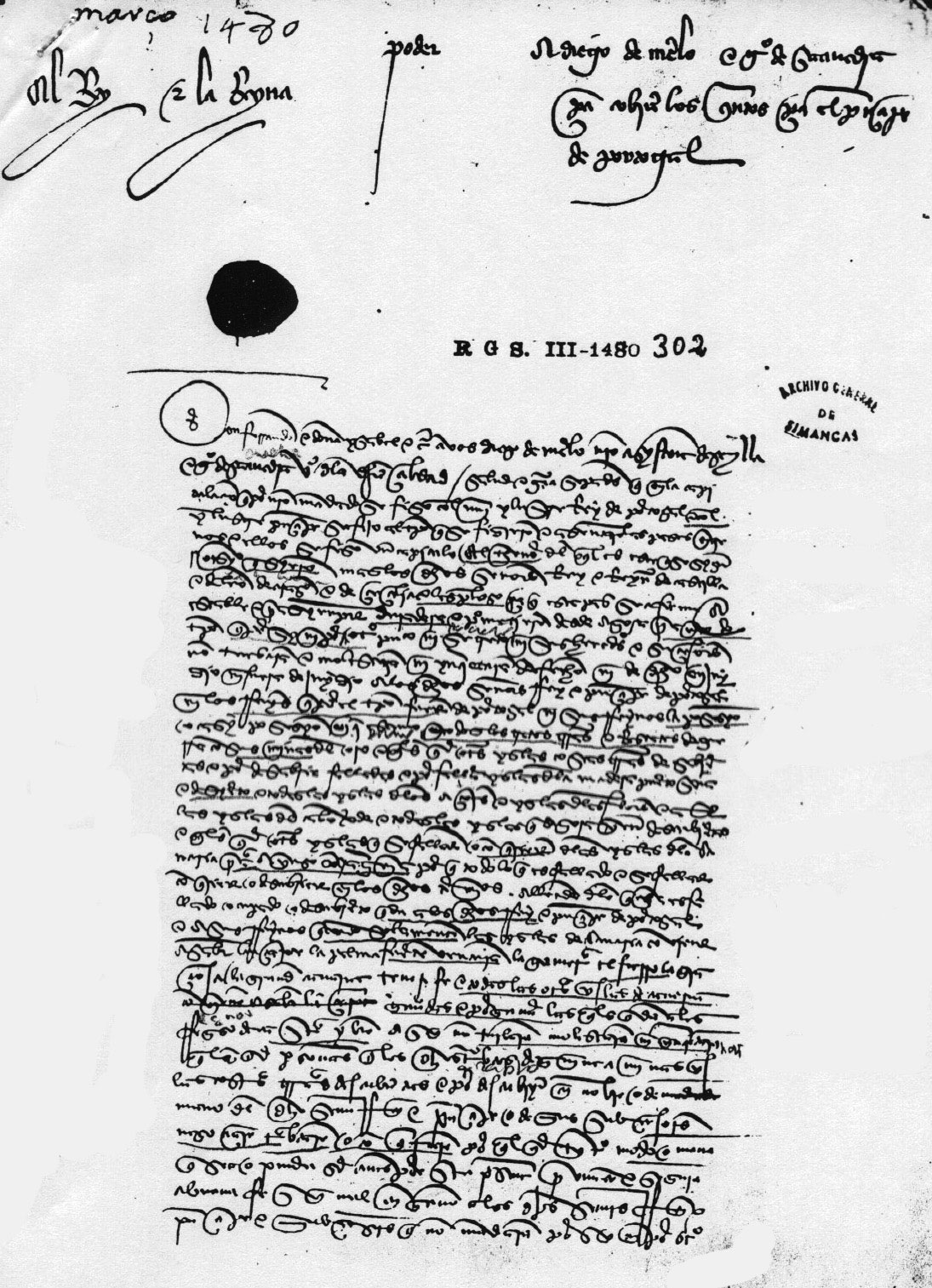
Treaty of Alcáçovas

The treaty that put an end to the war was signed in the Portuguese city of Alcáçovas (today in Viana do Alentejo) on September 4, 1479. The agreement was ratified by the King of Portugal on September 8, 1479 and by the Monarchs of Castile and Aragon in Toledo on March 6, 1480. It is also known as the Treaty of Alcáçovas-Toledo.

In it, Afonso V renounced his aspirations to the throne of Castile, and Isabella and Ferdinand renounced any aspirations to the Portuguese throne. The two Crowns divided their areas of influence in the Atlantic: Portugal gained control of most of the territories, with the exception of the Canary Islands (the islands of Gran Canaria, La Palma and Tenerife were yet to be conquered).

Joanna la Beltraneja renounced all her Castilian titles, and was given the option of either marrying the heir of Isabella and Ferdinand, Prince John, or retiring to a convent. Joanna chose to do the latter, although she remained active in politics until her death.

Isabella, Princess of Asturias (1470–1498), daughter of Isabella and Ferdinand, married Afonso, Prince of Portugal, the heir to the Portuguese throne; the parents of the bride paid a large dowry that in practice represented war compensation obtained by Portugal.
