= Battle of Axarquía =

Battle of Axarquía (1483)
- Part of the Spanish Reconquista and Granada War
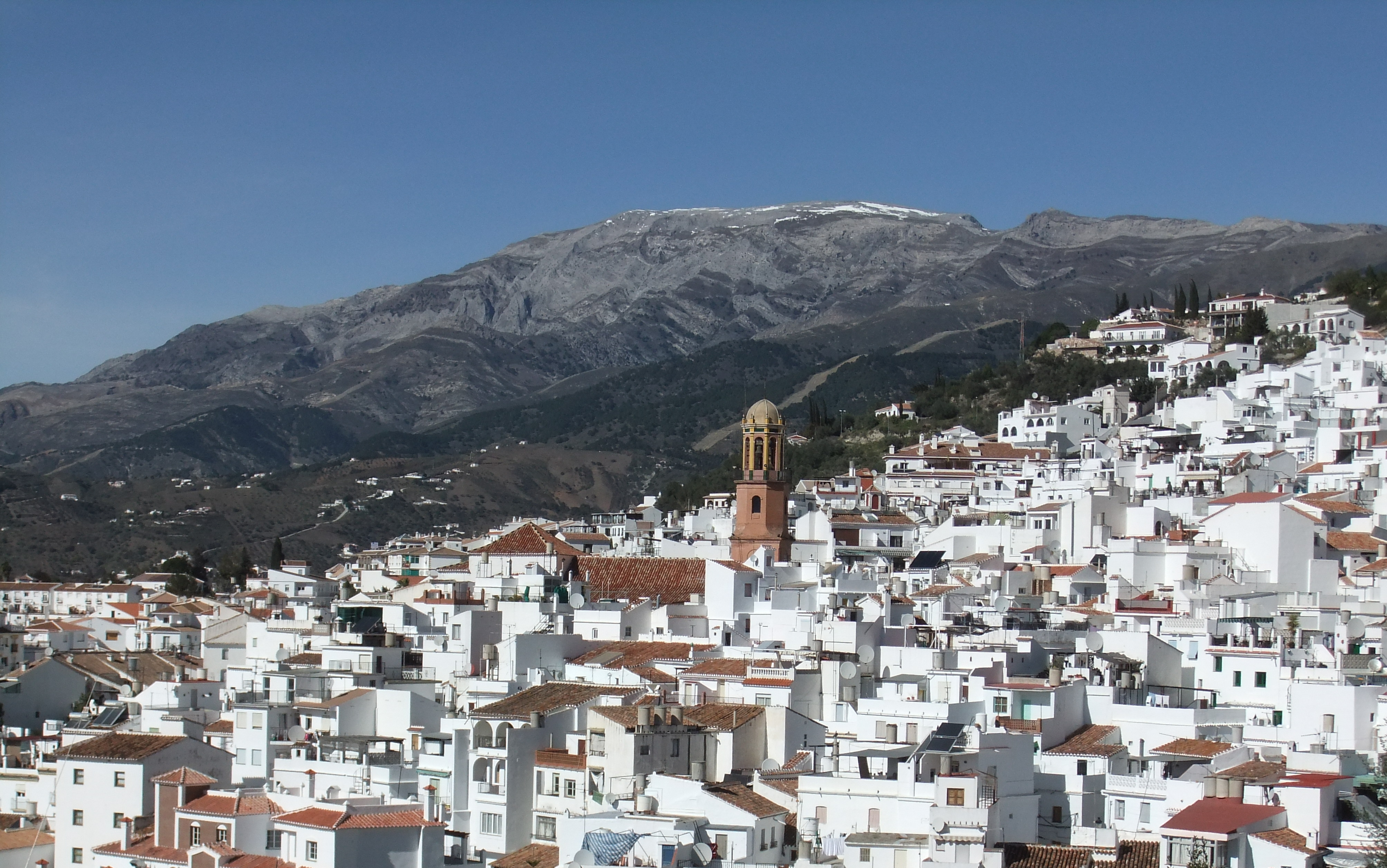
- Axarquía Mountain
Date	19–20 March 1483
Location	Axarquía, Spain
Result	Granadan victory

Belligerents
Crown of Castile: Order of Santiago	Emirate of Granada

Commanders and leaders
Don Pedro Henriquez; Don Juan de Silva (POW); Alonso de Aguiler; Marquis of Cadiz; Alonso de Cárdenas	Mulay Hassan; Muhammad Al-Zagal

Strength
4,000 men: 3,000 cavalry; 1,000 infantry	1,000 men: 500 cavalry; 500 infantry

Casualties and losses
800 killed 1,600 captured	Negligible

The battle of Axarquía was a military engagement between the Castilians and the Granadans. The Castilians launched a raid against Axarquía but were ambushed by the Granadans. The battle ended with a resounding Granadan victory.

== Background ==
In 1483, the Grand Master of Order of Santiago, Alonso de Cárdenas, was entrusted with the defense of the Écija frontier. He was urged to launch a raid against Málaga suburbs by his Moorish renegades. Malaga Enviro was famous for silk production and trade, which made large exports to Europe. Malaga was approached by mountains called Axarquía which had Granadan villages. The Grand Master dispatched messages to the Governor of Andalusia, Don Pedro Henriquez, the Count of Cifuentes, Don Juan de Silva, Alonso de Aguiler, and the Marquis of Cadiz, who all answered his call for the expedition. The Marquis advised against it but was overruled by the Grand Master.

== Battle ==
On Wednesday, March 19, 1483, the army marched to Axarquia. The vanguard was led by Don Pedro Henriquez and Alonso de Aguiler, the center by Don Juan de Silva and the Marquis of Cadiz, and the rearguard was led by the Grand Master. The army had a force of 3,000 knights and 1,000 infantry. Before the arrival of the Christians, the inhabitants of the mountain were warned of the upcoming attack and evacuated their homes quickly. The Christians arrived there and began plundering and burning the villages, making enormous loot. After watching their villages burned by the Castilians, they determined for revenge by setting up ambushes on the next day as darkness fell.

The Sultan of Granada, Mulay Hassan, and his brother, Al-Zagal, marched towards Axarquia with a cavalry force. The Castilian camp was full of riches and loot they had captured, making their march slower along with their ignorance of mountain passes. The Granadans arrived and met Christians and routed them, throwing them into the mountain defiles. At every pass, Moors were awaiting the Christians. They also used artillery to bombard the Castilians. Arrows and rocks hurled from the top.

The Castilians desperately attempted to descend to the narrow valleys, which were further complicated by rocks hurled from above. Proving resistance was futile, the army was broken and scattered, finding the Moors awaiting for them. The Marquis of Cadiz was able to escape with 60 or 70 cavalry. Don Pedro Henriquez, Alonso de Aguiler, and the Grand Master were able to escape; however, Don Juan de Silva was captured. The Castilians suffered 800 killed and 1,600 captured. The Granadan forces were smaller, and their casualties were negligible.

== Aftermath ==
The flower of Andalusian forces were killed in the battle. 400 captains were killed alongside 30 captains from Santiago's Order. The defeat was likely the treachery of the Moorish renegades, who informed the Sultan of their plans. The disaster created sorrow in Castile, and Isabella I of Castile was deeply saddened by the news. Contemporary accounts indicate self-doubt is now prevalent in Castile due to this defeat and the Loja fiasco.

However, in the next month, the new Granadan Sultan, Boabdil, would launch a raid into Castilian territory that would end up disastrously with him being captured by the Castilians.

== Sources ==
- William Hickling Prescott (1868), History of the Reign of Ferdinand and Isabella, the Catholic.
- Jean Baptiste Rosario (1897), Isabella the Catholic, Queen of Spain, Her Life, Reign, and Times, 1451-1504.
- Roger Boase (2017), Secrets of Pinar's Game (2 Vols), Court Ladies and Courtly Verse in Fifteenth-Century Spain.
- J. Edwards (2014), Ferdinand and Isabella.
