= Castle of Viana do Alentejo =

Gothic castle in Viana do Alentejo, Alentejo, Portugal

- Castelo de Viana do Alentejo
- Évora, Alentejo Central, Alentejo in Portugal
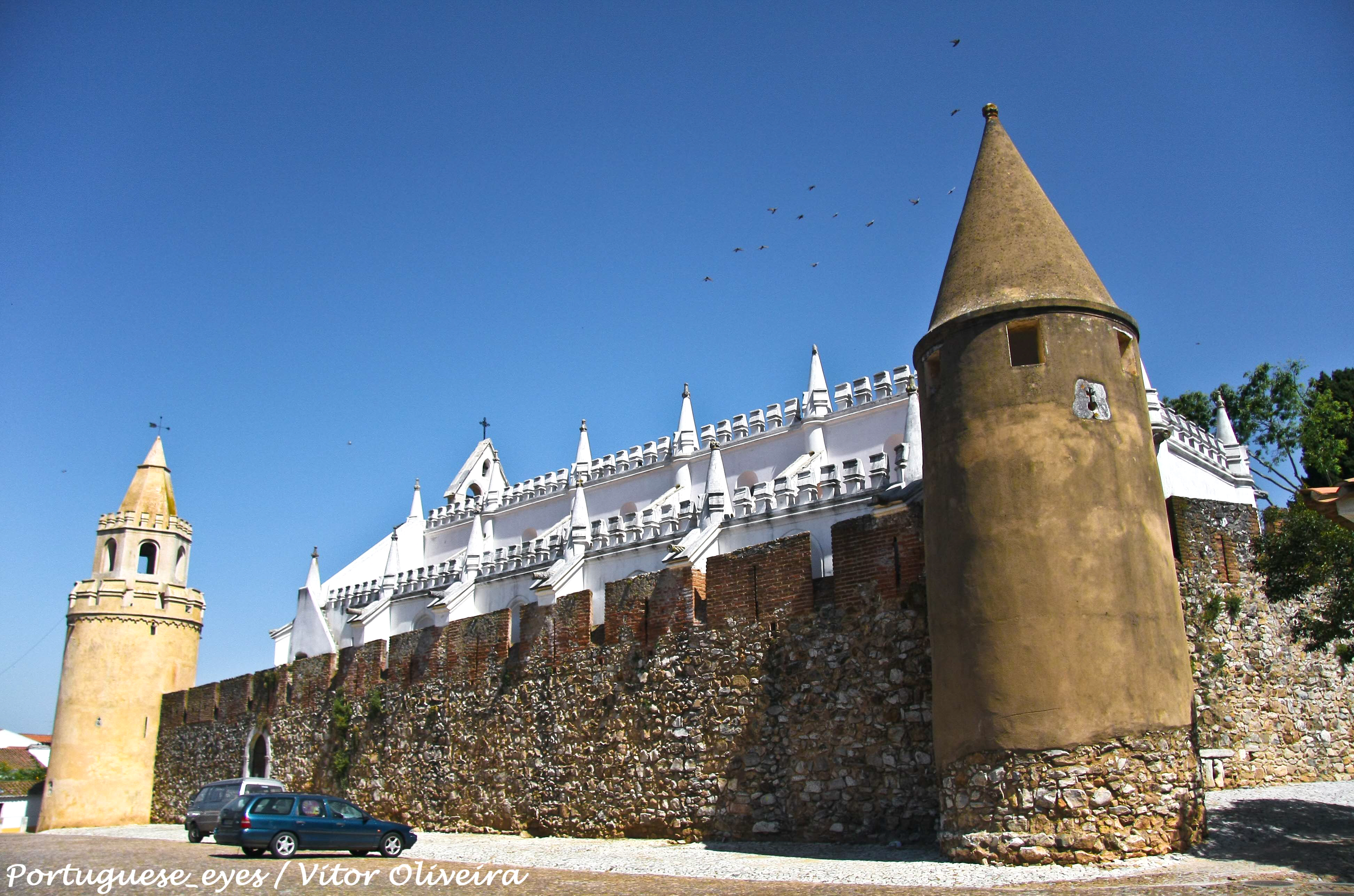
- The low-rising walls, Gothic towers and dependencies of the Castle of Viana do Alentejo

Site information
- Type: Castle
- Owner: Portuguese Republic
- Operator: Direcção Regional de Cultura do Alentejo
- Open to the public: Public

Location
- Coordinates: 38°19′55.49″N 8°0′5.75″W

Site history
- Built: 1313
- Materials: Stone, Masonry

The Castle of Viana do Alentejo (Portuguese: Castelo de Viana do Alentejo) is a gothic castle constructed during the reconquest and settlement of the central region of the Portuguese Alentejo, located in the parish of Viana do Alentejo, municipality of the same name. Although a relatively low-profile design, in comparison to its contemporaries (such as the Castle of Portel or Castle of Feira), the structure served the period of strife associated with expansion of Portuguese forces/authority into the southern Algarve.

== History ==
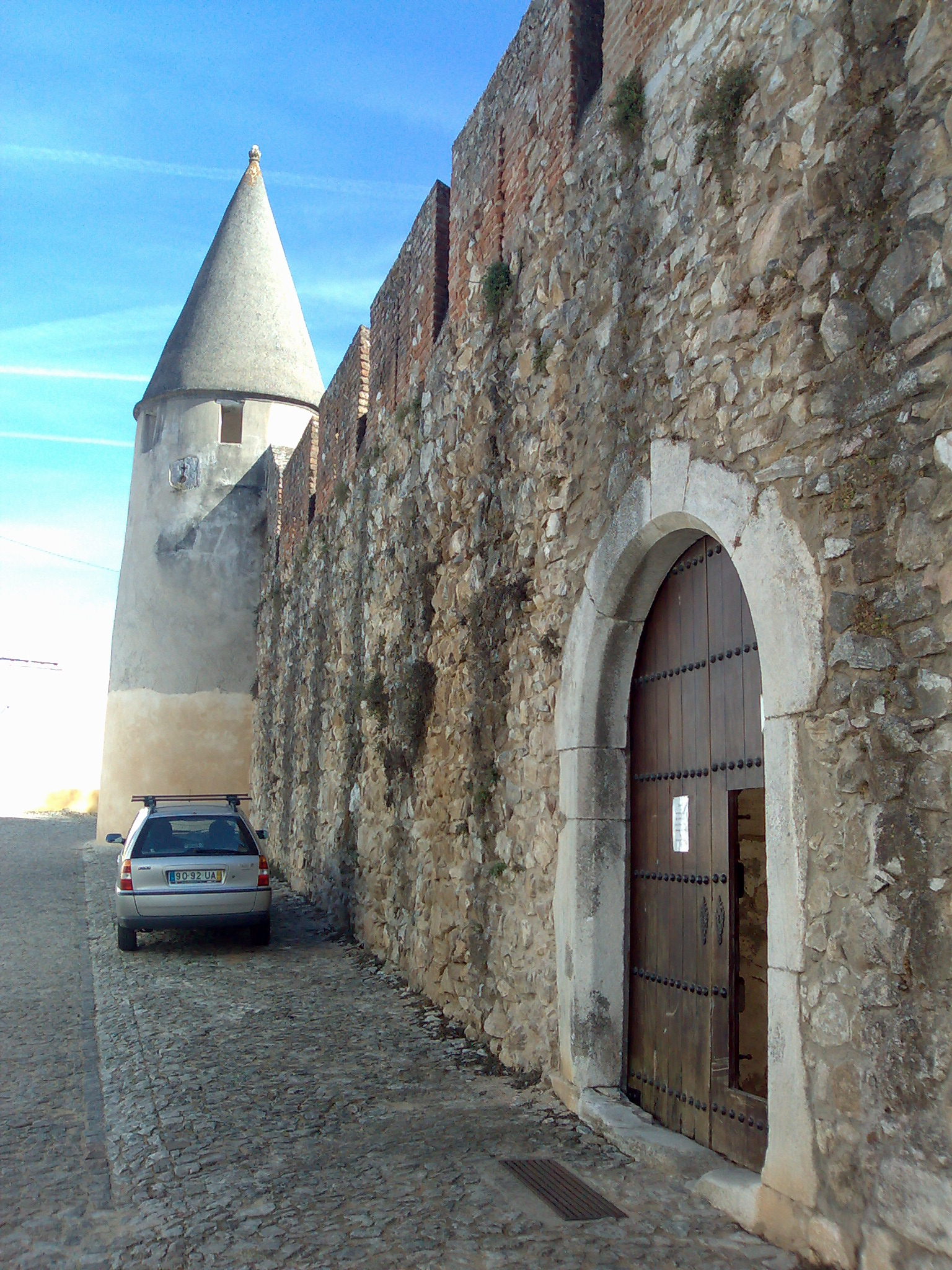
One of the simple gates and cylindrical towers of the Castle

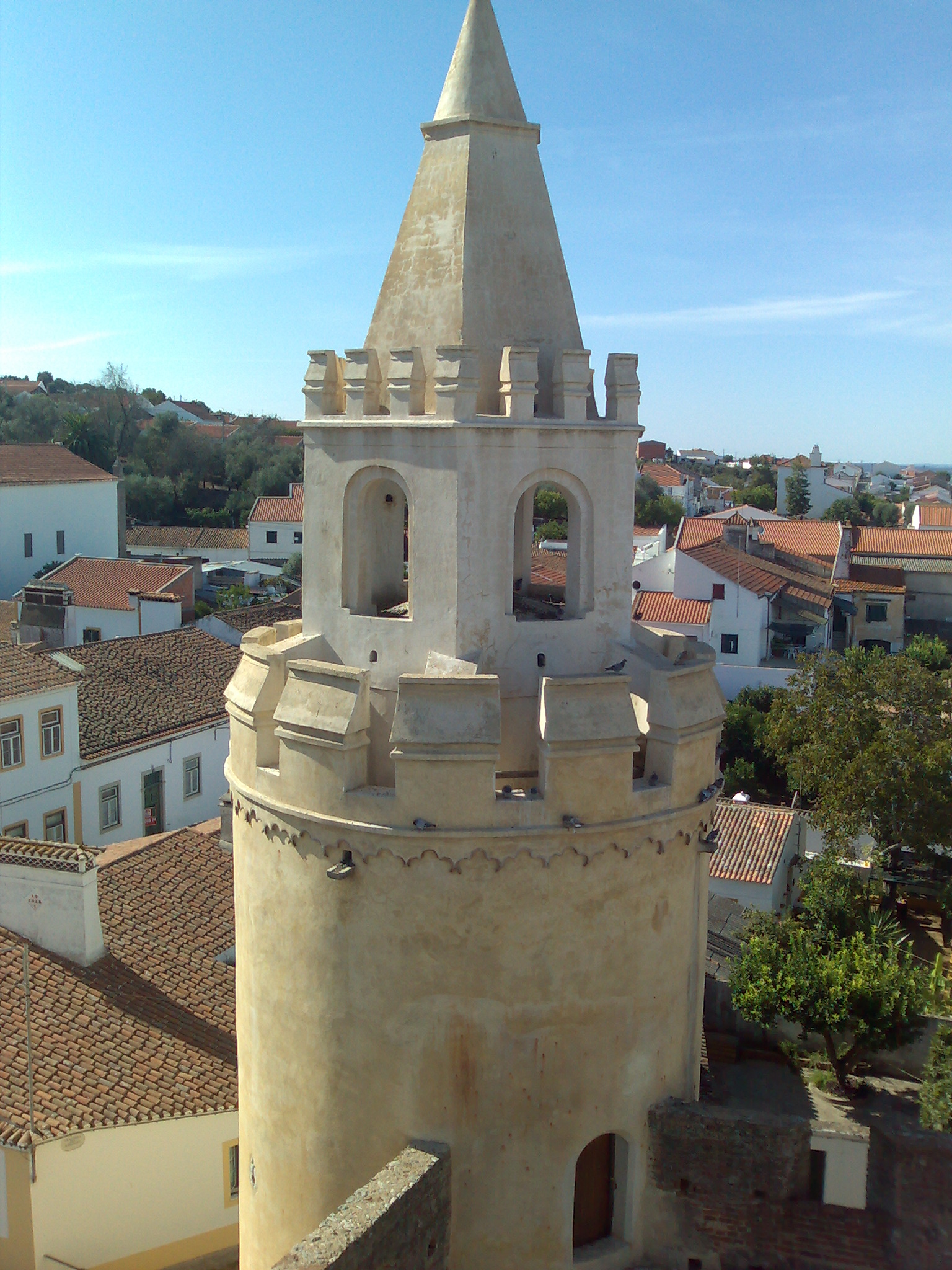
The principal keep tower in the Castle, with more ornate, romanticized representation

The castle was founded in 1313; on establishing a foral (charter) to this village in 1313, King Denis ordered the construction of an encirclement of walls where this town lies, of 400 arms [length] donating 100,000 pounds for the public works. However, the fortification that exists in Viana do Alentejo "..does not match this regal intention regal...and the latest research lean towards the probability that [his subjects had] not gotten around to building it...[therefore] may the Castle of Viana do Alentejo be a work of the late fifteenth or early sixteenth century?

Reference to the completed fortifications occurred in 1490, when the first mention was made to repairs to the walls, battlements and pinnacles.

The DGEMN Direcção Geral dos Edifícios e Monumentos Nacionais (Directorate-General of Buildings and National Monuments) began a process of restoration and refurbishment in 1940, which included repairs to the battlements and walls. A return to this task occurred between 1970 and 1974, and again, in 1976, in addition to repairs to the towers.

Further repairs in 1978 included the execution of new brick masonry bunks, that were knocked down in the garden; consolidation and repair of two towers, with the use of reinforced concrete in one tower that had been split; and plastering in the domes and interior walls.

In 1992, the castle was placed under the management of the IPPAR Instituto Português do Património Arquitectónico (Portruguese Institute for Architectural Patrimony), under decree-law 106F/92, before become the responsibility of the Instituto de Gestão do Património Arquitectónico e Arqueológico ( Institute for the Management of Architectural and Archaeological Heritage).

Between the 2000 and 2005, simply referred to as the Projecto de Conservação, Recuperação e Valorização do Castelo de Viana do Alentejo(Project to Conserve, Recuperate and Valorize the Castle of Viana do Alentejo), was begun to advance an archaeological excavation of the site. During those investigations, a necropolis was discovered, while the walls, churches and cross were cleaned and rehabilitated.

== Architecture ==
The castle is implanted on short rise, in the north flanks of the Serra de Viana, isolated on the periphery of the village of Viana do Alentejo. Within its walls are the parochial church aligned to the south wall, and the Church of the Misericórdia along its northwest wall, while the ancient cross of Viana do Alentejo is located approximately at its center.

The plan is an irregular pentagonal, with its base in the south and pointing to the north, consisting of five walls divided by five cylinderal towers at each vertex. The battlements cover the walls of the structure, of exposed brick alternating with openings and slits for protection. The location of the two churches means that these buildings front their respective walls.

Within these limit were constructed the Manueline-era parochial church (1521), attributed to Diogo de Arruda, an important mastercraftsman in the comarca of the Alentejo at the time. Opposite to this building is the Church of the Misericórdia, also attributed to Arruda around the same time. It served as the municipal offices until the end of the 17th century.
