= Rodrigo Ponce de León =

Rodrigo Ponce de León may refer to:

- Rodrigo Ponce de León, Duke of Cádiz (1443-1492)
- Rodrigo Ponce de León, 4th Duke of Arcos (1602 – 1658)
