= Aleixo de Abreu =

Aleixo de Abreu (Portuguese pronunciation: [ɐˈlɐjʃu ðɨ ɐˈβɾew]; Alcáçovas do Alentejo, Portugal, 1568–Lisbon, Portugal, 1630) was a Portuguese physician and tropical pathologist.

He graduated in Medicine from the University of Coimbra. Due to his notable work as a physician, he was sent to Angola, along with Afonso Furtado de Mendonça, to study the maladies, believed to be endogenous to that land, that seemed to be afflicting the Portuguese sailors.

Having spent 9 years in Angola, Aleixo de Abreu became a recognized expert in the field of African maladies. He wrote extensive studies on scurvy, known at the time in Portugal as "the Angola disease" (Portuguese: mal-de-angola), which were later included in his Treaty of the Seven Maladies (Spanish: Tratado de las Siete Enfermedades), later published in 1623. He later on became the main chamber's physician in king Felipe IV's court.
