= Rodrigo Téllez Girón =

Rodrigo Téllez Girón (1456 or 1458 – Loja, Granada, 14 July 1482), was a Spanish noble and Master of the Order of Calatrava.

== Biography ==
He was the illegitimate son of Pedro Girón Acuña Pacheco, also a Master of the Order and one of the most influential nobles during the reign of Henry IV of Castile.

When his father died in May 1466, he had already —with apostolic authorization— renounced the Mastership in favor of Rodrigo, despite the fact that his son was only 8 or 10 years old. The Order’s commanders, knights, and religious brethren accompanying him, accepted the boy as their Master, a choice later ratified by the membership at the Order's convent in Calatrava.
Spanish historian Marcelino Menéndez y Pelayo attributes this scandalous affair to the lax discipline of the fifteenth century and the anarchy that characterized the reign of Henry IV. In fact, his powerful uncle Juan Pacheco would act as the boy's guardian, maintaining effective control of the Order until he died in 1474.

His uncle had prevented any significant internal protest, but after his death, tensions, that had remained suppressed, now surfaced. When the War of the Castilian Succession broke out in 1475, the Grand Commander, the Clavero, and other knights of the Order sided with Queen Isabella against the orders of Grand Master Rodrigo Téllez Girón, who at that time supported Doña Joanna la Beltraneja.

His troops conquered Ciudad Real, after which he beheaded the city's defenders and tore out the tongues of many inhabitants.. After a series of defeats, he submitted to Isabella and Ferdinand, and recognized Isabel as Queen of Castile.

Now in the service of the Catholic Monarchs, he took part in the initial phase of the Granada War in 1482, but was killed in one of the first engagements, the Siege of Loja.

=== In fiction ===
Rodrigo Téllez Girón is a protagonist in the play Fuenteovejuna by the Spanish playwright Lope de Vega, first published in 1619.

== Sources ==
- Ciudad Ruiz, Manuel (2000). "El maestrazgo de Don Rodrigo Téllez Girón" (PDF). En la España Medieval (23): 321-365. ISSN 0214-3038.
