= Fuenteovejuna =

Spanish play written between 1612 and 1614

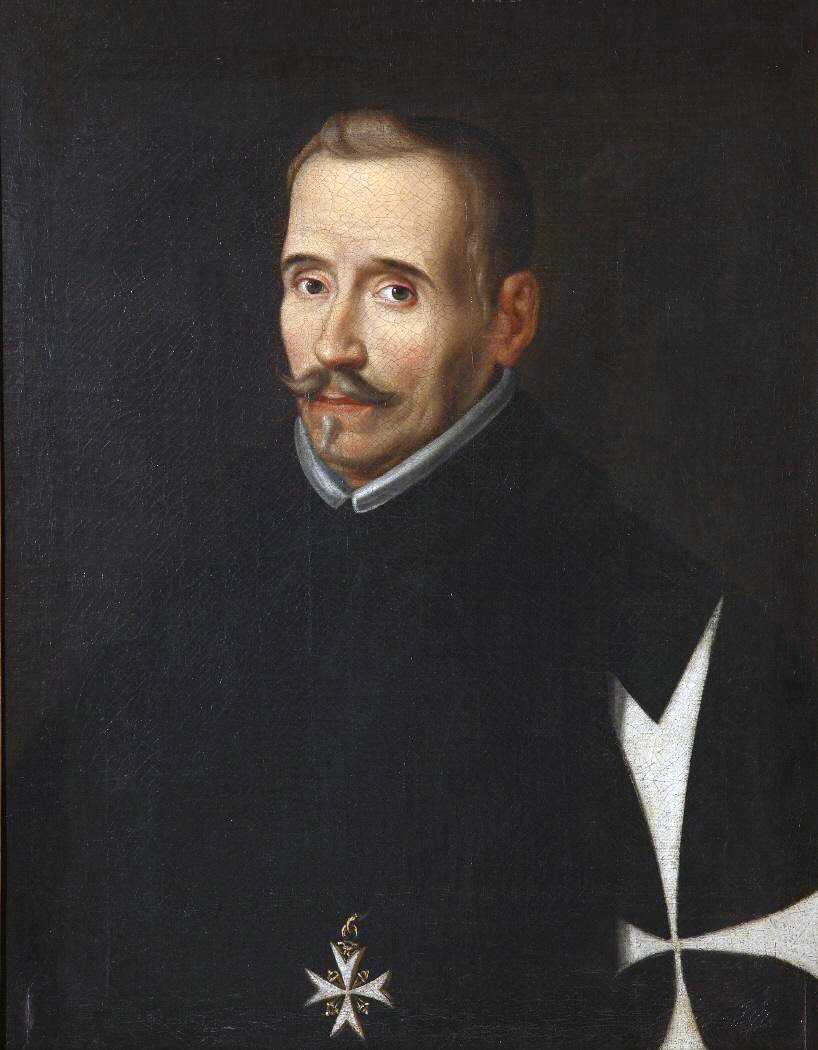
Lope de Vega

Fuenteovejuna (Spanish: [ˌfwenteoβeˈxuna]) is a play by the Spanish playwright Lope de Vega. First published in Madrid in 1619, as part of Docena Parte de las Comedias de Lope de Vega Carpio (Volume 12 of the Collected plays of Lope de Vega Carpio), the play is believed to have been written between 1612 and 1614. The play is based upon a historical incident that took place in the village of Fuenteovejuna in Castile, in 1476. While under the command of the Order of Calatrava, a commander, Fernán Gómez de Guzmán, mistreated the villagers, who banded together and killed him. When a magistrate sent by King Ferdinand II of Aragon arrived in the village to investigate, the villagers, even under the pain of torture, responded only by saying "Fuenteovejuna did it."

The play has often been translated, but its international fame is relatively recent. It was not translated into English until the 1930s.

== Background ==
Rapid change took place in Spain in the years between the historical incident at Fuenteovejuna in 1476 to the writing of Lope's play in 1614. In that time, Spain is united under the Habsburgs and becomes a world superpower with the discovery of the New World. At the time of Lope's writing, Spain was still in the midst of a Siglo de Oro ("Golden Century"), which saw growth in all fields of the arts and academics.

The cross of the Order of Calatrava.

In 1469, seven years before the events at Fuenteovejuna, Princess Isabella I of Castile married Prince Ferdinand II of Aragon. With their marriage, the two major kingdoms of Spain—Castile and Aragon—were joined. This marriage would later ensure the successful completion of the Christian Reconquista of Spain from the Muslim Moors. When Isabella ascended the throne upon the death of her half-brother, Enrique IV, in 1474, Alfonso V of Portugal crossed into Spain in order to secure the throne for Juana, Princess of Castile, the daughter of Enrique. At the Battle of Toro, two years later, Isabella and Ferdinand's forces defeated the forces of Alfonso and Juana.

The same year, Ciudad Real was attacked by knights of the Order of Calatrava under the leadership of its Grand Master, 20-year-old Rodrigo Téllez Girón, who supported the claims to the throne by Alfonso and Juana. The city was of strategic importance due to its location near the border of Castile. It was during this invasion that Commander Gómez de Guzmán was killed by the villagers of Fuenteovejuna after he treated them poorly. After no single guilty party was found, Ferdinand pardoned the villagers from Fuenteovejuna.

== Summary ==
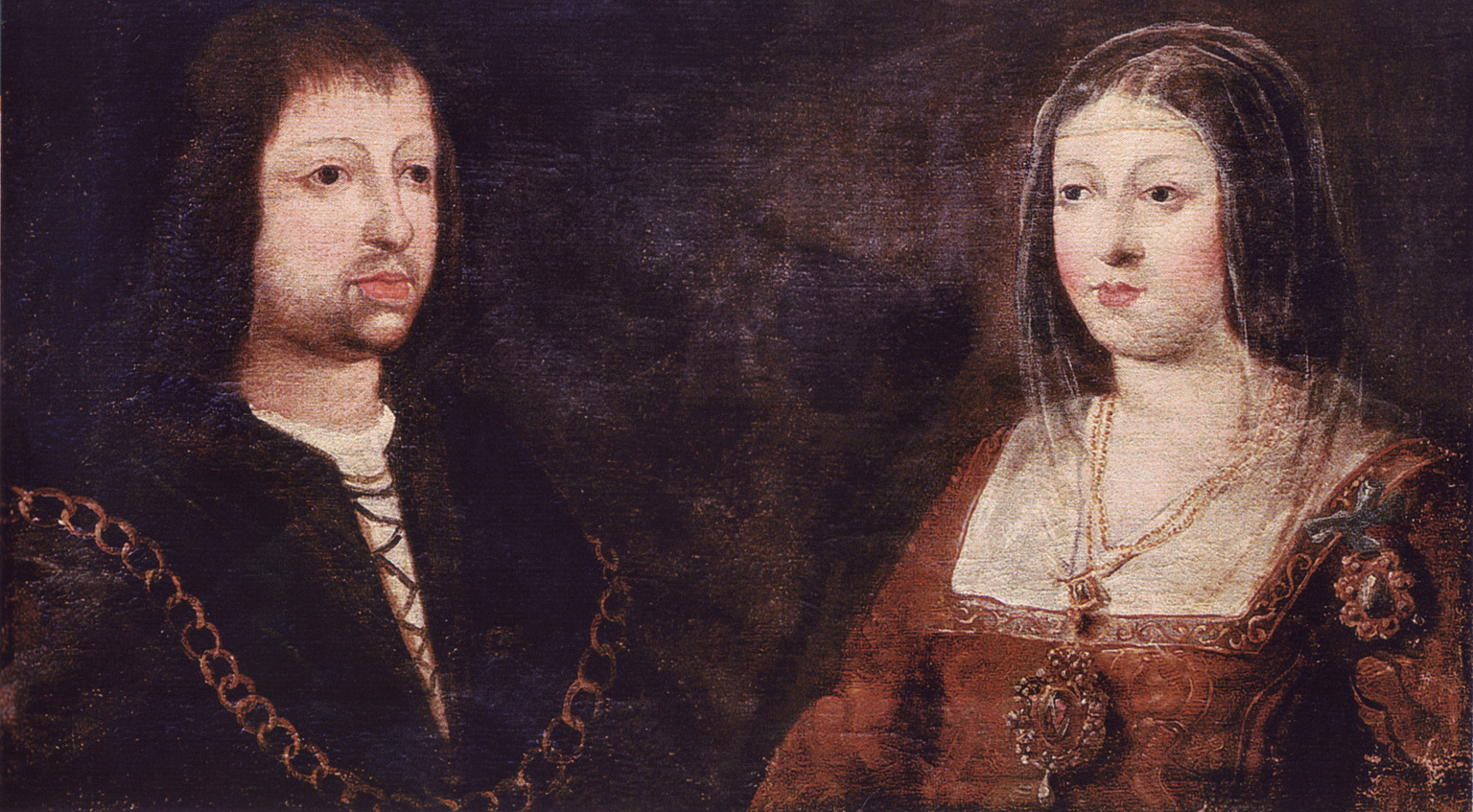
Wedding portrait of Ferdinand and Isabella.

The first act opens in Almagro at the home of the Grand Master of the Order of Calatrava, Rodrigo Téllez Girón. Here, a commander of the order, Fernán Gómez de Guzmán, urges his superior to seize the town of Ciudad Real in the name of Juana and Alfonso of Portugal. Girón decides to capture the city. The village and villagers of Fuenteovejuna are introduced and speak of love. The Commander enters and attempts to take two of the women, Laurencia and Pascuala, back to his castle, but they resist and escape. King Ferdinand and Queen Isabella discuss the capture of Ciudad Real and vow to retake it. Later, two young lovers, Laurencia and Frondoso, meet in the forest. When the Commander approaches, Frondoso hides and watches as the Commander attempts to force himself on Laurencia. As the Commander has put down his crossbow, Frondoso steps out and takes it. As Laurencia escapes his grasp, Frondoso points the crossbow at the Commander, leaving with only the crossbow as the Commander curses both of them.

Act II begins in the village with a discussion among the peasants that is interrupted by the entrance of the Commander. He demands Esteban, Laurencia's father, to allow him to have her but he refuses and the Commander takes this as an insult. A soldier enters and begs the Commander to return to Ciudad Real (Royal City) which has just been surrounded by the forces of Ferdinand and Isabella. After the exit of the Commander, Laurencia and Pascuala go on the run with one of the peasants, Mengo. They are met by another peasant girl, Jacinta, who is being pursued by the Commander's servants. When Mengo protects Jacinta, they are both seized by the Commander's lackeys who will whip Mengo while Jacinta is raped by the Commander and then given to his men. Shortly afterwards, Esteban agrees to allow Laurencia and Frondoso to marry. The wedding proceeds but is interrupted by the Commander who arrests Frondoso, for his threat with the crossbow, as well as Esteban and Laurencia who protest his arrest.

The third act opens with the men of the village meeting to decide how to handle the situation. Laurencia, having been beaten and subject to attempted Droit du seigneur (though she beats off her attackers and escapes) enters, but is not immediately recognized. She reprimands the men for not attempting to rescue her, inspiring the men to kill the Commander. While preparations are being made to hang Frondoso, the band of villagers enters and kills the Commander and one of his servants. Flores, the surviving servant, escapes and rushes to Ferdinand and Isabella to tell what has happened. The shocked rulers order a magistrate to the village to investigate. The villagers, celebrating with the head of the Commander, are told of the magistrate's approach. In order to save themselves, the villagers say "Fuenteovejuna did it". The magistrate proceeds to torture men, women, and young boys on the rack, but gives up after not receiving a satisfactory answer. Ferdinand and Isabella pardon the Grand Master and when the villagers enter and tell their story, they are pardoned as well.

== Themes ==
A conflict of values is the key concept on display. There is an expectation that those who supported their lord would be by this lord protected, not ravaged. The commander, responsible as liege lord under feudal law not to oppress his vassals in exchange for their loyalty, failed to "shelter and protect" those pledged to "help and advise" him. Only as a collective are they able to fight back. However, feudal lord and vassal were bound to mutually respect one another, e.g. the lord could not, by law, beat his vassal, humiliate or lay hands on his wife or daughter. The covenant breakdown undermined the social order.

The value of women and the defense of their honor is another major theme which, when combined with the stirring message regarding male cowardice in fulfilling this duty, brings a striking contrast between the importance of female outcry in striking the match of change and action in the presence of male trepidation. The commander has taken the city as his personal harem. After several maiden rapes and prostituting single and married women of the village alike, he manages to rape Laurencia during her wedding night, which begins his downfall.

It is Laurencia who calls the village men to shame, to set their priorities straight, and to rise against the commander. After the men unite to do so, she rallies the women also to join in taking the lives of the lord and his officers.

An additional theme is subjugation versus obedience. Spain at the time was about to become a global empire. It was undergoing much change per the backdrop of the play. The deaths of the Commander and Ortuño were not mere murders but mutiny against authority – an insurrection against the Crown to which the villagers also aligned themselves as against their oppressive lord.

While Ferdinand and Isabella declined to find the town guilty since they pledged obedience to the Crown of Spain and not to the Prince of Portugal; they struggled with the decision, not pleased to pardon a revolt that was carried out by an insubordinate and brutal mob.

== Recent productions ==
The Soviet ballet Laurencia was based on Fuenteovejuna.

The play has been filmed several times in Spanish and other languages, but never in English. A musical version, called Fuente Ovehuna, was produced in 1972.

Fuenteovejuna was produced as a play in three acts, in English translation by William Colford, at La MaMa Experimental Theatre Club in 1972.

A musical version of the play was produced by the State Theatre of Northern Greece in 1976-77, with music by Thanos Mikroutsikos and lyrics by Yorgos Michaelides.

The play was produced at London's Royal National Theatre in 1989, as adapted by Adrian Mitchell and directed by Declan Donnellan.

Fuenteovejuna was produced at the Stratford Shakespeare Festival in 2008 (see Stratford Festival production history), with Scott Wentworth as the tyrant and Jonathan Goad and Sara Topham as the lovers. The Toronto Globe and Mail gave the production a favorable review.

The Village, directed by Nadia Fall at the Theatre Royal Stratford East is based on the Spanish play. It opened her inaugural season as Artistic Director of Stratford East. This contemporary work is set in India.
