= Joana da Gama =

16th Century Portuguese writer

Joana da Gama (c. 1520–1586) was a Portuguese writer.

== Early life ==
Born in Viana do Alentejo about 1520, Da Gama was the daughter of Manoel do Casco and Filipa da Gama. Through her mother she was a distant relative of the explorer Vasco da Gama.

== Maid of honour ==
Da Gama appears to have entered the court of Catherine of Austria, Queen of Portugal as an enslaved person: a 1543 invoice for clothing refers to her as a slave. Sometime later she was emancipated and served as a free maid of honour in the court.

== Recolhimento do Salvador do Mundo in Évora ==
After marriage, Da Gama moved to Évora. However, her husband died about a year and a half later. She remained in that city. After widowhood, she would have been able to live independently, having possession of a house and a fortune. However, in society at the time it was not acceptable for a woman to live without male guardianship, which explains why many widows went into convents. Thus Da Gama created the Recolhimento (Retreat) do Salvador do Mundo in Évora, to house women who were in a similar situation, although she never came to profess herself as a nun. The body broadly followed the teachings of Saint Francis of Assisi. Gama had expected the support of Henry, King of Portugal, known as the Cardinal-King, but, instead, he ordered the home to be knocked down to make way for an expansion of the College of Jesuit Fathers, instructing the women to live with relatives.

== Writings ==
During the second half of the century, possibly around 1555, she published the work Ditos da Freira - Ditos Diversos Feitos por uma Freira da Terceira Regra, Nos Quais se Contêm Sentenças Mui Notáveis e Avisos Necessários, (Sayings of the Nun - Various Sayings Made by a Nun of the Third Rule, which contain Very Notable Sentences and Necessary Notices), copies of which have survived to the present. The book consists in part of a collection of sayings or aphorisms, alphabetically ordered according to keywords. For example, the entry “Passion” was followed by the phrases “Passion obscures understanding”, “Too much passion corrupts judgment”, and “Great passion tyrannizes the will and robs the landlord of reason.” Such entries provide great insights into the role of women in Portuguese society. Freedom for women in this period, would normally have been only possible for those who were engaged in ecclesiastical life. However, Da Gama, did not choose ecclesiastical life: she chose to create a retreat and live in it according to her own rules. Despite the title of the book, Da Gama herself was never a nun, although she was very pious and has been described as a “secular” nun.

Although this book was published with no indication of the author's name, it was the first original literary work by a Portuguese woman, and it was also the first work of a Portuguese woman to be done through the use of print characters, probably having been elaborated by André de Burgos, in Évora. Apart from being a woman, Da Gama was atypical among sixteenth-century writers. She was neither an aristocrat, despite having noble parents, nor was she close to the power of the Court. She did not have access to high-level instruction, she was not a Latinist, nor had she any great or varied knowledge. She was basically self-taught.

Joana da Gama died on 21 September 1586 and was buried at the Church of the Misericórdia of Évora.
