= Castle of Portel =

Medieval castle in Portugal

Coordinates: 38.3092°N 7.7027°W

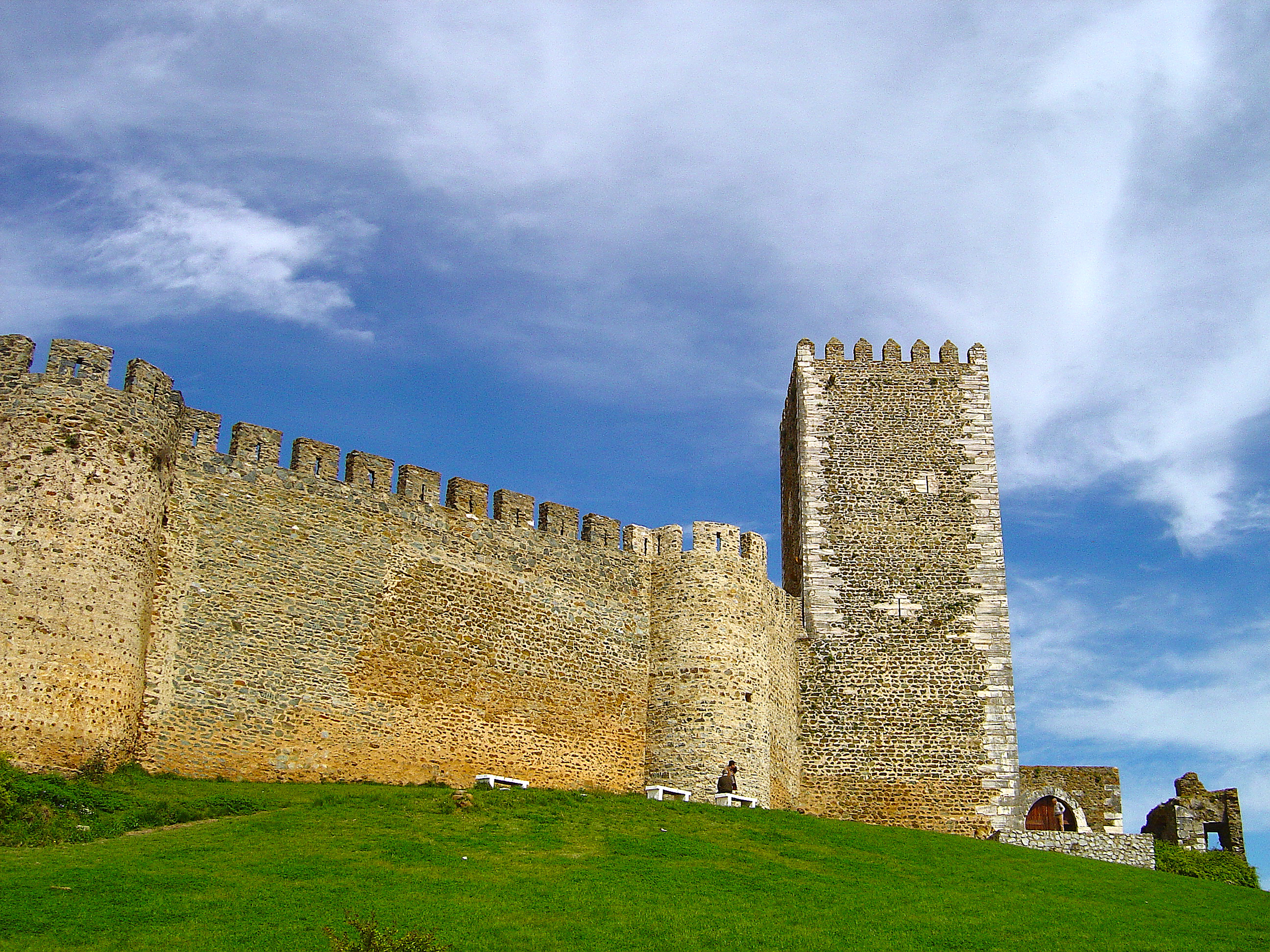
A view of the castle in the town of Portel, Alentejo, Portugal

The Castle of Portel (Portuguese: Castelo de Portel) is a medieval castle located in the municipality of Portel in the district of Evora in Portugal.

== History ==
=== Middle ages ===
Construction was started during the reign of King Denis (1279–1325).

In the context of the 1383–1385 Portuguese Interregnum crisis, Fernão Gonçalves de Sousa, mayor of Portel, took the sides with the Kingdom of Castile, and for fear of the residents rebelling, took their weapons to all and put them in the castle. In November 1384, the development of the Alentejo campaign by the forces of the Constable D. Nuno Alvares Pereira, a cleric of Portel, name John Matthew, opened them the village doors, facilitating the achievement of settlement and surrender the castle. When the crisis was over, the land was donated back to the House of Braganza. Later, under the reign of King Manuel I, the town and its castle are figured by Duarte de Armas (Book of Fortresses, c. 1509). At that time the castle was remodeled structure giving way to the Palace of the Dukes of Braganza and a barbican (1510), getting the works in charge of the architect-royal Francisco de Arruda, for instance D. Jaime, Duke of Braganza.

=== 20th century to modern era ===
Lost its defensive function, away from border and the main access roads to the Alentejo region, the castle was gradually abandoned until becoming ruins in the nineteenth century.

In the early twentieth century, the whole was classified as a National Monument by decree, published on 23 June 1910. The intervention of the government was felt on time, in 1938, at the initiative of the Directorate General for National Buildings and Monuments (DGEMN).

Property of the House of Braganza Foundation, the degradation of the whole continued to progress until the collapse of a cylindrical tower of the palace and, more recently, in February 1998, a wall portion adjacent to the donjon, an element that had been the subject of intervention in the 1980s the new intervention took place in 1999, in charge of DGEMN through its Regional Directorate South, based on traditional building techniques. The set awaits, however, a comprehensive plan of research and musealization.

== Architecture ==
The castle in the Gothic style, has pentagonal plant reinforced by circular plan towers at the corners. Its shape, novelty in the Portuguese military architecture at the time, seems to have been inspired by the Château d'Angers, France. It is dominated post an imposing donjon of quadrangular plant, which stands at about twenty-five meters high, divided internally into two floors above the parapet line, both covered by rib vault warhead. The lower floor served as a prison. the marble in the wedges and the Gothic windows was used. The access door to the tower is in warhead. This tower protects the access gate to the north, in pointed arch. On the south side, the Beja gate determines an internal road axis in a straight line connecting the two ports. The set has three doors, including the Clock Gate and Outeiro door. In the main square opens up a cistern and can identify the remains of the Chapel of Saint Vincent and the ruins of a palace. The medieval village about, did not survive to us. The defense of the castle was complemented by a barbican, that are conserved still important sections in the south, north and west, composed of curtain reinforced by turrets of quadrangular. It is this Barbican rebuilt by King Manuel I, which corresponds to Gothic door surmounted by overlapping real coats.
