= Siege of Loja =

Siege of Loja (1482)
- Part of the Spanish Reconquista and Granada War
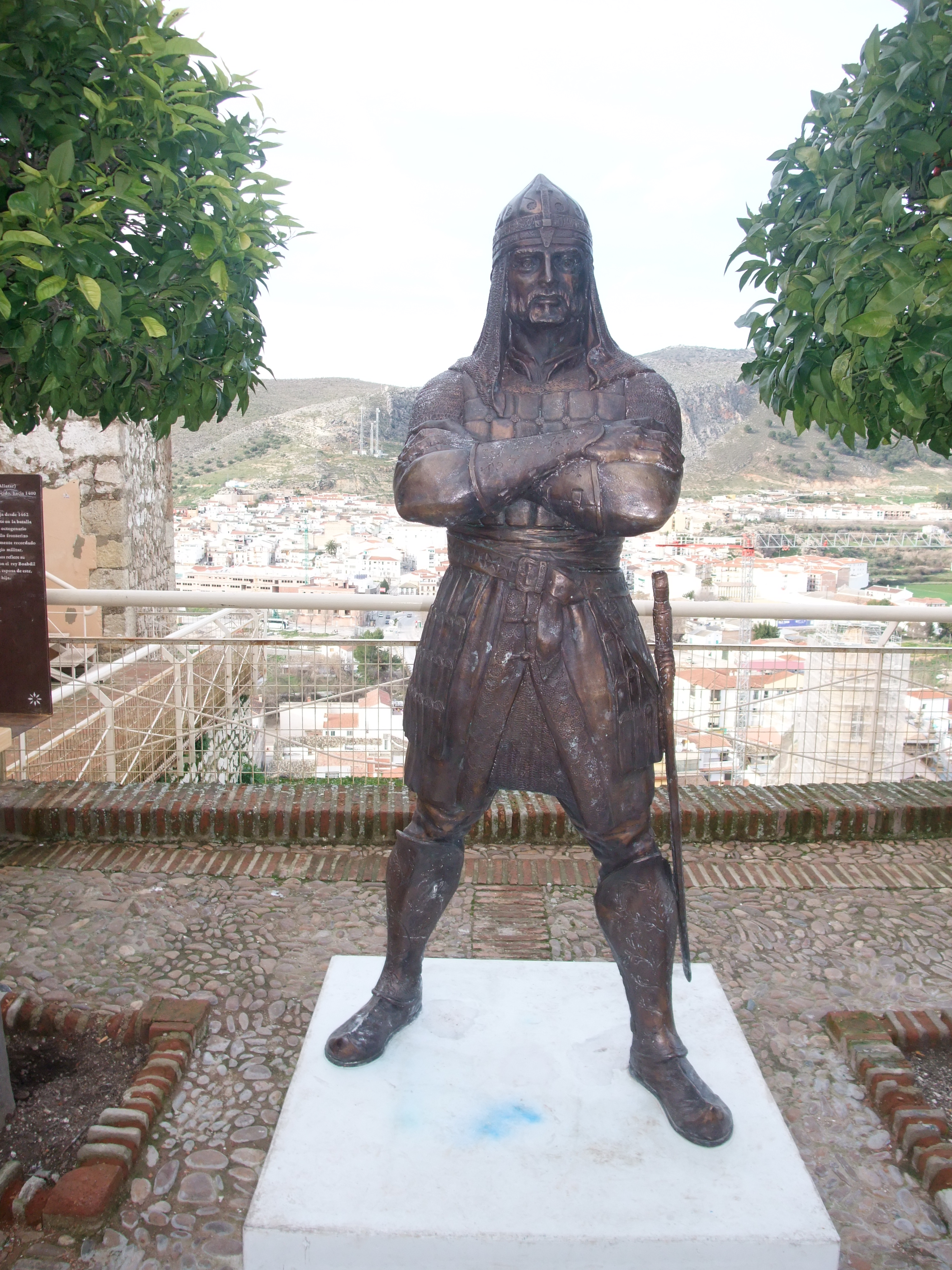
- Alial-Attar, the general who defeated the Spanish at Loja in 1482
Date	1–4 July 1482
Location	Loja, Granada, Spain
Result	Granadan victory

Belligerents
Crown of Castile; Crown of Aragon	Emirate of Granada

Commanders and leaders
Ferdinand II of Aragon	Ali al-Attar

Strength
4,000 cavalry 12,000 infantry	3,000 men

Casualties and losses
Very heavy	Unknown

The siege of Loja was a military engagement between the Spanish Catholic Monarchs who besieged the city and the Granadan garrison of Loja. The siege ended in disaster for the Spanish, who retreated after suffering heavy losses.

== Background ==
After the capture of Alhama de Granada, the Castilian queen Isabella I did not allow rest for her troops. The Spanish queen looked for the city of Loja; capturing it would provide great spoils for the troops. The fortress of Loja was positioned on top of a mountain that overlooked the cultivated valley, protected by a river from the suburbs of Granada. A single bridge was the only path to the fort. The fortress was well fortified and well supplied. The Sultan of Granada, aware of the fall of Alhama, garrisoned the fort with 3,000 of his best men, led by an experienced warrior, Ali Al-Attar.

The husband of Isabella, Ferdinand II of Aragon, began making preparations for Loja. He mustered an army of 4,000 cavalry and 12,000 infantry. The cities and forts showed delay when delivering men and supplies to Ferdinand. Some of Ferdinand's counselors advised against Loja, but Ferdinand was eager for a war.

== Siege ==
Ferdinand marched from Écija and arrived at the banks of Loja on July 1st, 1482. The Spanish encamped in the hills, whose deep ravines blocked communications in the army, while the valley proved unfavorable to the men-at-arms. Ferdinand's brother advised him to build a bridge to cross the river lower down the stream to get to the other side, but the king overruled him. A large body of Spanish were sent to occupy the high position and fortify it to harass the city. This was initiated by the Marquises of Cadiz and Villena and the Grand Master of Calatrava.

Before any works were completed, Ali, seeing what was happening, sent troops to dislodge the Spanish. The Spanish, seeing the sortie, left their works and chased the Granadans. They, however, made a feigned retreat while the Spanish pursued them. Away from the redoubt, the Spanish were ambushed. Too late to respond, the Spanish retreated as quickly as possible; however, the Spanish found themselves attacked by two Granadan divisions. The battle lasted for an hour and ended with the retreat of Granadans when Spanish reinforcements arrived, but only after the Spanish suffered heavy losses. The Grand Master of Calatrava, Rodrigo Tellez Giron, was killed in the battle.

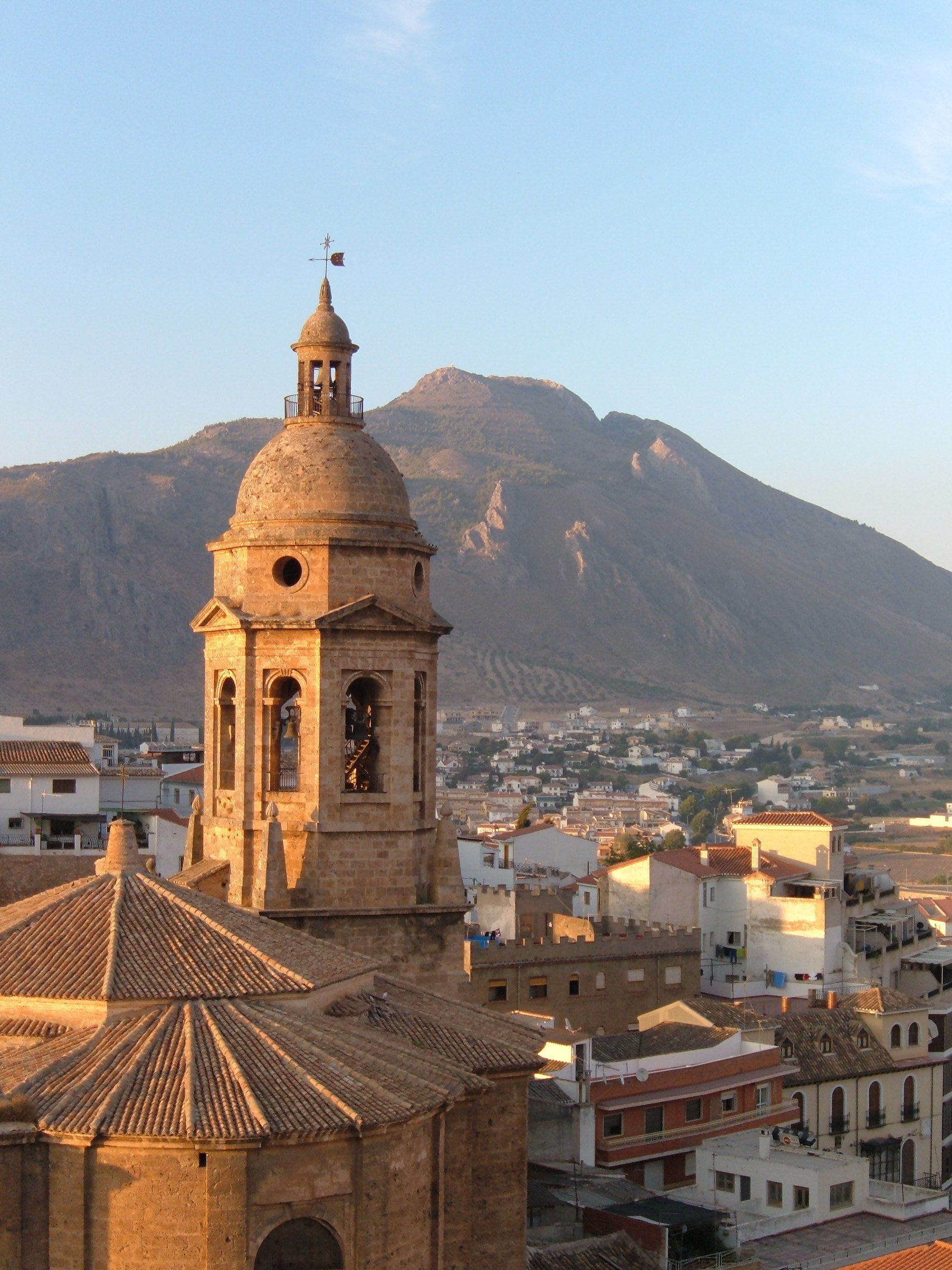
Loja Mountain

Ferdinand was now convinced of his bad position. His men were exhausted and began deserting in large numbers. The majority of them are new recruits. He ordered a retreat, hoping to receive more reinforcements to impose the siege effectively. On the 4th of July, Ferdinand issued the troops at the heights to break their camps and join with the main body. Soon after they began retreating, the Granadans launched a sortie to take the occupied positions. The Spanish, seeing their comrades descending, thought that they were surprised by the Moors and routed. Panic struck the camp, and the troops began retreating in disorder.

The Granadans, seeing what was happening, rushed to attack the Spanish. The Granadans began cutting down the Spanish from all sides, inflicting heavy losses, and chased them six leagues from Loja. Ferdinand, however, remained calm and rushed towards the massacre with a body of cavalry to cover the retreat. Ferdinand succeeded in compelling the Granadans to retreat after the battle. Ferdinand continued his retreat. Had Ferdinand not remained calm, the Spanish army would've been completely destroyed.

== Aftermath ==
The Spanish suffered heavy losses during the campaign, including the loss of baggage and artillery. The Queen Isabella was deeply saddened by the news of this defeat. Despite the great victory, division between the Granadans began, which proved advantageous to the Spanish.

== Sources ==
- William Hickling Prescott (1868), History of the Reign of Ferdinand and Isabella, the Catholic.
- Jean Baptiste Rosario (1897), Isabella the Catholic, Queen of Spain, Her Life, Reign, and Times, 1451-1504.
- Henry Edward Watts (1901), The Christian Recovery of Spain, Being the Story of Spain from the Moorish Conquest to the Fall of Granada (711-1492 A.d.).
