= Rodrigo Ponce de León, Duke of Cádiz =

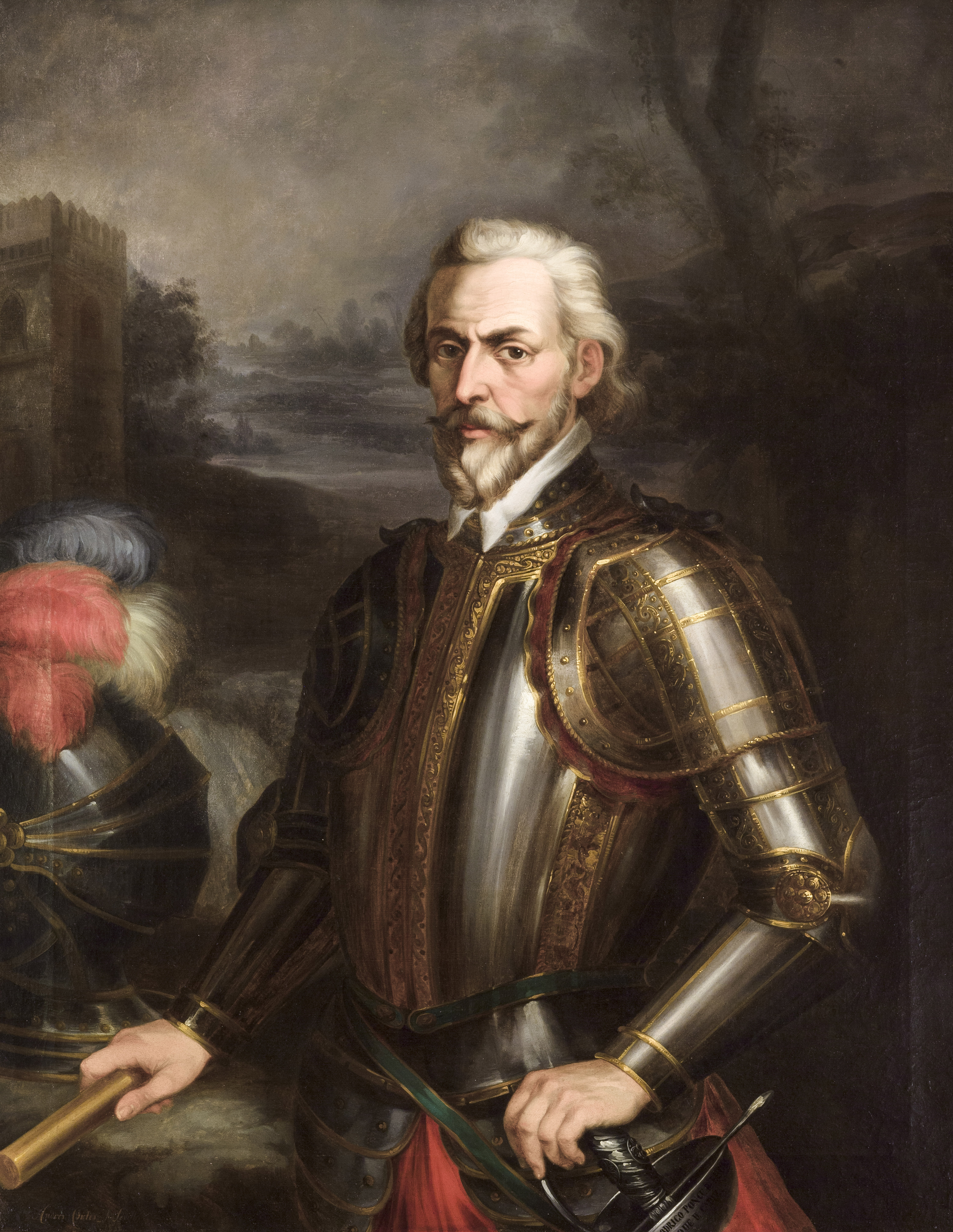
1856 portrait at the City Council of Seville

Rodrigo Ponce de Leon, Duke of Cádiz (1443– 27 August 1492), 3rd Count of Arcos, 1st Marquis of Zahara, was one of the Castilian military leaders in the conquest of Granada (1482-1492).

== Biography ==
He was the second son of Juan Ponce de León, 2nd Count of Arcos, and his second wife, Leonor Núñez. Young Rodrigo’s life changed drastically following the death of his older brother, Pedro, in 1459, an event that made him the heir to the family estate.

From his early youth, Rodrigo became a key support to his father in managing the family estates and defending the frontier. In 1462, he distinguished himself for the first time, by leading of the Count’s forces at the Battle of Madroño, near Teba, where he routed a major raiding party commanded by the Granadan prince Muley Hacen. Rodrigo, gaining his first combat experience, fought with great valor and resolve, sustaining a severe arm wound in the process. In 1462, he played an important role in the Conquest of Gibraltar.

In 1465, he supported Alfonso, Prince of Asturias in his rebellion against King Henry IV of Castile, and he seized Cádiz, which he subsequently governed as his personal property. In the War of the Castilian Succession (1475-1479), he first supported Joanna la Beltraneja, but after a series of defeats, he submitted to Isabella and Ferdinand, and recognized Isabel as Queen of Castile.

=== Granada War (1482-1492) ===
The Marquis of Cádiz was one of the principal military commander of the Granada War. Hs knowledge of the terrain and his numerous contacts within the Muslim camp made him an especially valuable and astute advisor. He participated in virtually every campaign of the war.

In February 1482, he led the Castilian forces that captured the town of Alhama de Granada. In March 1483, he was defeated in the Battle of Axarquía, but played a leading role in the victorious Battle of Lopera that October. This success was crucial, as it shattered the power of the Moors of Ronda and Málaga and paved the way for Rodrigo Ponce de León to immediately reconquer Zahara (29 October 1483). The impact of this victory was profound. It so pleased the Monarchs that they granted him the town as a hereditary fiefdom, elevated his Marquisate of Cádiz to a Dukedom, and added the title of Marquis of Zahara to his honors.

On 22 May 1485, he conquered Ronda and its mountainous hinterland, followed by the capture of Málaga in 1487. Although his health began to decline around 1488, this did not prevent him from being present from start to finish during the grueling siege of Baza (June–December 1489) and the surrenders of Almería, Guadix and finally Granada itself (2 January 1492). He died 7 months later, aged 48.

=== Marriage and children ===
He was first married with Beatriz de Marmolejo, Lady of Torrijos, but the marriage was subsequently annulled. He later married a second time to Beatriz Pacheco, daughter of Juan Pacheco, 1st Marquess of Villena, and María Portocarrero. He had no offspring from either of his marriages, and therefore no legitimate heirs.

But Rodrigo had three daughters from a relationship with Inés de la Fuente, an unmarried woman, which were born prior to his marriage to Beatriz Pacheco and later legitimized.

- Francisca Ponce de León y de la Fuente, his heiress. Married to Luis Ponce de León y Figueroa. Their eldest son became the 1st Duke of Arcos and 2nd Marquis of Zahara.
- María Ponce de León y de la Fuente, married to Rodrigo Messía Carrillo, had issue.
- Leonor Ponce de León y de la Fuente, wife of Francisco Enríquez de Ribera, no issue.

=== In Literature and fiction ===
- Roderigo Ponce de Leon, marques of Cadiz is written about extensively in Washington Irving's Chronicle of the Conquest of Granada, published 1829.
- He was a character in the Spanish TV series Isabel (2012-2014), played by Fernando Soto.

== Sources ==
- Harold Livermore. A History of Spain. New York: Grove Press, 1958. p. 192.
- Thomas Hugh . Rivers of Gold, the Rise of the Spanish Empire . Weidenfeld & Nicolson, 2003

Spanish nobility
Preceded by New creation	Duke of Cádiz; 1st creation 1484–1492	Succeeded by Francisca Ponce de León
