= Viana do Alentejo =

- Municipality
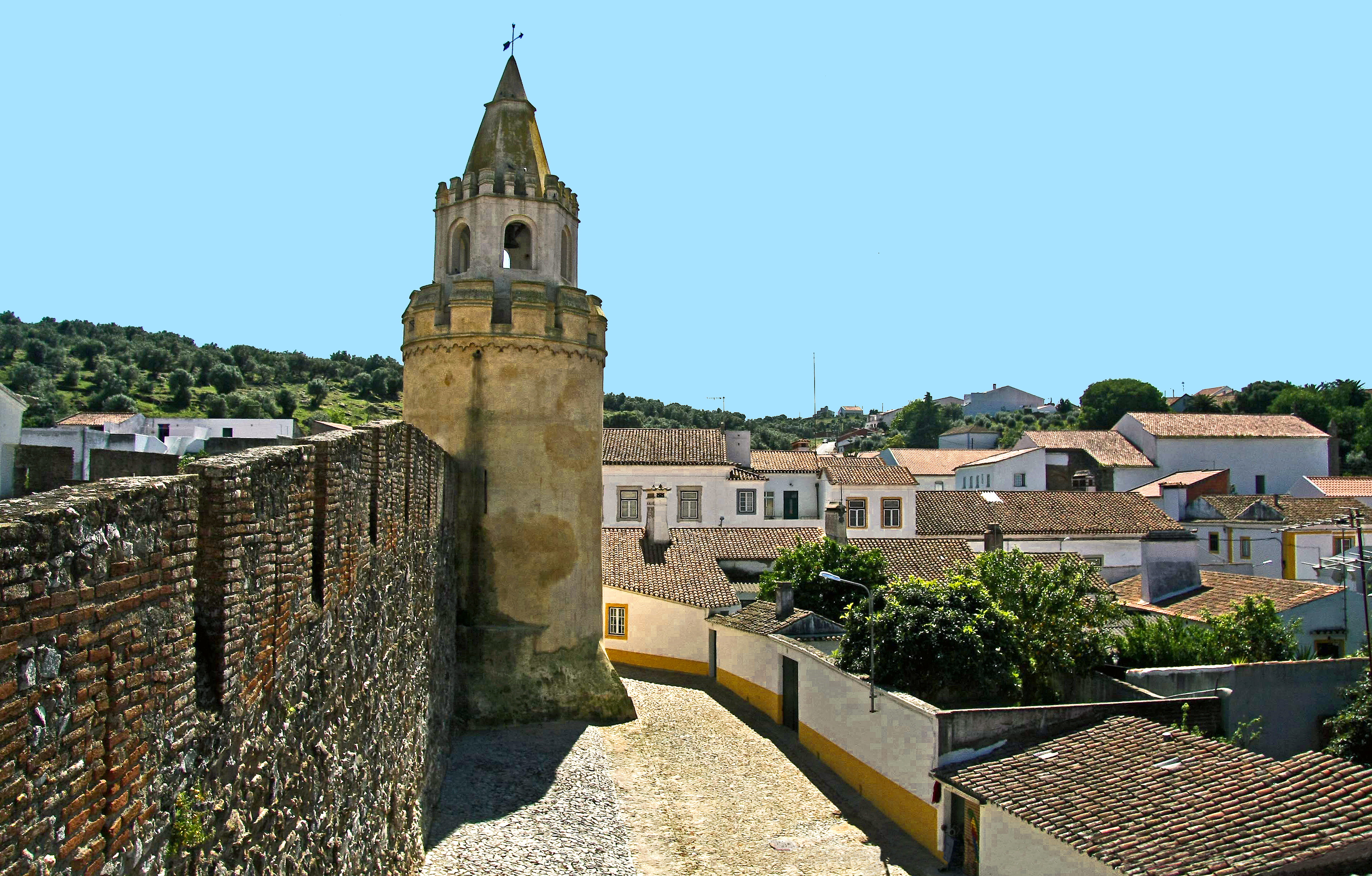
- The Castle of Viana do Alentejo contemplating the town

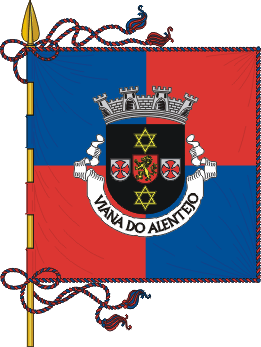
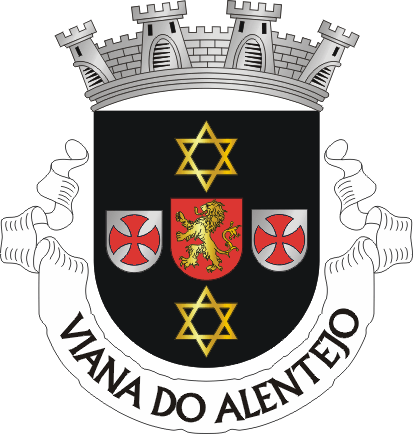
- Flag Coat of arms
- Interactive map of Viana do Alentejo
- Coordinates: 38°17′N 7°59′W
- Country: Portugal
- Region: Alentejo
- Intermunic. comm.: Alentejo Central
- District: Évora
- Parishes: 3

Government
  - President: Luís Metrogos (PS)

Area
  - Total: 393.67 km^{2} (152.00 sq mi)

Population (2011)
  - Total: 5,743
  - Density: 14.59/km^{2} (37.78/sq mi)
- Time zone: UTC+00:00 (WET)
  - Summer (DST): UTC+01:00 (WEST)
- Local holiday: January 13
- Website: www.cm-vianadoalentejo.pt

Viana do Alentejo (pronounced [viˈɐnɐ ðu ɐlẽˈtɛʒu]) is a municipality in the District of Évora in Portugal. The population in 2011 was 5,743, in an area of 393.67 km^{2}.

The present Mayor is Bernardino Bengalinha Pinto, elected by the Socialist Party. The municipal holiday is January 13.

== Climate ==
Viana do Alentejo has a Mediterranean climate (Köppen: Csa) with mild, rainy winters and hot to very hot, dry summers.

Climate data for Viana do Alentejo (1991-2020), extremes (1981-present) (with 2003 record high), altitude: 202 m (663 ft)
| Month | Jan | Feb | Mar | Apr | May | Jun | Jul | Aug | Sep | Oct | Nov | Dec | Year |
|---|---|---|---|---|---|---|---|---|---|---|---|---|---|
| Record high °C (°F) | 23.8 (74.8) | 25.2 (77.4) | 30.0 (86.0) | 35.7 (96.3) | 39.2 (102.6) | 44.0 (111.2) | 45.0 (113.0) | 47.0 (116.6) | 43.0 (109.4) | 36.5 (97.7) | 28.6 (83.5) | 25.0 (77.0) | 47.0 (116.6) |
| Mean daily maximum °C (°F) | 14.7 (58.5) | 16.3 (61.3) | 19.5 (67.1) | 21.5 (70.7) | 25.7 (78.3) | 30.7 (87.3) | 34.3 (93.7) | 34.4 (93.9) | 30.2 (86.4) | 24.5 (76.1) | 18.5 (65.3) | 15.4 (59.7) | 23.8 (74.9) |
| Daily mean °C (°F) | 9.8 (49.6) | 10.8 (51.4) | 13.4 (56.1) | 15.1 (59.2) | 18.4 (65.1) | 22.1 (71.8) | 24.8 (76.6) | 25.1 (77.2) | 22.3 (72.1) | 18.4 (65.1) | 13.4 (56.1) | 10.6 (51.1) | 17.0 (62.6) |
| Mean daily minimum °C (°F) | 4.9 (40.8) | 5.3 (41.5) | 7.3 (45.1) | 8.7 (47.7) | 11.1 (52.0) | 13.7 (56.7) | 15.3 (59.5) | 15.8 (60.4) | 14.5 (58.1) | 12.2 (54.0) | 8.3 (46.9) | 5.9 (42.6) | 10.3 (50.4) |
| Record low °C (°F) | −5.7 (21.7) | −4.5 (23.9) | −3.2 (26.2) | 0.6 (33.1) | 2.7 (36.9) | 6.2 (43.2) | 9.0 (48.2) | 8.7 (47.7) | 4.7 (40.5) | 0.5 (32.9) | −2.0 (28.4) | −4.2 (24.4) | −5.7 (21.7) |
| Average precipitation mm (inches) | 61.7 (2.43) | 47.6 (1.87) | 49.9 (1.96) | 53.1 (2.09) | 37.2 (1.46) | 11.3 (0.44) | 1.4 (0.06) | 3.5 (0.14) | 24.9 (0.98) | 66.9 (2.63) | 75.5 (2.97) | 69.2 (2.72) | 502.2 (19.75) |
| Average precipitation days (≥ 1 mm) | 12.0 | 10.4 | 7.3 | 10.1 | 7.0 | 2.7 | 0.6 | 1.0 | 5.0 | 11.2 | 11.8 | 14.5 | 93.6 |
Source: IPMA (precipitation days 1981-2010)

== Parishes ==
Administratively, the municipality is divided into 3 civil parishes (freguesias):

- Aguiar
- Alcáçovas
- Viana do Alentejo

== Notable residents ==
Notable people from Viana do Alentejo include:

- Joana da Gama (c.1520 – 1586) a Portuguese writer.
- Duarte Lobo (ca.1565 – 1646) a Portuguese composer.
- Aleixo de Abreu (1568–1630) a Portuguese physician and tropical pathologist.
- António Francisco Cardim (1596–1659) a Jesuit priest, missionary and historian in the Far East.
- António Banha (1941-2011) actor.

== Twin towns ==
Viana do Alentejo is twinned with:

- Igarassu, Brazil
- Porto Seguro, Brazil
- Viana, Brazil

== Gallery ==
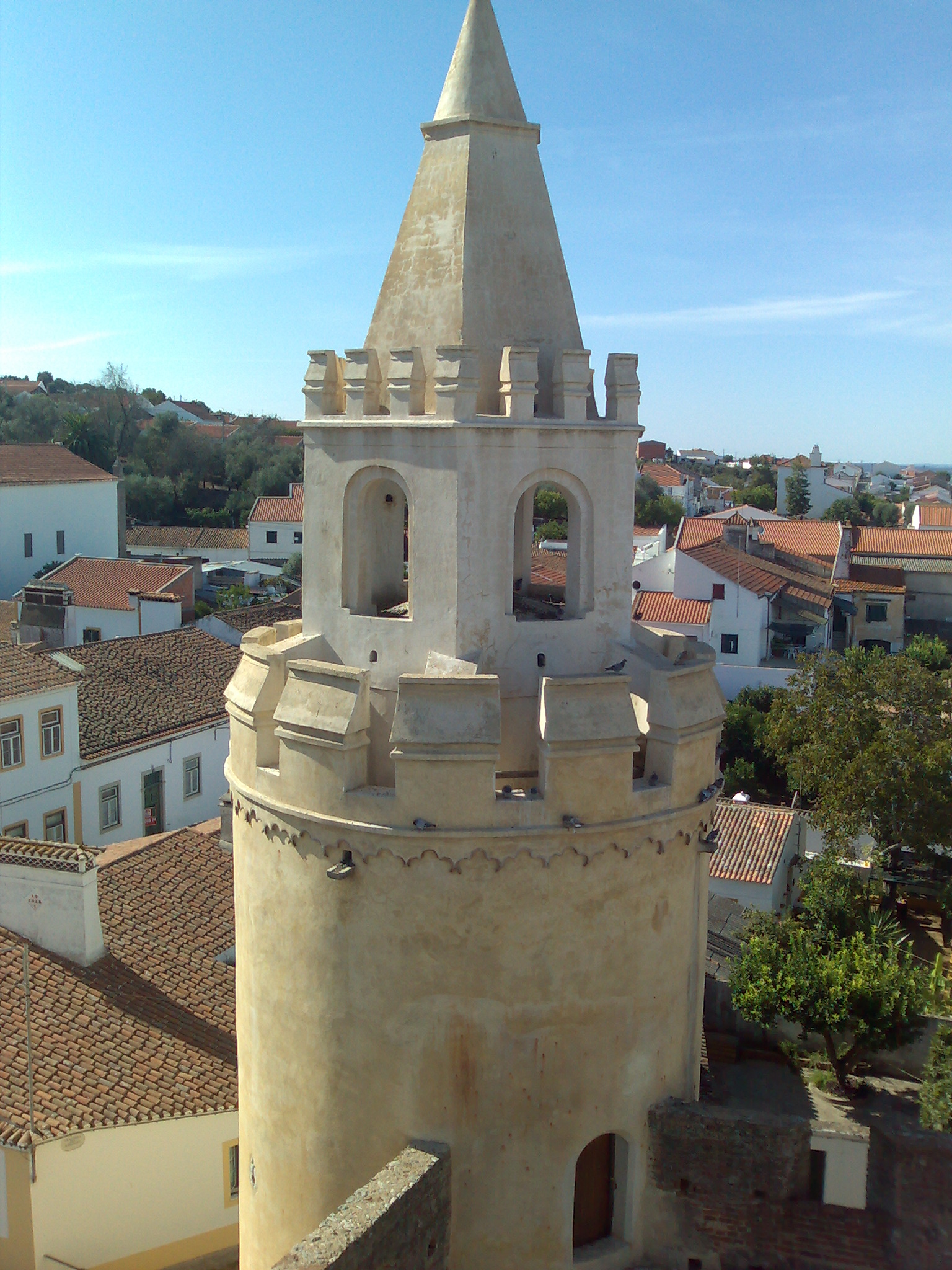
The Castle of Viana do Alentejo with the city below

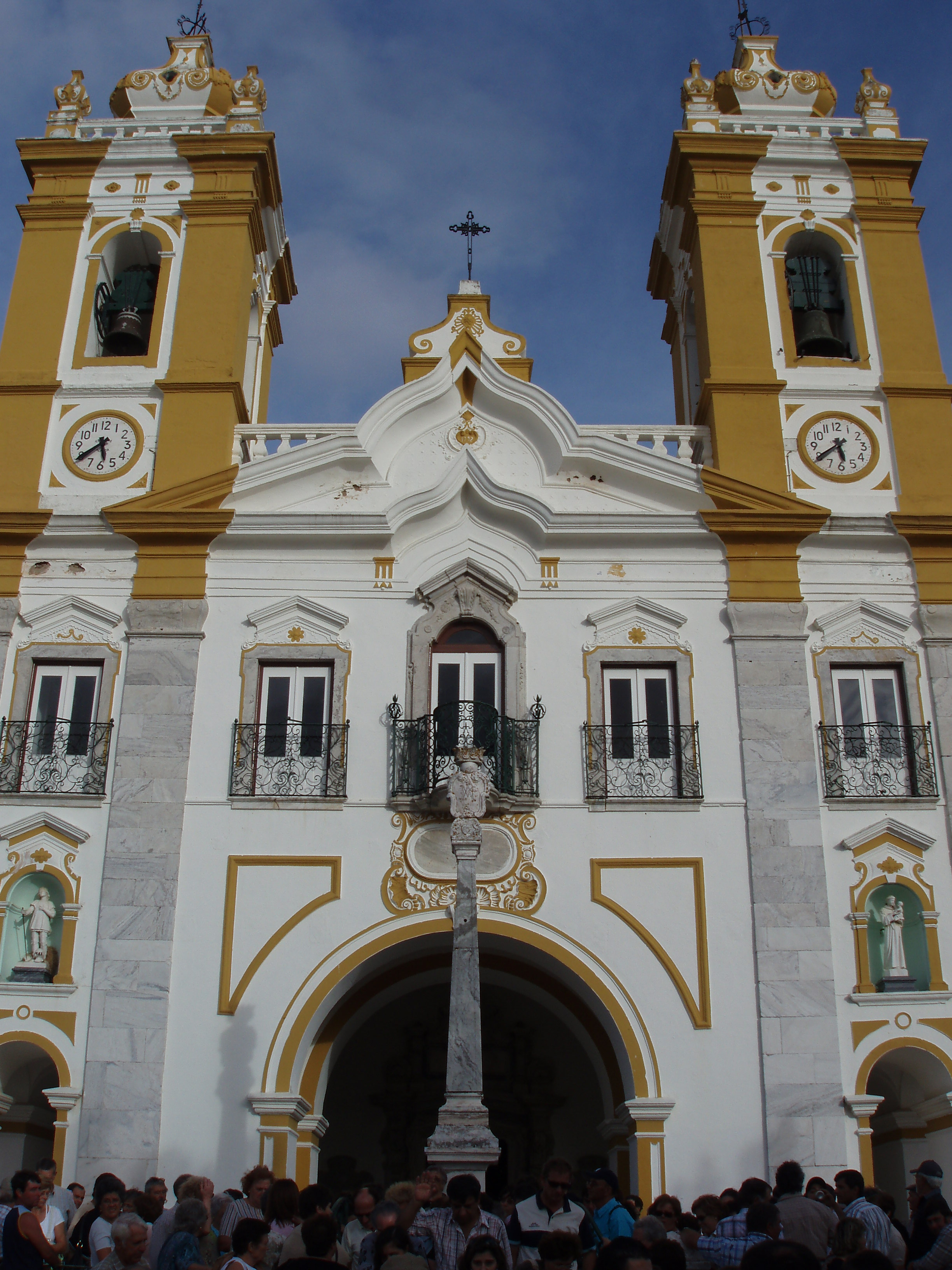
The local Senhora d'Aires Church in Viana do Alentejo
