= Duratón =

Duratón can refer to:

- Duratón, Segovia, the site of a Romanesque church.
- Duratón (river), a river in Spain
- Hoces del Río Duratón Natural Park (Parque Natural de las Hoces del Río Duratón).
