= Frutos =

Frutos is the Spanish word for "fruits". It may refer to:

Given name

- Frutos, a Castilian hermit and saint
- Frutos Baeza, a Spanish poet
- Frutos Feo, a Spanish sprinter

Other

- Doctor Juan Manuel Frutos, a Paraguayan town in Caaguazú Department
- Don Frutos Gómez, a 1961 Argentine film directed by Rubén W. Cavallotti
- Frutos, a surname

== See also ==
- Fruto (disambiguation)
- Fructus (disambiguation)
