= Fructus =

Fructus is a Latin word meaning fruit. It may refer to:

- Fructus (Roman law), a legal term
- Fructus naturales, natural fruits of the land, in property law
- Saint Fructus (died 715), Spanish saint

== See also ==
- Fructose, a sugar found in many plants
- Fructuosus (died 259), Christian saint, bishop, and martyr
- Fruit
- Fruto (disambiguation)
- Frutos (disambiguation)
