= Duratón River Gorges Natural Park =

Coordinates: 41.3167°N 3.86667°W

- IUCN category V (protected landscape/seascape)
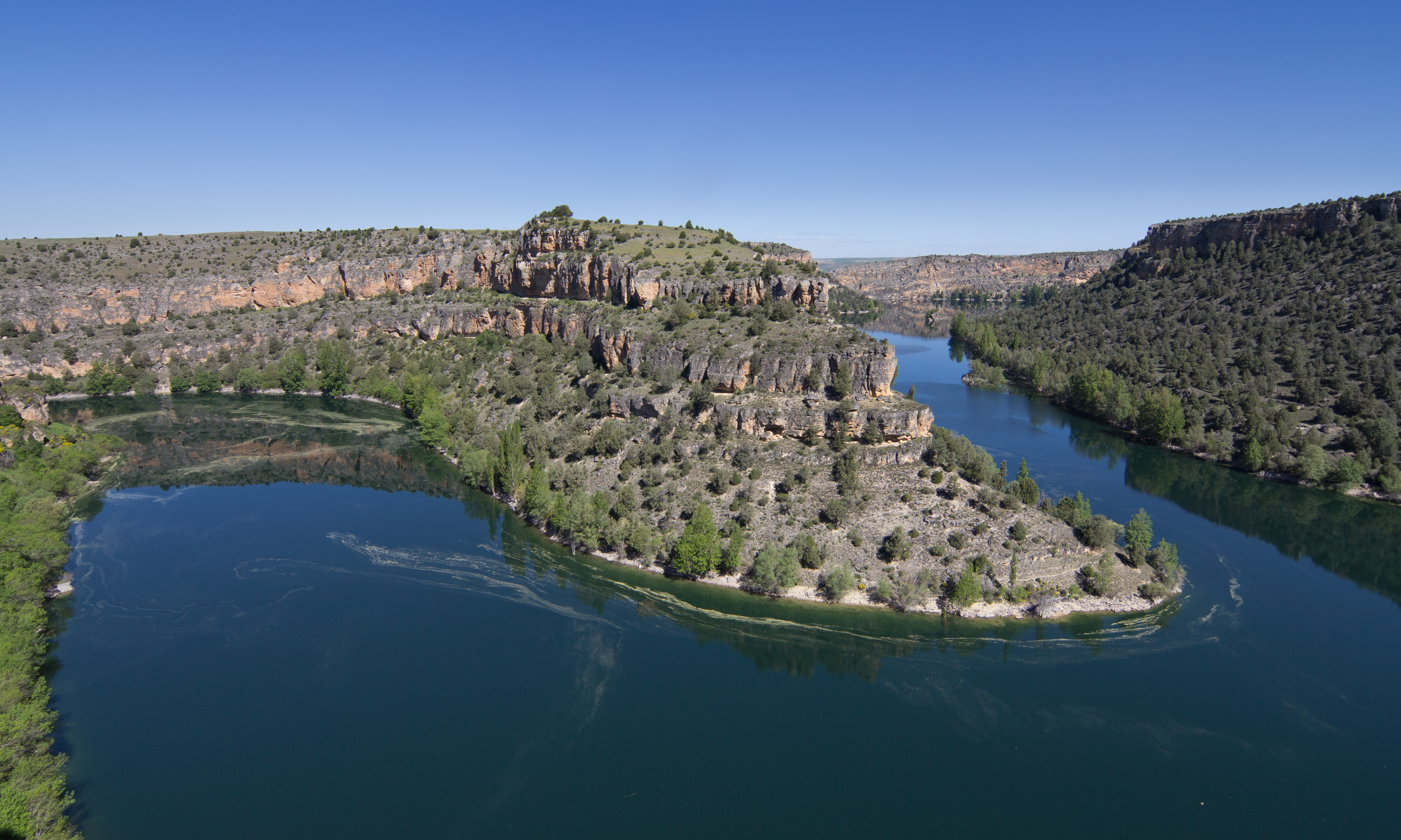
- View of a part of the gorge
- Interactive map of Duratón River Gorges Natural Park
- Location: Castilla y León, Spain
- Nearest city: Sepúlveda, Segovia
- Established: 1989

Duratón River Gorges Natural Park (Spanish: Parque Natural de las Hoces del Río Duratón) is a natural park of 5,037 hectares (12,450 acres), 1.2 kilometres (0.75 mi) west of Sepúlveda, Segovia, Castile and León, Spain. The park contains a series of 100 metres (330 ft) high gorges that were formed by the Duratón River.

Saint Fructus (San Frutos) established himself here as a hermit in the 8th century; a monastery dedicated to him also exists within the park.

The park surrounds the pre-existing villages of Sepúlveda, Sebúlcor, and Carrascal del Río.

It is home to a population of griffon vultures, along with Egyptian vultures, common kestrels, and peregrine falcons.
