= Carrascal (surname) =

Carrascal is a Spanish surname. Notable people with the surname include:

- José María Carrascal (1930–2023), Spanish journalist and writer
- José María Moreno Carrascal (born 1951), Spanish poet, translator, and teacher
- Jorge Carrascal (born 1998), Colombian professional footballer
- Marco Carrascal (born 2003), Spanish professional footballer
- Rafael Carrascal (born 1992), Colombian professional footballer

== See also ==
- Carrascal (disambiguation), several places
