= Frutos (surname) =

Frutos is a Spanish surname. Notable people with the surname include:

- Alexandre Frutos, French football player
- Alexis Frutos Vaesken, Paraguayan diplomat
- Francisco Frutos, Spanish politician
- Javier de Frutos, Venezuelan choreographer
- Juan Manuel Frutos, President of Paraguay
- Nicanor Duarte Frutos, President of Paraguay
- Nicolás Frutos, Argentine football player
- Noelia Frutos, Spanish politician
- Pilar Frutos, Paraguayan team handball player
