= Juan Gil de Hontañón =

Spanish master builder (1480–1531)

Juan Gil de Hontañón (1480 in Rasines, Cantabria – 11 May 1526 in Salamanca) was a master builder and Trasmeran mason of Spain during the 16th century. His first work was associated with Segovia, where he was associated with the school of Juan Guas. At the end of the 15th century he worked on the monasteries of El Parral and El Paular. Hontañón was involved in the building of the Isabelline Gothic Segovia Cathedral, the Castle of Turégano, various monasteries, and the Cathedral of Palencia.

In 1505, the construction of Granada Cathedral was planned and its design was entrusted to Hontañón and Enrique Egas, who were already working on the city's royal chapel. At Salamanca, he was involved in the construction of the new cathedral there in 1512 and, in 1513, worked on the Cathedral of Seville until 1516. He then worked at Segovia again. In Zamora he built the funerary chapel for the Monastery of San Francisco.

His sons, who continued some of his works, were Rodrigo Gil de Hontañón and Juan Gil de Hontañón the Younger.
