= Carrascal (disambiguation) =

Carrascal may refer to the following places:

- Carrascal, municipality in the Philippines
- Carrascal de Barregas, village in Spain
- Carrascal del Río, municipality in Spain
- Carrascal del Obispo, village in Spain

== See also ==
- Carrascalejo, municipality in Spain
