= Fruto =

Fruto is the Spanish word for "fruit". It may refer to:

- Fruto Chamorro (1804–1855), President of Nicaragua
- Emiliano Fruto (born 1984), Colombian baseball player
- Fruto, California, United States, an unincorporated community

== See also ==
- Frutos (disambiguation)
- Fructus (disambiguation)
