= Duratón, Segovia =

Coordinates: 40°17′7″N 3°40′43″W

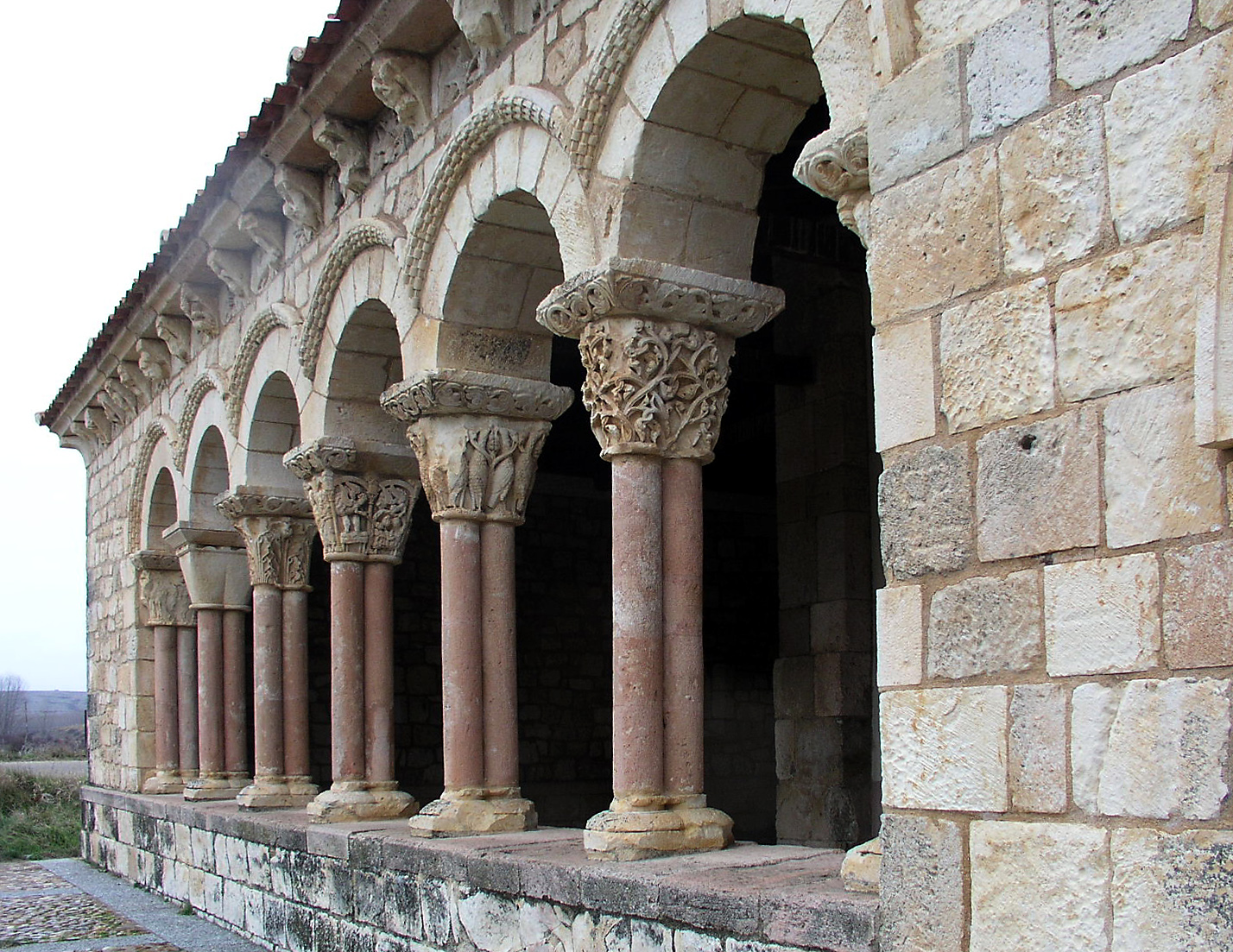
Romanesque church at Duratón

Duratón is a district of Sepúlveda, Segovia, located alongside the Duratón River, from which it takes its name. It is well known for its Romanesque church, La Asunción de María. Roman ruins, Confluenta city, have been found here, as well as a necropolis of the Visigothic era.
