= Segovia Cathedral =

Cathedral in Segovia, Spain

- Cathedral of Our Lady of the Assumption and of Saint Fructus
- Catedral de Nuestra Señora de la Asunción y de San Frutos
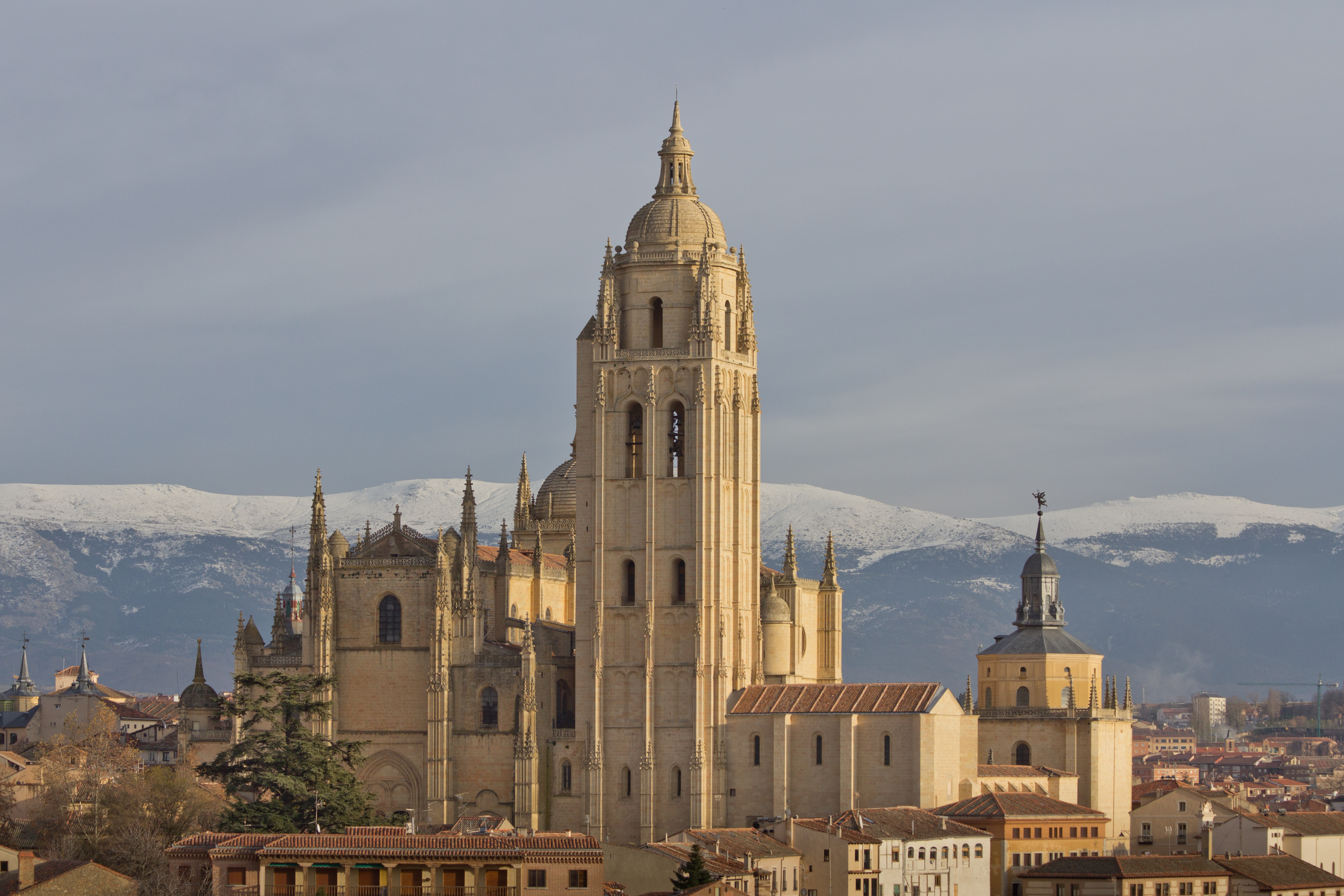
- West façade and bell tower as seen from the Alcázar.
- Segovia Cathedral
- 40.95°N 4.12528°W
- Location: Segovia
- Address: 1, Marqués del Arco
- Country: Spain
- Denomination: Catholic
- Website: catedralsegovia.es

History
- Status: Cathedral
- Dedication: Assumption of the Virgin Mary and Saint Fructus
- Dedicated: 16 July 1768

Architecture
- Architect: Juan Gil de Hontañón (first)
- Style: Late Gothic
- Groundbreaking: 8 June 1525

Administration
- Metropolis: Valladolid
- Diocese: Segovia

Clergy
- Bishop: César Augusto Franco Martínez

UNESCO World Heritage Site
- Criteria: Cultural: (iv)
- Designated: 1985 (9th session)
- Part of: Old Town of Segovia and its Aqueduct
- Reference no.: 311

Spanish Cultural Heritage
- Type: Non-movable
- Criteria: Monument
- Designated: 3 June 1931
- Reference no.: RI-51-0000862

The Cathedral of Our Lady of the Assumption and of Saint Fructus is a Roman Catholic cathedral located in the Spanish city of Segovia. The church is dedicated to the Assumption of the Virgin Mary and to Saint Fructus and is the seat of the Diocese of Segovia. It was built in the Flamboyant style, and was dedicated in 1768, constituting one of the latest Gothic cathedrals in Europe.

== History ==
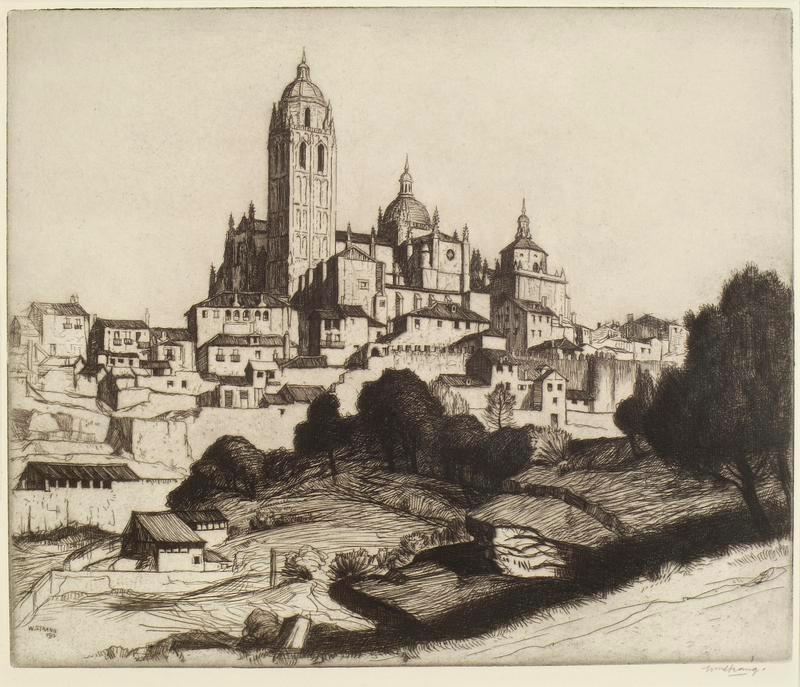
The Cathedral, Segovia by William Strang.

The original cathedral stood adjacent to the Alcazar and was destroyed during the Revolt of the Comuneros. During the Revolt, the city of Segovia murdered their legislator after he voted against their interests during the Cortes of Corunna celebrated on April 22, 1520. Rodrigo Ronquillo was sent to investigate the murder, but the city refused him entry, leading to the blockade of Segovia. The supporters of Charles V barricaded themselves inside the Alcazar, while the Comuneros intended to take the cathedral and use it as a strategic position to siege the Alcazar. After 6 months of constant siege, the Comuneros were defeated in Villalar and the original cathedral laid in ruins.

Charles V then ordered a new cathedral to be built, but demanded it to be built in a completely different place to prevent a similar outcome in the case of another siege to the Alcazar. The new cathedral was to be built on top of the Convent of Saint Clare of the Cross and part of the Jewish quarter (its actual location). The chosen architect was Juan Gil de Hontañón and the first stone was laid on June 8, 1525. To reduce costs, some of the remains of the previous cathedral were used in its construction, suchs as the cloister.

The cathedral had three construction stages: the first between 1525 and 1557 with the architect Juan Gil de Hontañón, his son Rodrigo and García de Cubillas. The second stage took place between 1578 and 1607 by Rodrigo de Solar, Juan Pescador, Diego de Sisniega and others; the last construction campaign was carried out between 1607 and 1685 by Pedro de Brizuela or Francisco de Viadero, due to its peculiar construction, the chancel was not closed until the last year of this stage. The tower originally had a spire of American mahogany wood, but in 1614 the present stone spire was built after lightning caused a fire in the original spire. In 1686 the construction of the Ayala Chapel was begun. The cathedral was consecrated on July 16, 1789, by Bishop Don José Martínez Escalzo.

In June 2017, the Tapestry and liturgical ornaments room was opened, on December 28, 2018, the painting room was inaugurated, a year later, the renovation of the room of Saint Catherine began. On February 1, 2024, restoration work began on the altarpiece of the Chapel of Santiago and the crypt, the entrance to which is located in the aforementioned chapel. The restoration work was completed at the end of 2024.4

== Interior of the cathedral ==
Inside you can appreciate its late Gothic style. It has a structure in three high naves, which receive the name of nave of the Gospel and nave of the Epistle; and ambulatory, emphasizing its beautiful windows of complicated and fine tracery as well as the extraordinary quality of the numerous stained glass windows. The interior shows a remarkable unity of style (late Gothic), except in the dome of 1630 and presents an imposing and sober appearance. Its Gothic vaults rise to a height of 30 meters and measure 50 meters wide and 109 meters long. The transept is covered with a dome finished by Pedro de Brizuela in the 17th century. The tower currently reaches almost 90 meters.

=== Central nave ===
==== Major chapel ====
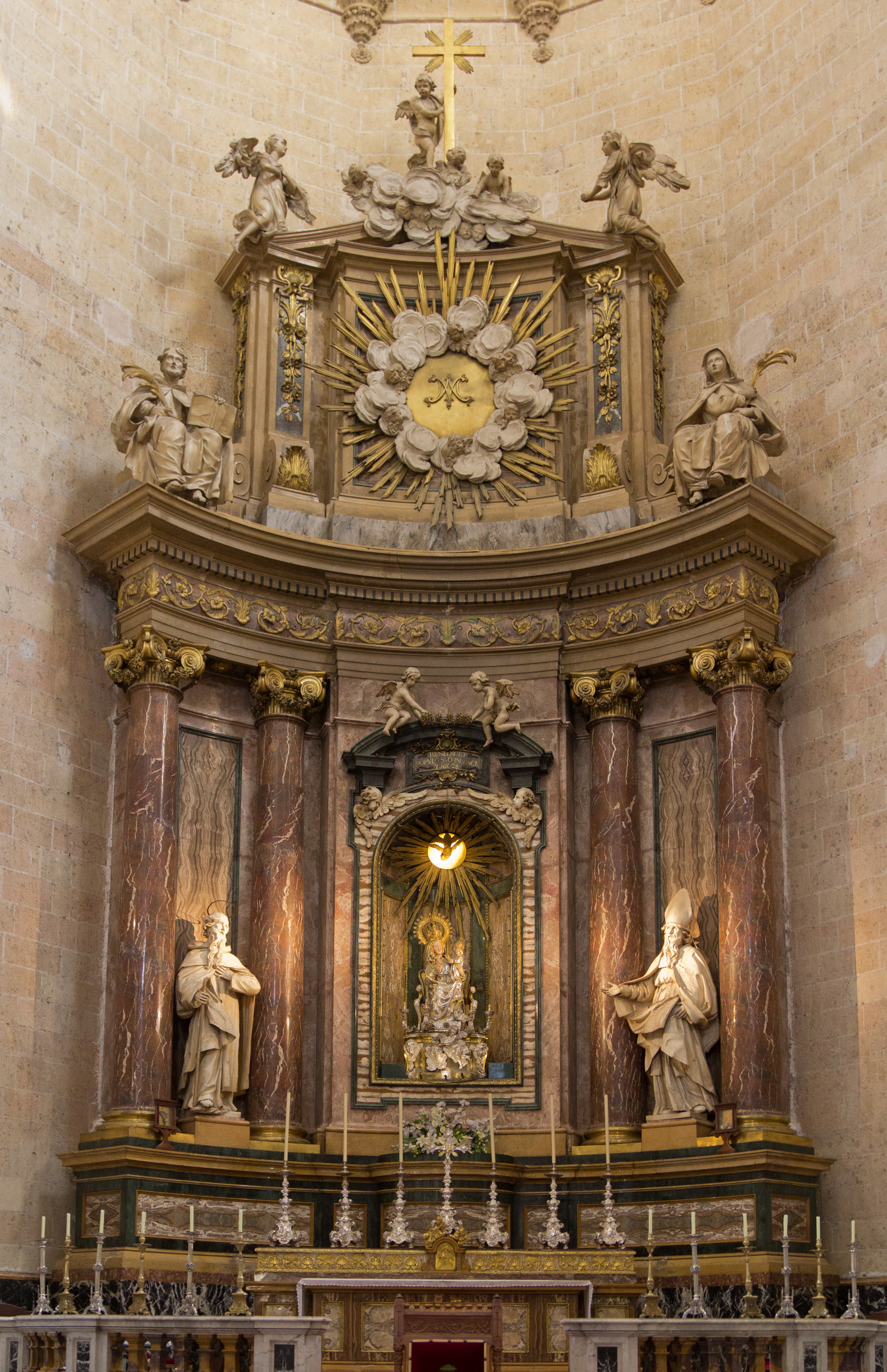
Main altarpiece

The present altar was ordered to be built by Charles III (1759–1788), with a design by Francisco Sabatini (1722–1795). It was begun in 1768 and finished in 1775 in the workshops of the Royal Palace of Madrid.

The main altarpiece of the cathedral of Segovia, which occupies the High Altar, is a set of marbles of different colors and bronzes that recreate a neoclassical structure.

On a plinth covered with black marble veined in white, there is a pedestal, on which rises an altarpiece formed by two bodies of different heights. The lower one is larger with two large columns on each side of the central niche. In the intercolumniations there are two big images in white marble of Saint Frutos and Saint Hierotheos of Segovia, works of Adeba Pacheco. In the central niche is a seated image of the Virgin of Peace (XIII century) and that was donated by King Henry IV to the cathedral, although it is believed that its owner may well have been King Ferdinand III. Currently this image is covered with silver, work done by Antonio Vendetti in 1775, as well as the seat on which the image sits. In the superior part of the altarpiece, on the cornice two seated images in white color, of San Valentín and Santa Engracia with the palms of martyrdom, and in the center of the pediment the anagram of the Virgin.

The grilles that close the High Altar are baroque, work of Antonio de Elorza (1736) and were gilded by Miguel and José Borbúa of Segovia. They are decorated with lilies, coats of arms and medallions in the crests.

==== Choir ====
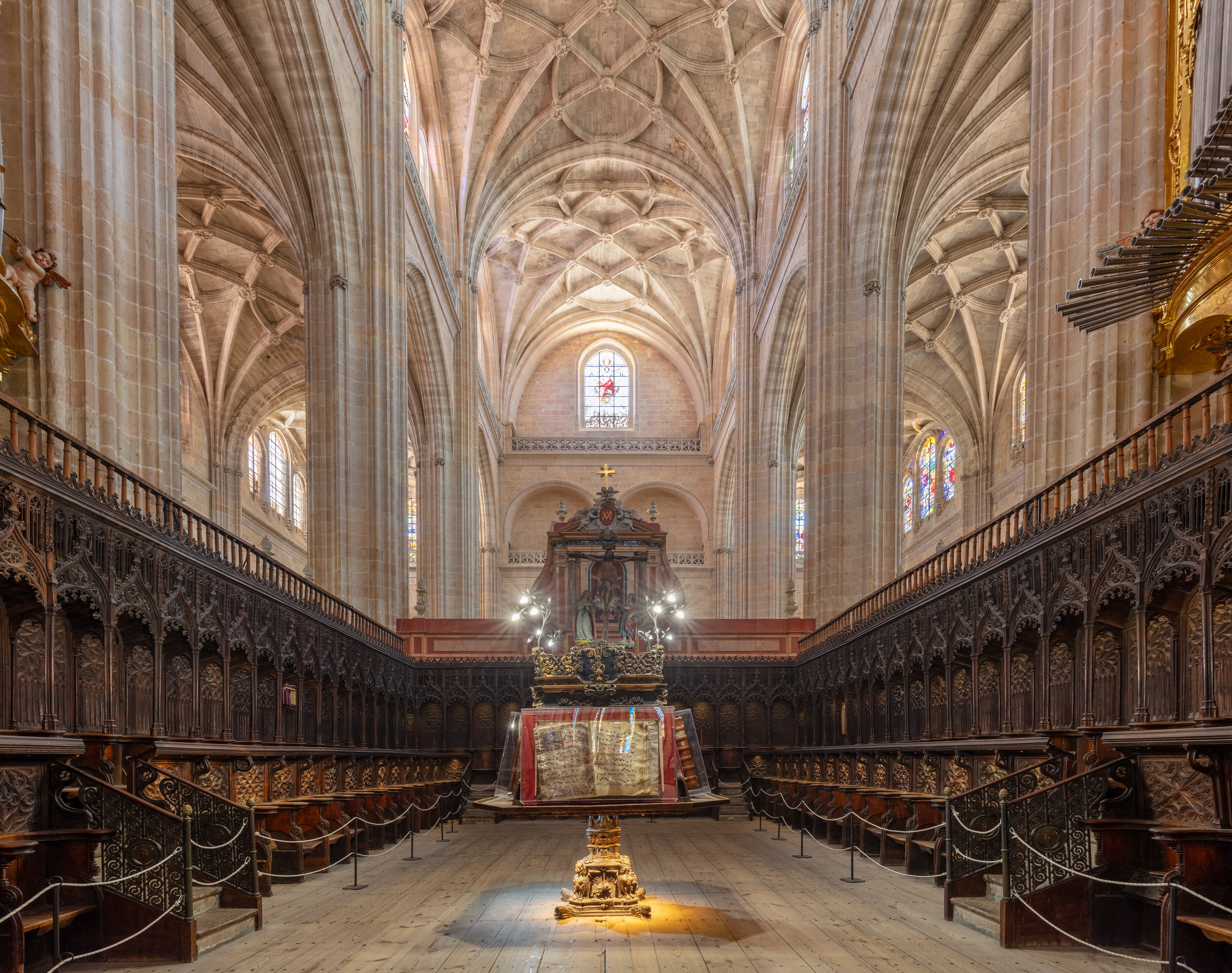
Choir

Located in front of the High Altar, it is enclosed by a grille designed by Antonio Elorza in 1729. The choir stalls were brought from the old cathedral, and placed in 1558 by Juan Gil and Jerónimo de Amberes, and finished in 1790 by Fermín Huici. It is of flamboyant Gothic style, from the end of the 15th century and was ordered by Bishop Juan Arias Dávila.

The arches that form the back of the chairs are ogee arches that in turn enclose lowered arches supported by very long columns. In the upper part, the chairs are decorated with openwork tracery. There are seats reserved for the kings, closer to the grille, to be able to follow the divine offices. Both seats are topped by two small Gothic domes. Above the episcopal chair the coat of arms of Juan Arias Dávila.

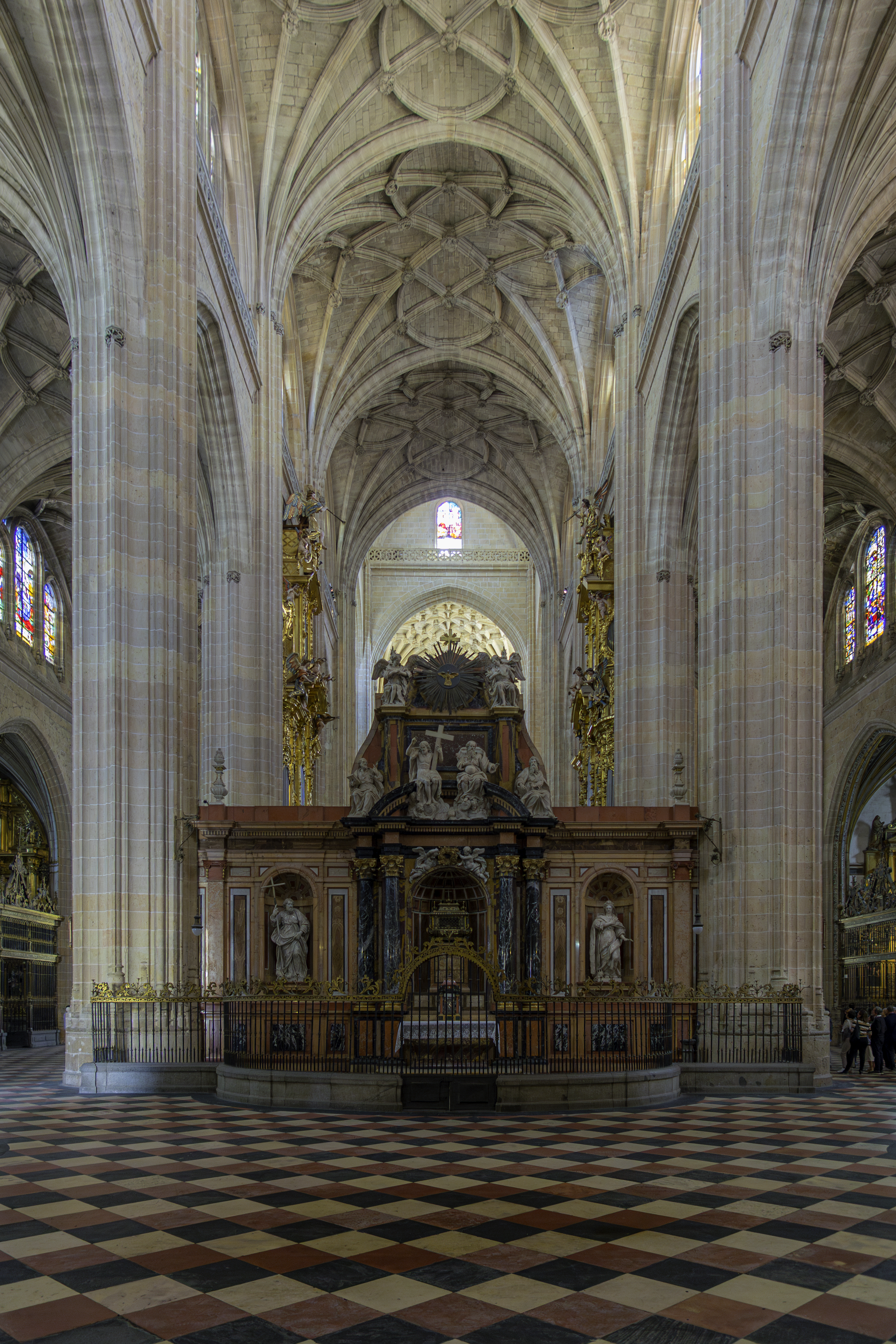
Retroquire

The space between the choir and the main chapel is called “Via Sacra”, in it there are several burials of bishops and a marble pulpit with reliefs of the evangelists and the Immaculate Conception.

==== Retroquire ====
The current altarpiece that occupies the retroquire was located in the Palace of Riofrío, but was moved to its current location in 1782, it only consisted of a central body, so it was necessary to add two more wings to occupy all the space between pillar and pillar. The settlement of the altarpiece was carried out by Ventura Rodríguez and Juan de la Torre y López, the latter responsible for the elaboration of the sides of the choir in the Gospel and Epistle aisles. These sides have niches in which are located the sculptures of the four evangelists made by Manuel Adeva Pacheco.

The altarpiece was the work of Hubert Dumandre in 1758, the main materials of the altarpiece are Spanish marble. The altarpiece consists of a central body and its two wings, added later. The central body is occupied by a silver urn, work of Sebastián de Paredes in 1633, which contains the relics of Saint Frutos. Above this body are sculptures of St. Peter, St. Paul and the Holy Trinity. In the right body there is an effigy of St. Elizabeth and in the right one of St. Philip. This is in memory of the parents of Charles III, for his donation of the altarpiece.

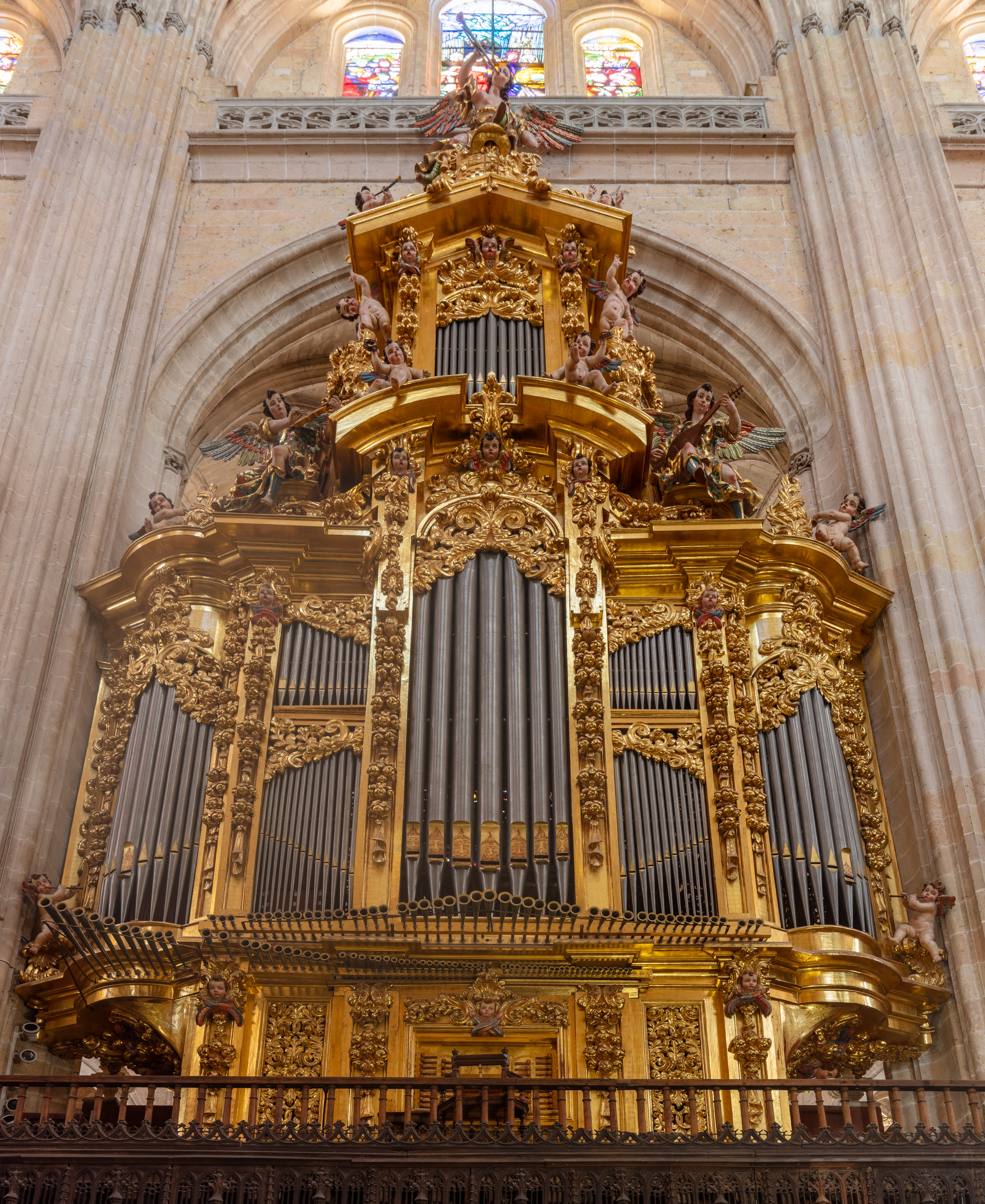
Organ of the Epistle

==== Organs ====
The original organs of the old Cathedral were built in 1473 during the reign of Enrique IV, the person in charge of their construction was Johan Cortexo. Due to the destruction of the old cathedral, the organs were moved to the Convent of Santa Clara until 1559, when they were relocated to the choir of the new Cathedral.

The two present organs were built in 1702 and 1769 by order of the Cabildo. The first organ to be replaced was the one in the nave of the Epistle, commissioned on July 7, 1700, and delivered in August 1702 under the orders of Pedro de Liborna Echevarría.

The organ on the Gospel side began its construction in 1769 thanks to a donation made by the bishop of Segovia, Juan José Martínez y Descalzo. The Cabildo commissioned Pedro Manuel de Echevarría to build it, although it would be his son, José de Echevarría who would practically carry out the construction.

=== North nave (Nave of the Gospel) ===
==== Chapel of Saint Anthony the Great ====
It was granted to Antonio Idiáquez Manrique, bishop of Segovia, to be used as a family pantheon. It preserves a baroque altarpiece executed by José Vallejo Vivanco between 1696 and 1697, and dedicated to Saint Anton, whose image presides over the whole, the work of Pedro Valle, who also began the tomb of the prelate and left it unfinished when he died. The praying image of Idiáquez, accompanied by a page, was finally made by the Segovian José Galbán, son-in-law of Juan Alonso de Villabrille y Ron. The effigy of the titular saint was stewed by Pedro Gutiérrez, and painted by Matías de Ortega, and the paintings are due to Francisco Herranz.

==== Chapel of the Pietá ====
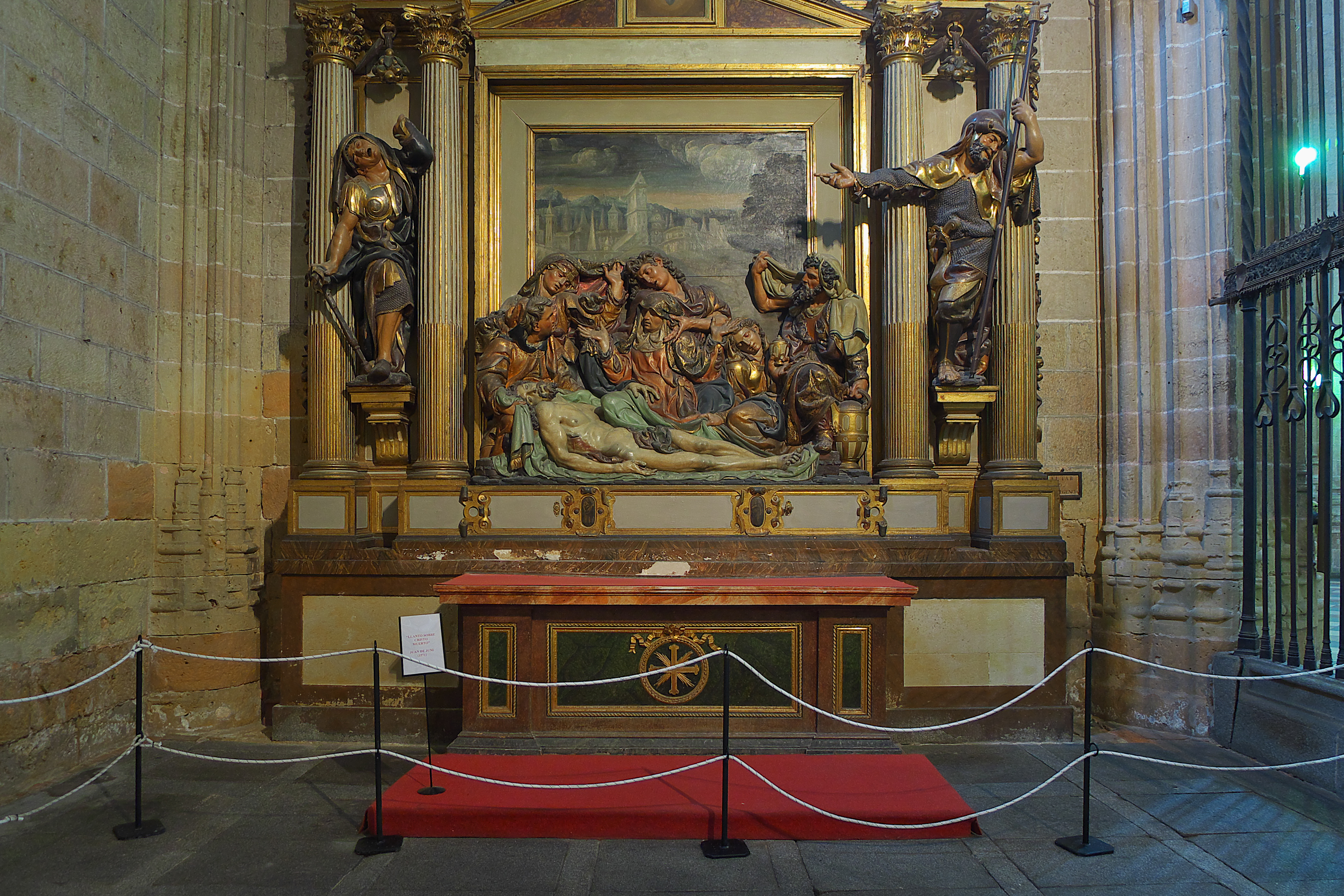
Altarpiece of the Pietá

The Chapel of the Pietà, also known as the Chapel of the Holy Burial, was founded by Juan Rodríguez de Noreña, canon fabriquero of the cathedral itself, who commissioned the chapel's altarpiece to Juan de Juni, who in 1571 made a piece similar to the Burial of Christ that he made in the middle of the 16th century in Valladolid. In front of the main altar there is a canvas representing the doubt of the apostle Saint Thomas, attributed to Alonso Sánchez Coello.

The grille that closes the space belonged to the main chapel of the primitive cathedral of Santa María, and was made in 1515 by the rejero Francisco de Salamanca. It is a remarkable work as a whole, notable for its exquisite details and is one of the author's most characteristic works, along with those he made for the monastery of El Paular, the sepulcher of the Tostado in Avila and the pulpits of the cathedral of Seville.

==== Chapel of Saint Andrew ====
It was founded by Andrés de Madrigal, treasurer and canon of the cathedral, who instituted two chaplaincies and endowed the space with a grille and altarpiece.

The grille was begun in 1618 by the Madrid-born Francisco Hernández, in a manner similar to that of the chapel of Santiago, with the coat of arms of the founder on the upper part. The design of the altarpiece is the work of Pedro de Brizuela in 1621, and its execution is due to Juan de Alcelegui, Juan Imberto and Felipe de Aragón.

==== Chapel of Saint Cosmas and Damian ====
The altarpiece was commissioned to the Segovian assembler Domingo Fernández, on February 5, 1629, by Doctor Pero Suárez de la Concha and Don Juan Antonio Berrocal Bezilla. The altarpiece presents classicist traces and is divided in three streets and two bodies supported on a bank. The central street of the first body contains the sculptural group of Saint Cosmas and Saint Damian, both made in the workshop of Gregorio Fernandez. The niche of the second body contains an image of the Immaculate Conception, also from the workshop of Gregorio Fernández.

==== Chapel of Saint Gregory the Great ====
The chapel was founded in 1623 by Alonso Nieto and his wife. The altarpiece of the late seventeenth century is usually attributed to the assembler José Vallejo Vivanco, its composition is of three streets divided by Solomonic columns, the main canvas represents the Mass of St. Gregory. The grille is baroque, installed in 1716, and is by Antonio de Elorza.

==== Chapel of the Conception ====
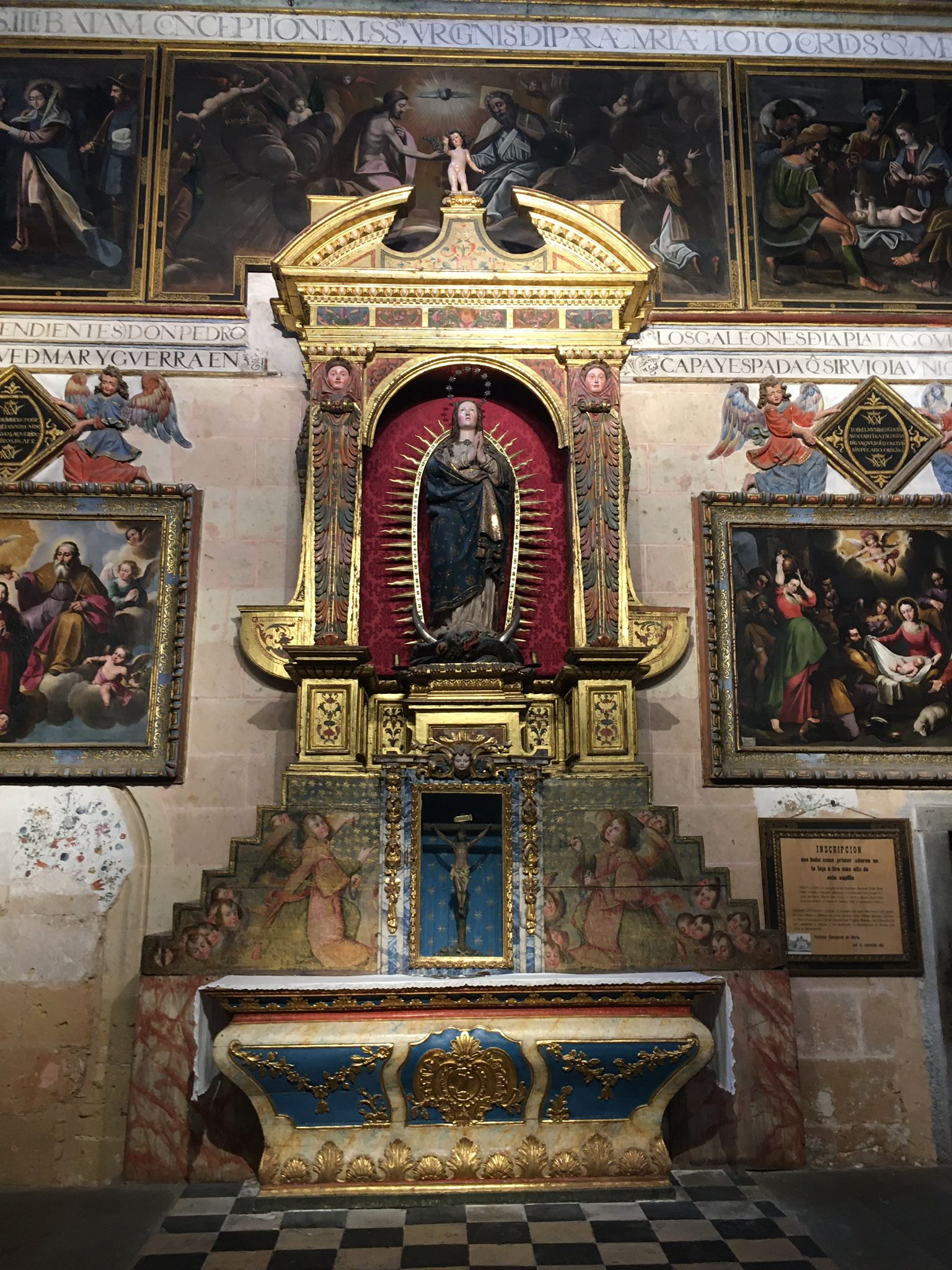
Altarpiece of the Chapel

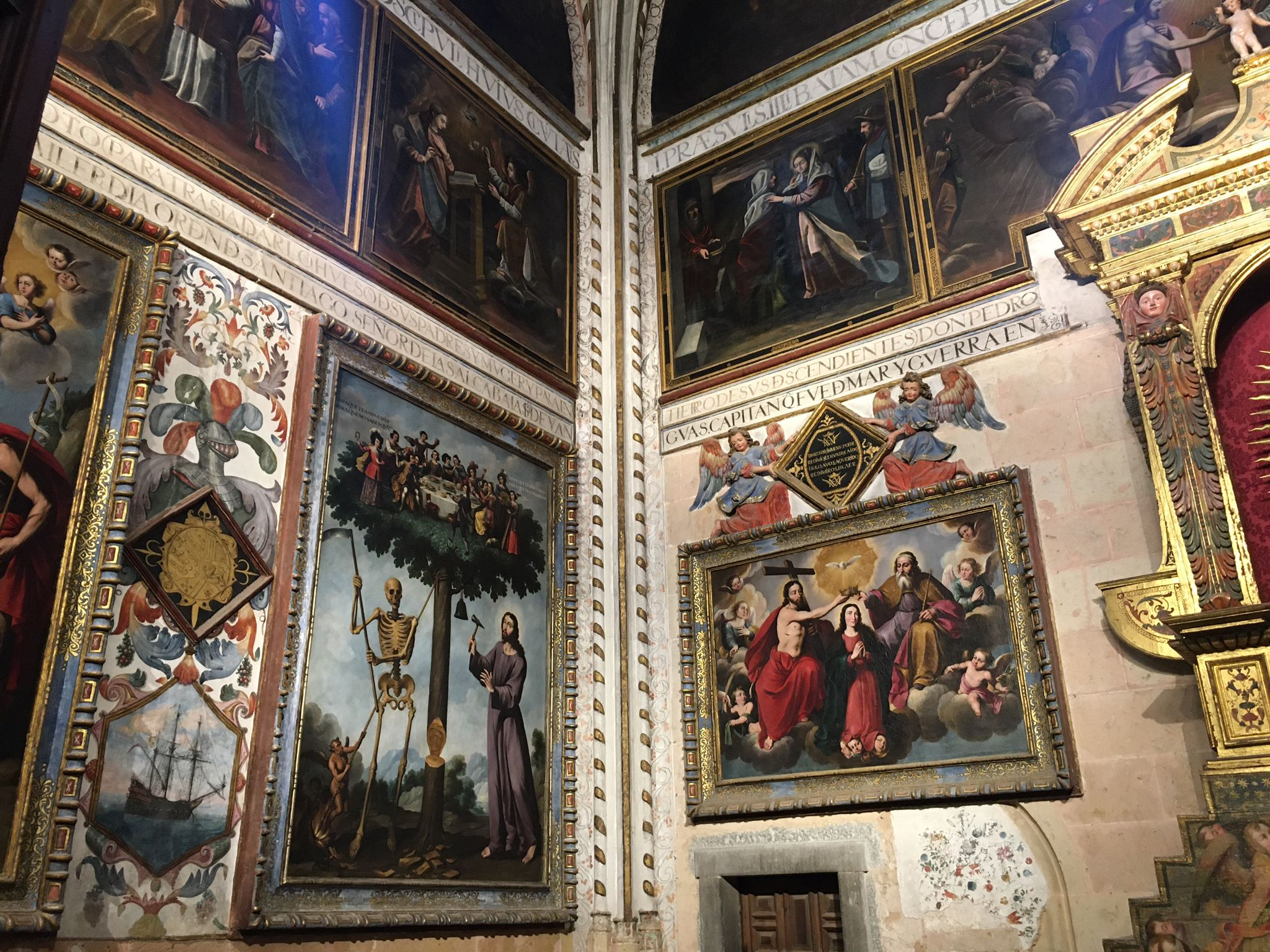
Painting of the Chapel of the Conception

Located at the foot of the cathedral and next to the so-called Door of Forgiveness, it was built in 1531. It has a ribbed vault of terceletes, decorated by Juan del Río in 1622 with symbols of the Immaculate Conception. The cathedral chapter gave it in patronage in 1645 to Captain Pedro Fernández de Miñano y Contreras, governor of Cádiz, knight of the Order of Santiago, captain of the La Plata fleet in the service of Philip IV of Spain, to be used as a family pantheon.

It includes a collection of works by the Seville-based Flemish painter Ignacio de Ries, painted in 1653, consisting of the Tree of Life, the Adoration of the Shepherds, the Conversion of St. Paul, the Baptism of Christ, the Coronation of the Virgin and King David, which are his best works.9 In addition, the chapel is presided over by a polychrome wooden altarpiece, which houses in its center space an image of María Santísima de la Limpia Concepción, commissioned by the chapter to Antonio de Herrera Barnuevo, sculptor to Philip IV, in 1621.

The gate that closes the chapel was made in Jerez de la Frontera in mahogany wood from America by Francisco Jiménez, at the end of the first half of the 17th century.

=== South nave (Nave of the Epistle) ===
==== Chapel of the Cristo del Consuelo (Christ of Consolation) ====
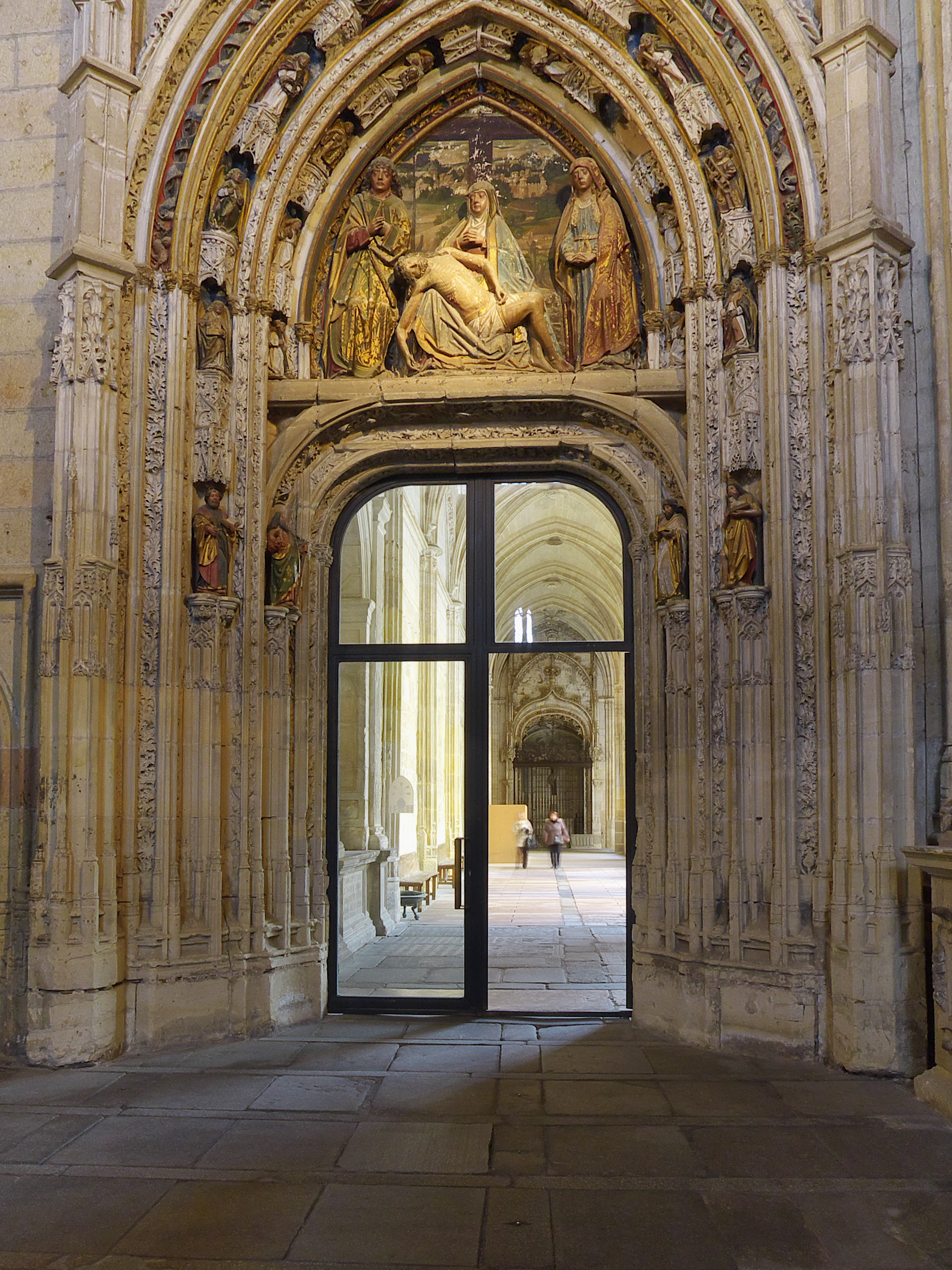
Access to the cloister

The chapel of the Cristo del Consuelo gives access to the cloister, which in turn gives access to the Chapter Room, the Painting Room, the Room of Santa Catalina and the Room of Tapestries and Liturgical Ornaments. The chapel contains a baroque altarpiece from the XVII century, on the bench you can see a carving of Christ on the cross, in the central street is the Cristo del Consuelo, a carving from the XVII century that comes from the old Jesuit College.

The door that gives access to the cloister comes from the old cathedral, this was paid by Isabel the Catholic and made by Juan Guas in 1483. The sculptures located in the tympanum are works of Sebastián Almonacid, the central figure is the Piedad or the Virgin in her Fifth Anguish, which is surrounded by angels that carry instruments of the Passion, the cover presents remains of polychrome. The grille that closes the chapel was created by Fray Francisco de Salamanca in 1508 and once closed the choir of the old cathedral.

In front of the altarpiece there are two funerary monuments of bishops in recumbent position. The tombs belong to Don Raimundo de Losana and Don Diego de Covarrubias; they date from the beginning of the 17th century and the end of the 16th century respectively.

==== Chapel of Saint James the Great ====
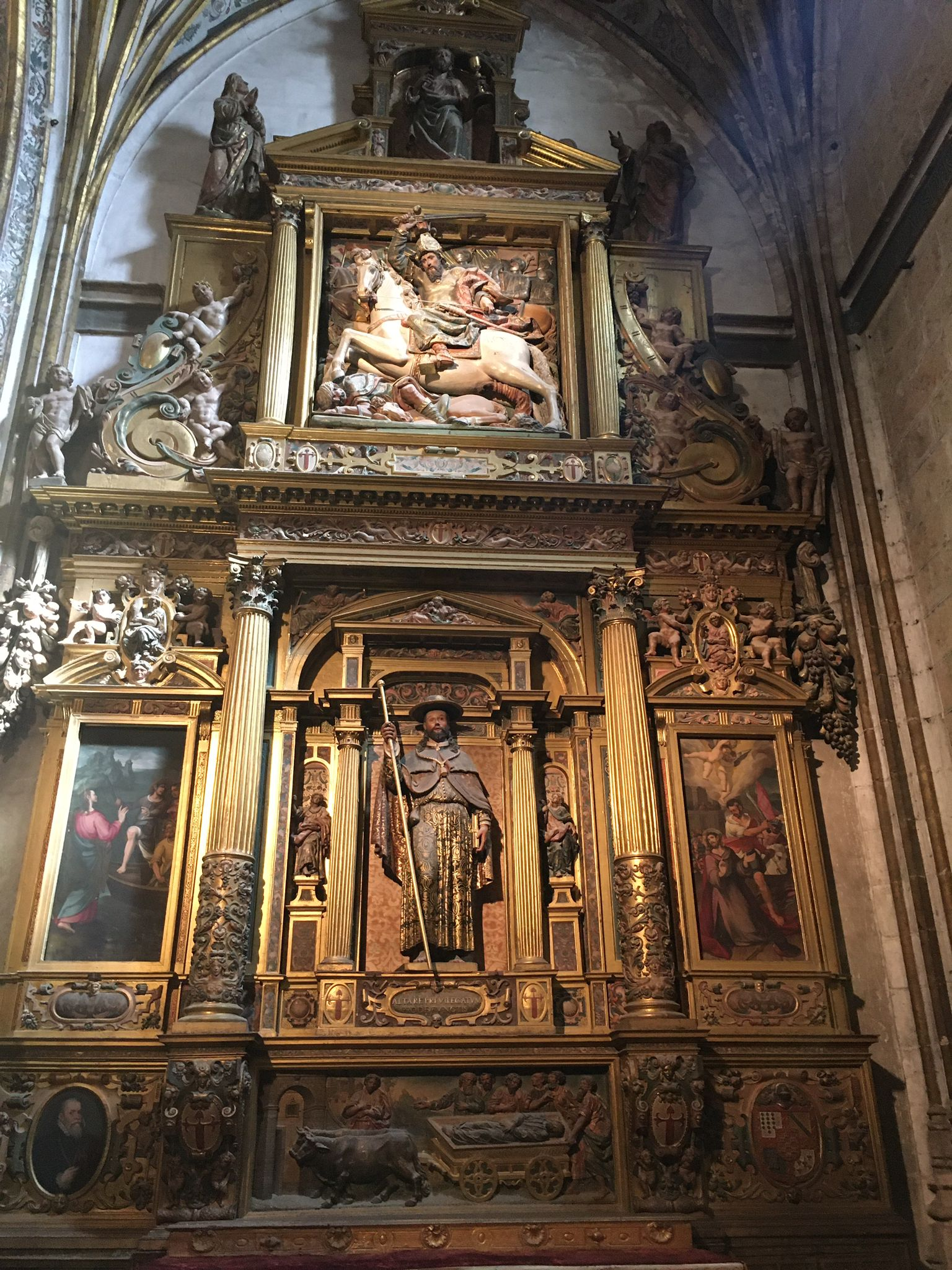
Altarpiece of the Chapel of St James

It was the first chapel of the cathedral to be given to a civilian, granted by the Chapter of Segovia in 1577 to Francisco Gutiérrez de Cuéllar, chief accountant of Philip II and commander of the Order of Santiago, being the first to be given to a civilian.

The altarpiece that presides over the chapel is Baroque in style, is dedicated to the apostle St. James and is the work of Pedro de Bolduque in 1595, being the most refined example of the Bolduquian altarpiece, with a classical structure and decoration influenced by the work of Gaspar Becerra. The polychromy was done by the Segovian painter Alonso de Herrera, and the portrait of the founder contained in the ensemble is attributed to Alonso Sánchez Coello.

Inside the chapel there are two other altarpieces, one is dedicated to the Virgen de la Fuencisla and dates from the 18th century; the other is the work of the Maestro de Valseca in the 16th century and consists of an attic with a representation of the crucifixion of Saint Paul and Peter; the central body is occupied by a representation of Saint Joaquin and Saint Anne and the bench contains several canvases representing Saint Lucia, Saint Agatha and Saint Apollonia.

On the right side of the altarpiece there is a door with granite jambs, from which starts a staircase composed of fifteen steps, also of granite, that descends to a crypt, also called in some documents as “sacristy”. This is the only piece excavated in the subsoil of the cathedral, and it must have been finished in 1604, and was designed by Rodrigo del Solar. Once below, there is a landing or vestibule from which one enters two rooms. The one on the right, long and narrow, is paved with brick, and the walls and vault are decorated with angels, in grisaille, carrying the instruments of the Passion. To the left, and through three steps, is located a more comfortable room, with the function of family pantheon. It is illuminated by two skylights open to the cloister garden, and on the west wall there is a deep recess, while in the east a slab of granite inlaid into it serves as an altarpiece, decorated with the image of Nuestra Señora de la Antigua, which the humidity has almost completely erased, except for the image of the Child, of good workmanship.

The vault and ribs are decorated with tempera paintings. The chapel is closed by a baroque grille dated 1594, the work of Juan de Salamanca and decorated by Juan del Río, which was the model for the rest of the cathedral.

==== Chapel of Saint Barbara ====
The stone altarpiece was made at the beginning of the 17th century by Pedro de Brizuela and in 1788 the altarpiece was stuccoed imitating marble. The altarpiece is composed of a single body in which is located the image of St. Barbara, dating from the eighteenth century and made of polychrome wood.

In the chapel there is also a baptismal font from the 15th century, from the old cathedral, made of alabaster. Its author is unknown, but it is usually related to the arrival of Juan Guas in Segovia.

==== Chapel of the Cristo Yacente (Recumbent Christ) ====
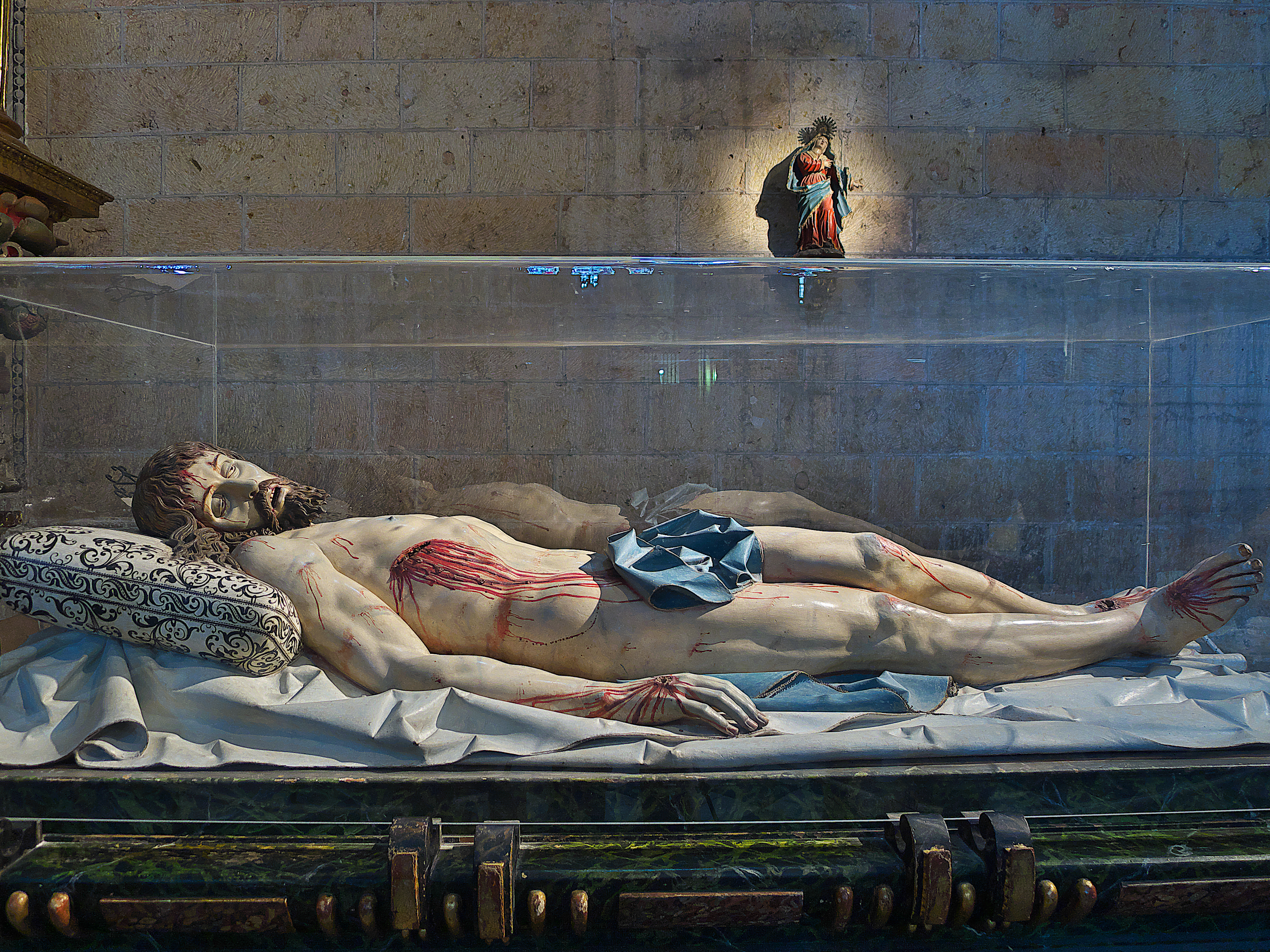
Rucumbent Christ by Gregorio Fernandez

The altarpiece is from the XVII century, in the central body there is a canvas of the Descent of Christ, on the altar of the altarpiece there is an urn that contained the image of the Recumbent Christ, made to be contemplated from the side.

The image of the Recumbent Christ is a baroque sculpture of the XVII century, made by Gregorio Fernandez and donated by the bishop Melchor de Moscoso y Sandoval. The carving is characterized by its dramatism and naturalness, with a slender and very detailed body. The carving is carried in procession through the streets of Segovia on Good Friday by the parish of San Andrés “Camino al Sepulcro”.

The grille is baroque and was made by Lorenzo Hernández de Medina and gilded by the master Pedro de Prádena in the second half of the 17th century.

==== Chapel of Saint Baise ====
The chapel contains a simple baroque altarpiece of the end of the XVII century of which the author is unknown, in the central street is the carving that represents San Blas as bishop, with the crosier in the left hand. To the left of the altarpiece is an oil on canvas dedicated to Saint Cecilia, whose authorship is attributed to Francisco Llamas.

From the chapel you can access the tower of the cathedral, both the bell tower and the bell ringer's house.

==== Chapel of the Sagrario ====
The chapel of the Sagrario is symmetrical to the chapel of Saint Anthony the Great, and is subdivided into two different spaces: on one side the so-called chapel of the Cristo de la Agonía, and on the other the chapel of the Ayala family. At the entrance to the chapel there is a Romanesque crucified Christ accompanied by the Virgin and Saint John.

===== Chapel of the Cristo de la Agonía (Christ of the Agony) =====
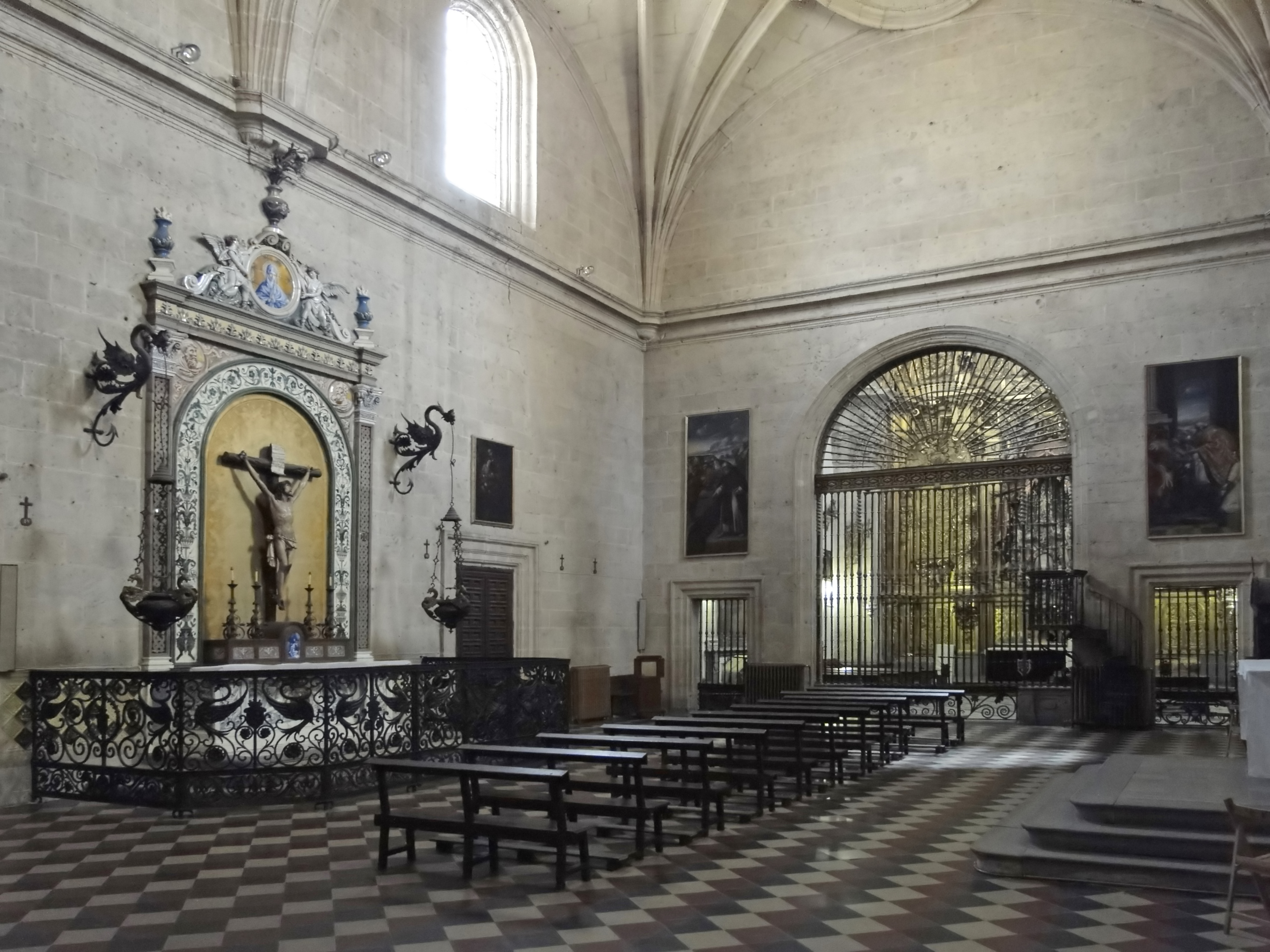
Chapel of the Cristo de la Agonia

The chapel of Christ of the Agony is the first room of the chapel of the Sagrario, and gives access to the sacristy of the cathedral. The space, with two ribbed vaults, contains a chest of drawers, and different canvases of various bishops of Segovia are scattered along the walls.

Among the most outstanding items in the chapel is the ceramic altarpiece made by Daniel Zuloaga for the Santísimo Cristo de la Agonía, a crucifix attributed to Manuel Pereira, which was donated by Ramona López de Ayala y del Hierro, mother of the historian Juan de Contreras y López de Ayala, Marquis of Lozoya. The work was made in 1897 in the earthenware factory La Segoviana and is one of the most important ceramic works of its time. The set is completed by a grille, candelabra and wrought iron lamps by the wrought ironworker Ángel Pulido.

===== Chapel of the Ayala family =====
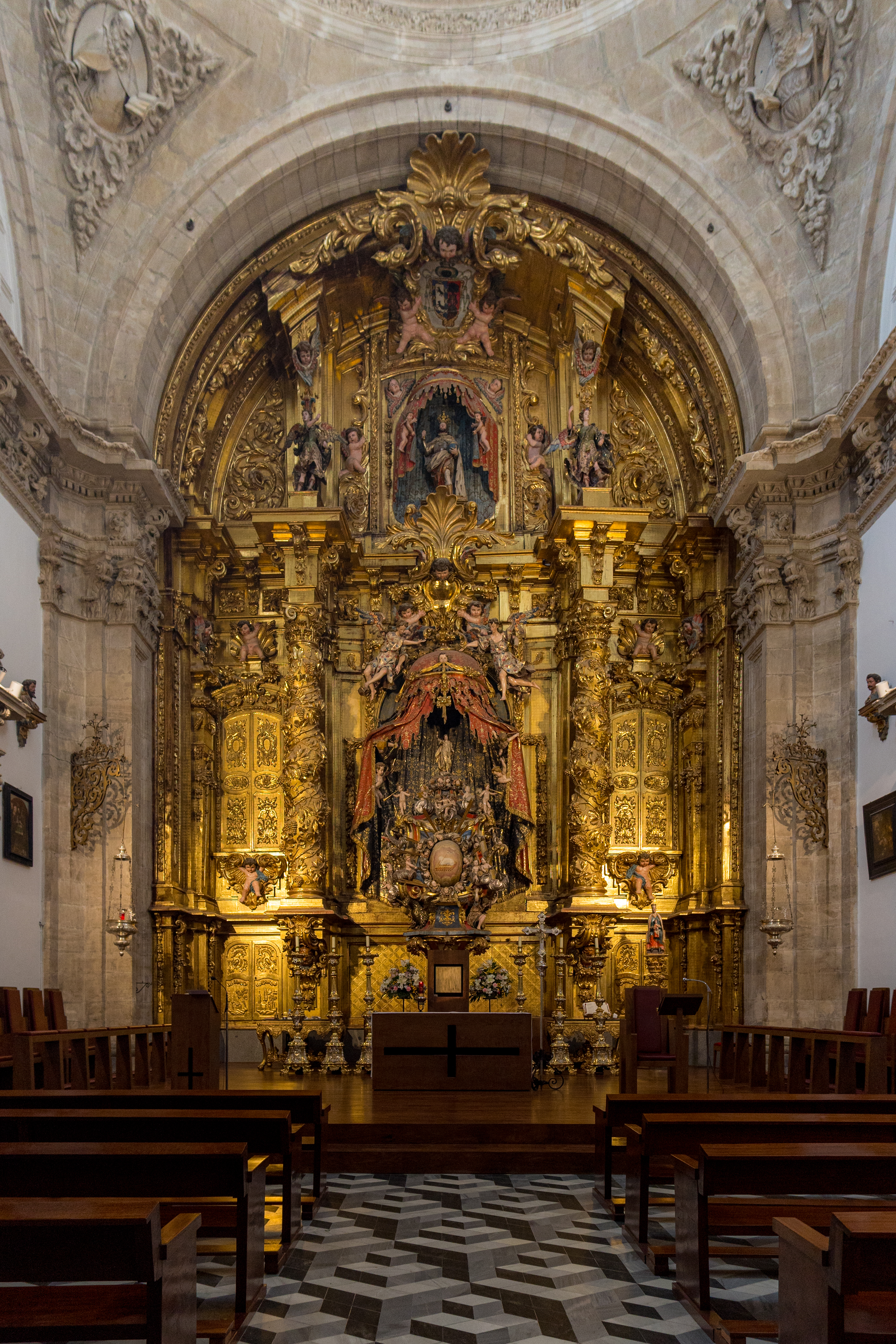
Altarpiece of the Chapel of the Ayala family

The Chapel of the Ayala family is the second room of the Sagrario Chapel. Its main attraction is the baroque altarpiece designed by José Churriguera, whose construction began in 1686. Two Solomonic columns divide the altarpiece, in the central space there is a tabernacle, while on the sides there are two alacenas (hollow in the wall with shelves) to store relics. In the upper part there is an image of Saint Ferdinand under a canopy and protected by archangels.

The tabernacle was added in 1718. It was designed so that it could rotate on its base, since each of its four sides represents the Annunciation, Pentecost, a casket for Holy Thursday and an expositor for the day of Corpus Christi.

On the sides of the chapel there are four attached sepulchers belonging to Juan Ayala Berganza, Diego Ayala Berganza, Gaspar Ayala Berganza and Antonio Ayala Berganza.

=== Chapels of the Ambulatory ===
==== Chapel of Saint Peter ====
The altarpiece was commissioned to Pedro de Bolduque, who had already worked in the cathedral, in 1585, originally consisted of three streets and an attic, but the side streets disappeared when it was moved. The central images of the altarpiece are two sculptures, Christ tied to the column and Saint Peter. Below is a relief depicting the scene of Quo Vadis. The attic of the altarpiece is closed with a painting by Cristóbal de Velasco representing the Martyrdom of St. Peter.

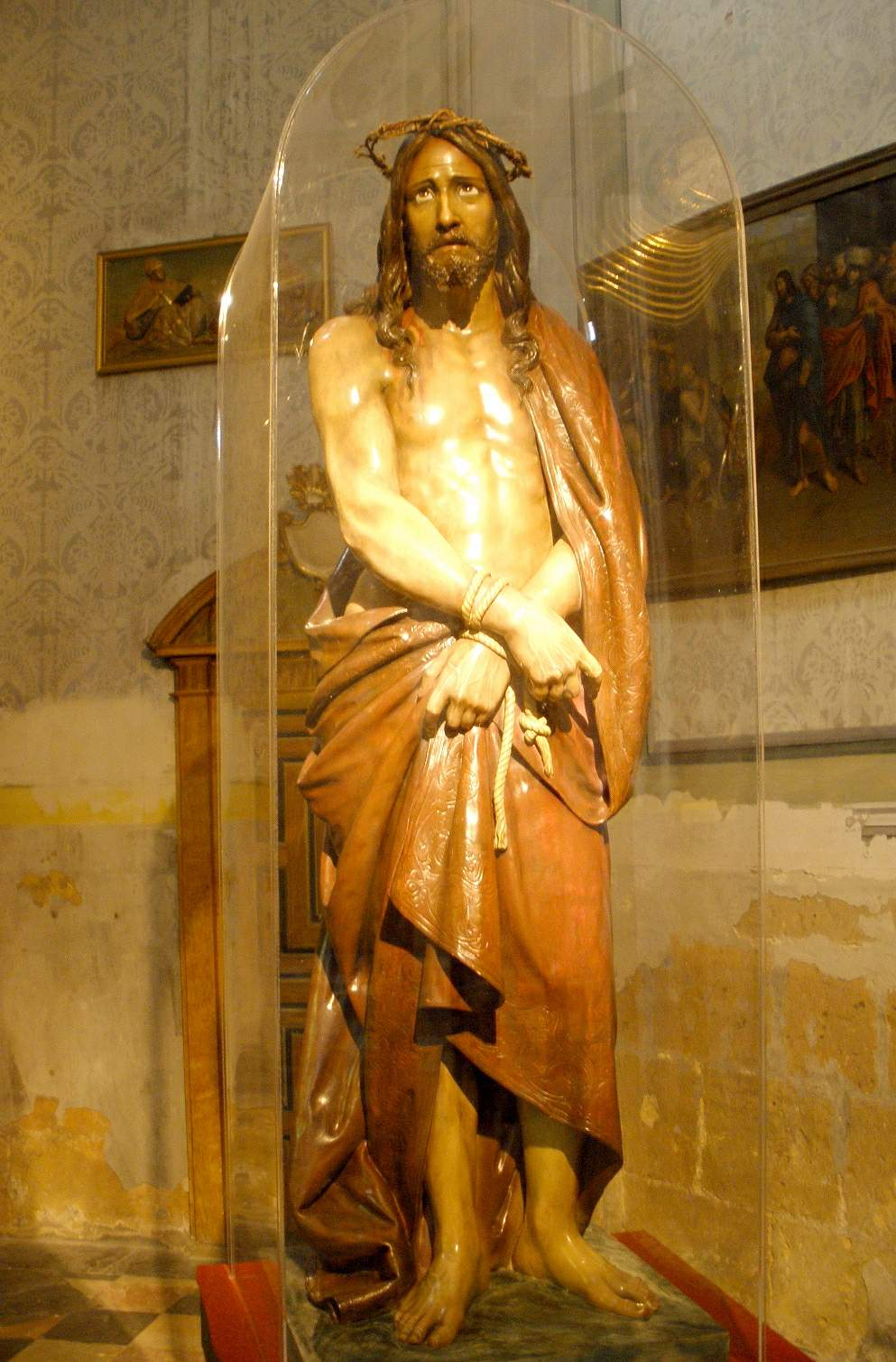
Ecce Homo carving

==== Chapel of Saint Ildefonsus ====
The chapel presents a classicist baroque altarpiece of the XVIII century, the altarpiece is the work of Manuel Adeba Pacheco and it is made of stuccoed wood. The central image is a relief in which the Virgin is represented imposing the chasuble to Saint Ildefonso with the help of an angel.

There are two showcases in the chapel, the first contains an Ecce Homo, commissioned by Bishop Julián Miranda Bistuer. The carving arrived in Segovia in 1907 with the purpose of being a processional step. The sculpture presents a half-naked Christ, dressed in a red cape and manacled.

The second showcase contains another Ecce homo, of anonymous author and dated in the XVIII century; and a sculpture of the Virgin as a sorrowful Virgin (XVII century). There are also two processional crosses, the first one dates from the XVII century and is made of wood with mother-of-pearl inlays. The second is the work of the silversmith Antonio Oquendo and dates from 1519.

==== Chapel of Saint Hierotheos of Segovia ====
The altarpiece of the chapel is from the XVIII century, work of Juan Maurat, in 1772 Santiago Casado was in charge of the gilding of the altarpiece. The tabernacle of the altarpiece is decorated with the painting of the Virgin and Child, whose authorship is anonymous. The gate that closes the chapel was made by Gregorio Aguirre in 1774.

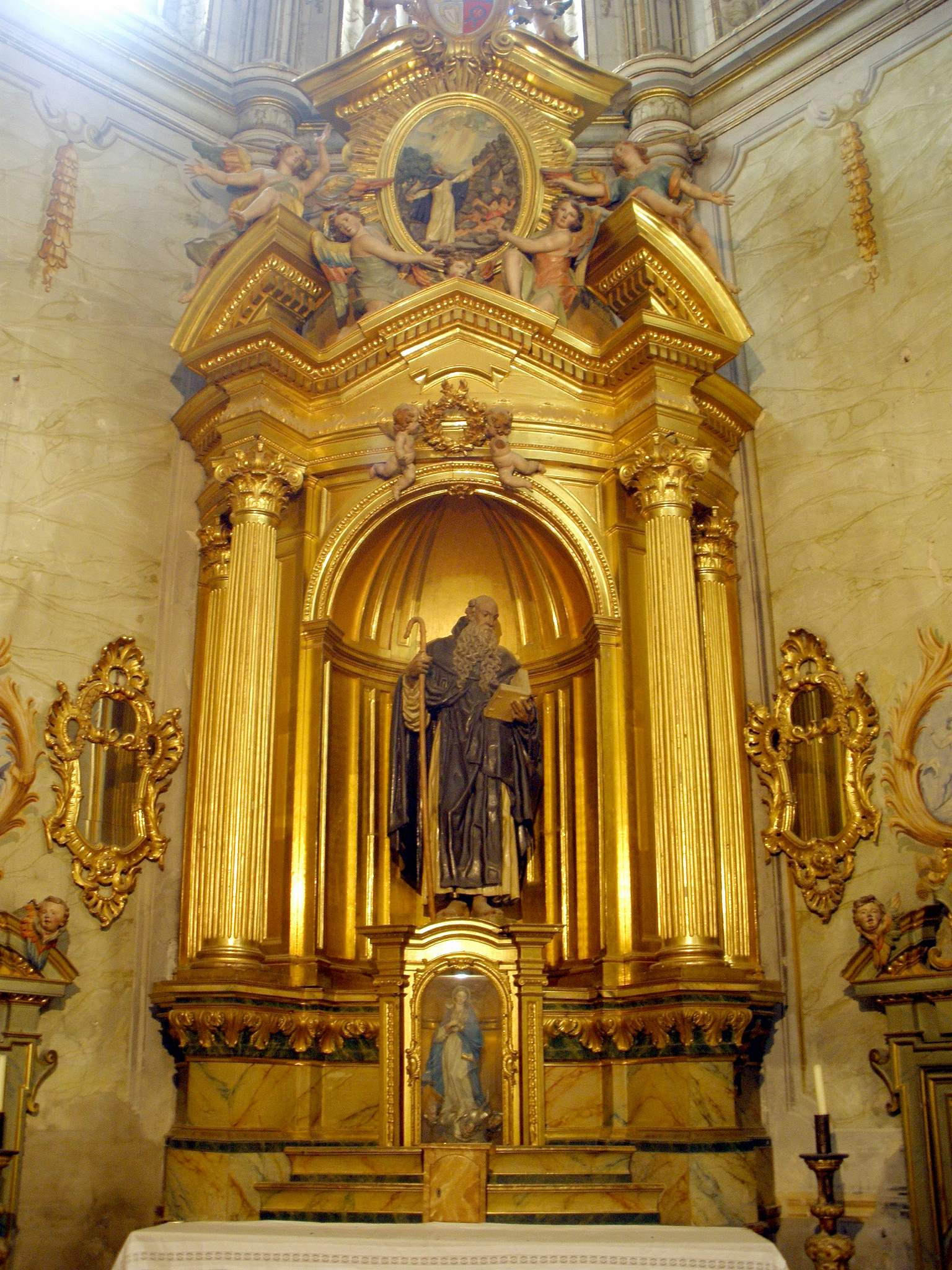
Altarpiece of the Chapel of Saint Fructus

==== Chapel of Saint Fructus ====
The three altarpieces that decorate the chapel were commissioned in 1747, they are dedicated to Saint Fructus and his two brothers: Saint Valentín and Saint Engracia, the three are made of wood and have the same structure. In the lateral altarpieces appear Saint Valentín with the book in the hand and Saint Engracia with the martyr's palm, the central altarpiece is of Saint Fuctus, this one is taller than that of his brothers, in the bank of the same one there is a carving of the Virgin. The chapel is closed with a grille by Domingo Martinez.

==== Chapel of Saint Anthony of Padua ====
Both the altarpiece and the image are of unknown author, the first one was donated in 1782, it presents a classicist style. It is stuccoed to imitate marble and it is formed by three streets, in the lateral ones appear Saint Teresa of Jesus and a Jesuit saint, the central street is occupied by the carving of Saint Anthony.

==== Chapel of Our Lady of the Rosary ====
The chapel is decorated with a simple altarpiece that presents an oil on canvas, work of Ramón Bayeu, with the titular theme of the chapel, the walls and vault of the chapel are also decorated with murals of the same author. To the sides of the altarpiece there are wood carvings dated in the XIX century, these represent the Sacred Heart of Jesus and the Immaculate Heart of Mary.

==== Chapel of Saint Joseph ====
The altarpiece that presides over the chapel is from the XVIII century, in the central niche there is a carving of Saint Joseph with the Child in his hand. In the attic of the altarpiece there are two carvings of St. Teresa and St. John of the Cross.

== Stained Glass ==
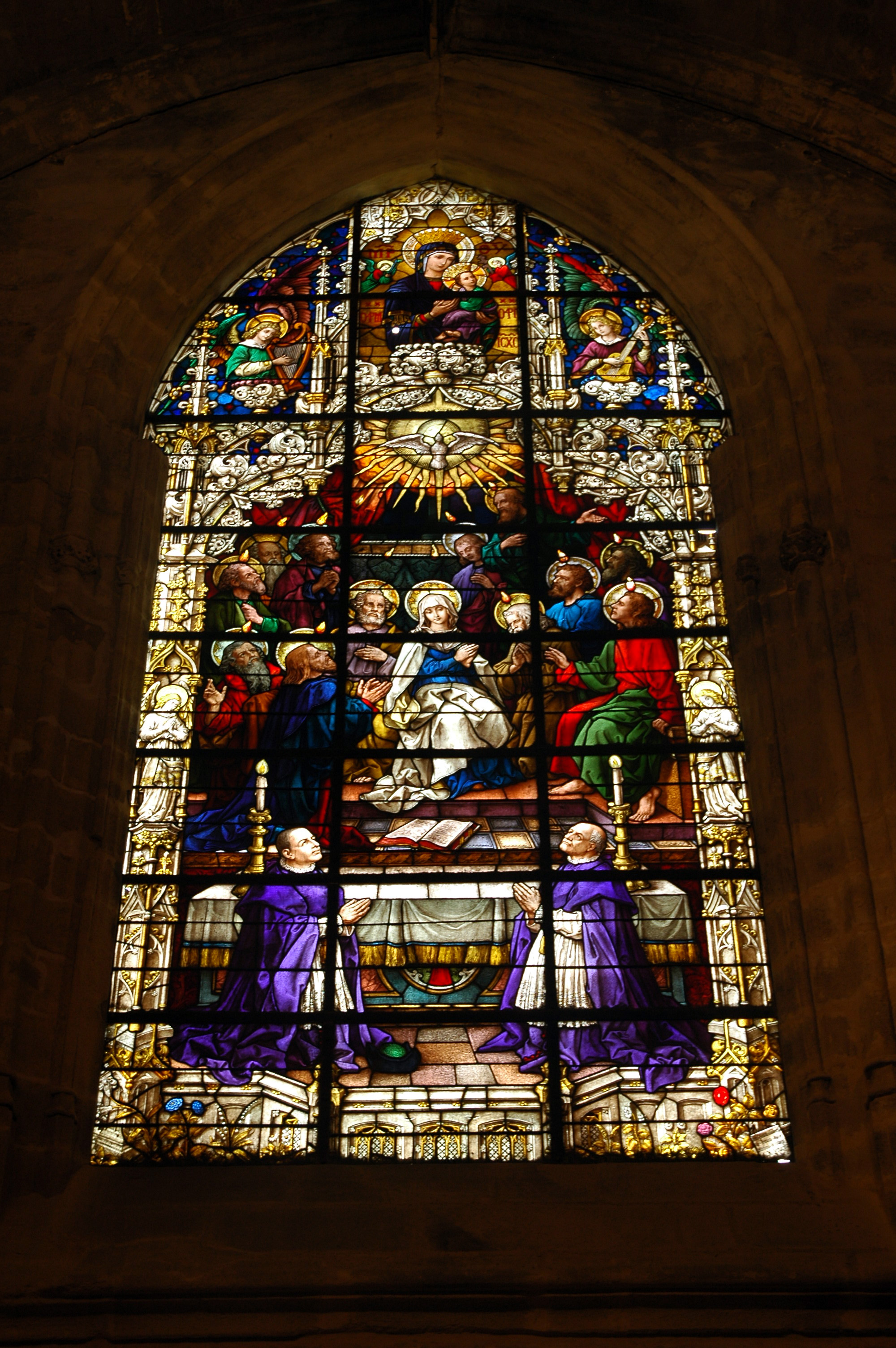
Stained glass window, made by Francisco Herranz in the XVIIth century

The stained glass windows of the cathedral are one of the most important sets of Spanish stained glass heritage.30 The set consists of 65

pieces that are distributed in time in three different phases.

The first phase corresponds to the XVIth century, forms one of the most important series of Mannerist stained glass windows made by the Pierres workshop (Pierres of Holand, Pierres of Chivarri, along with Nicolás of Vergara, Nicolás of Holand and Gualter of Ronch), and are one of the most important Renaissance groups in Europe.

The second phase was executed in the seventeenth century by Francisco Herranz, who made a theoretical programming of the stained glass windows in a manuscript entitled Orden de las Ystorias que se han de poner en las vidrieras de la Yglesia Mayor de Segovia, preserved in the Cathedral Archive of Segovia. This set consists of 33 pieces and is the most extensive phase. Finally, a third phase took place in 1916, when seven stained glass windows were included for the main chapel made by the workshop Casa Maumejan

In 2010, the complete restoration of the whole was commissioned. The commission fell to the Segovian glassmaker Carlos Muñoz de Pablos.

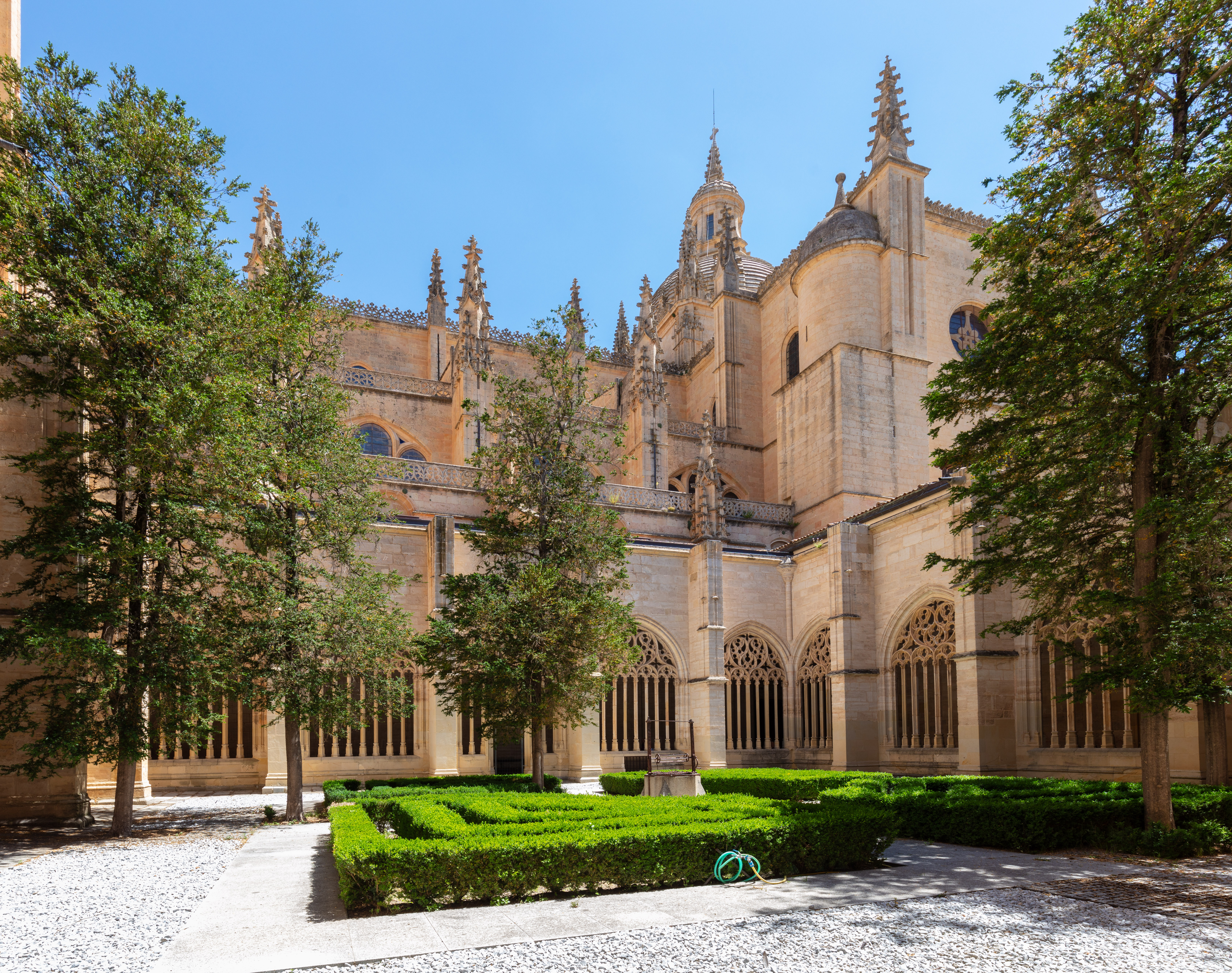
Cloister

== Other rooms and spaces ==
=== Cloister ===
It is of flamboyant Gothic style. It was transferred stone by stone from the old cathedral of Santa Maria, destroyed during the War of the Communities, and is the only part of the old temple that has survived to the present day. The cloister contains several tools that were used in the construction of the cathedral and gives access to the Chapter Room, the Room of Santa Catalina, the Room of Tapestries and Liturgical Ornaments and the Painting Room.

=== Chapter Hall ===
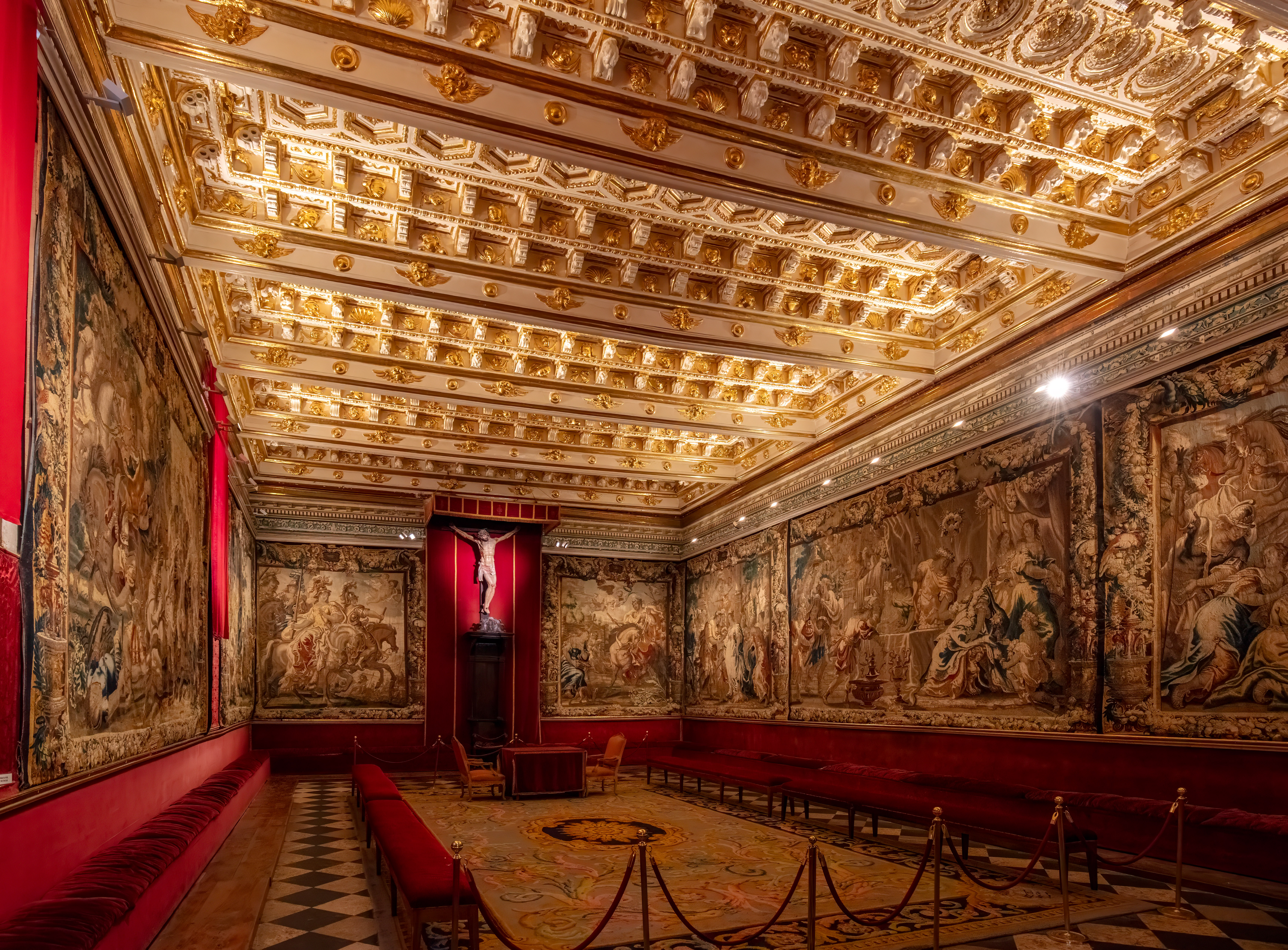
Chapter Hall

The Sala Capitular, former meeting room of the Cabildo, was built under the orders of Garcia Cubillas in the mid-sixteenth century. The room is decorated with a series of tapestries “Zenobia, Queen of Palmyra”, which is the most relevant and best preserved of the other three collections kept in the temple. It is composed of eleven tapestries woven in Brussels by Geeraert Peemans and narrates the life of Queen Zenobia and Emperor Aurelian.

An important part of the whole of the Chapter House are the coffered ceilings of the late sixteenth century, white stuccoed and laminated in gold in the seventeenth century, the work of Francisco Lopez, which are preserved in perfect condition thanks to the environmental conditions of the room.

At the back of the room is the bishop's seat and above it, the image of a Christ of the XVII century, previously located in the chapel of the Conception. At the entrance there is a classicist baroque style altarpiece that contains a carving of the Virgin of the Conception, made by the sculptor José Esteve.

=== Tapestry and Liturgical Ornaments room ===
The Hall of Tapestries and Liturgical Ornaments was inaugurated in 2017 after a series of reforms to make it visitable, the space previously housed the cathedral's bookstore until 1975, when the books and documents were moved to their current location.

In the room you can observe a series of tapestries called “The Planets”, made in Brussels during the 16th century. Two large showcases display liturgical vestments that belonged to the Segovian bishops Arias Dávila and Fadrique de Portugal.

=== Paint Museum ===
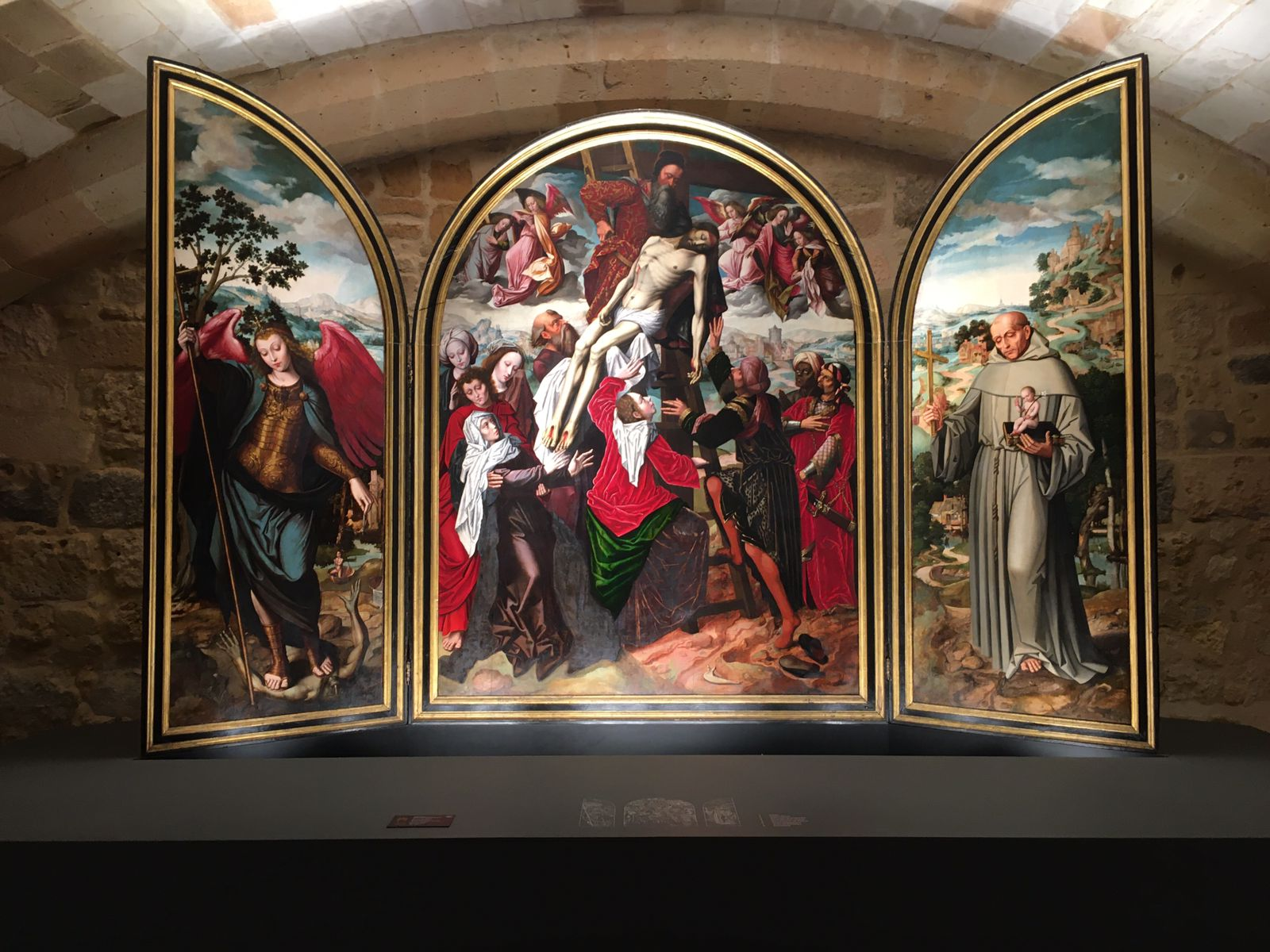
Trptych of the Descent of the Cross

The painting room contains forty-two Castilian and Flemish works; of great religious and artistic value, the latter due to the variety of painting methods of some works such as oil on copper or oil under glass. The most outstanding works are: “La Virgen con el Niño”, by Luis de Morales, La Duda de santo Tomás, by Alonso Sánchez Coello, La fuente de la Gracia, an original copy from the workshop of Jan van Eyck and La misa de san Gregorio, by Pedro Berruguete.

The central work of the exhibition is the Triptych of the Descent from the Cross, by Ambrosius Benson, formerly located in the church of Saint Michael.

=== Room of Saint Catherine (former Chapel of Saint Catherine) ===
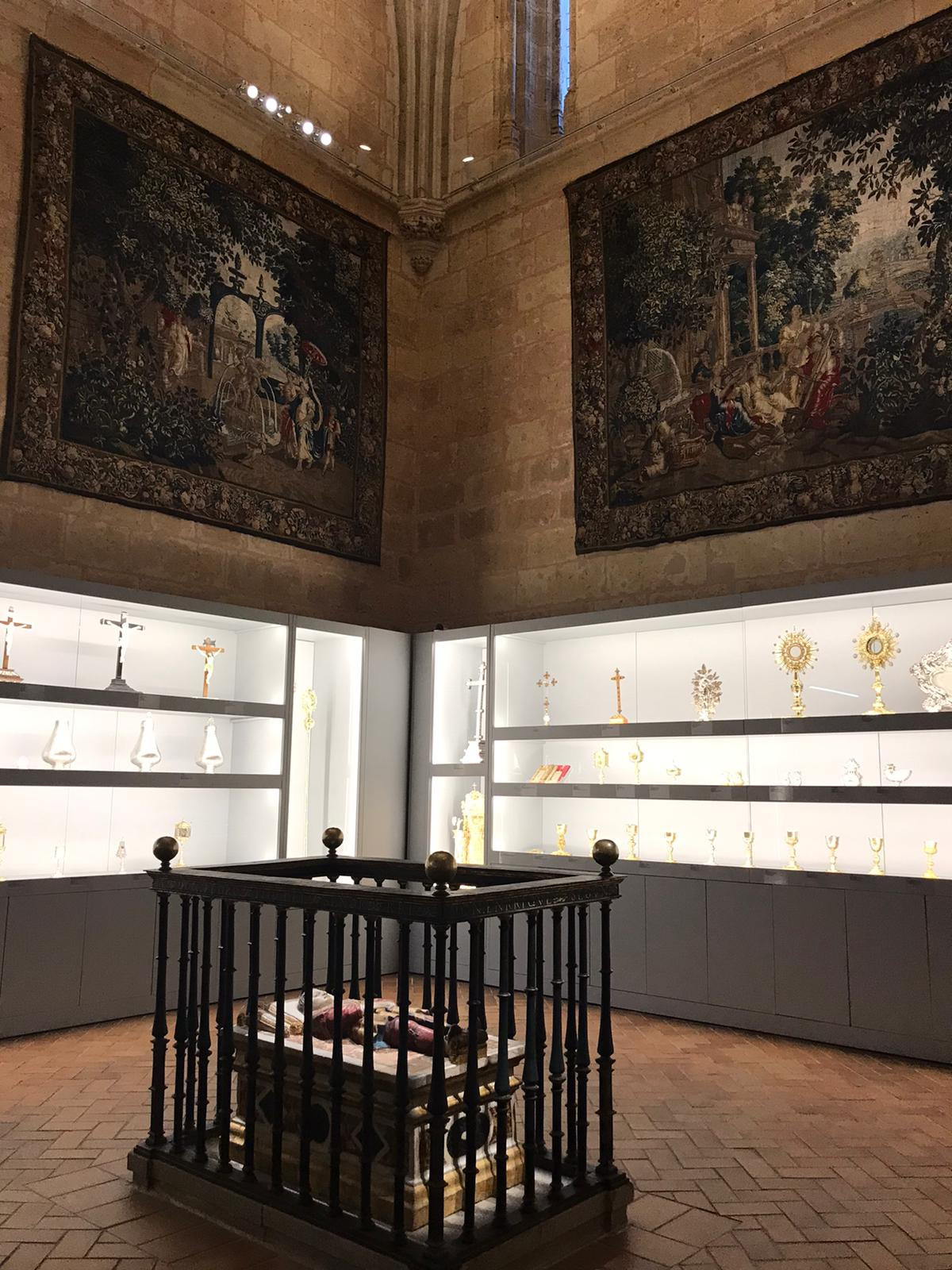
Room of Saint Catherine

The room of Santa Catalina, formerly a chapel, is dedicated to the exhibition of liturgical ornaments, relics, tapestries and the tomb of the Infante Don Pedro, son of Henry II. The room occupies the first body of the tower of the cathedral and was one of the first parts to be built, the works were put in charge of García de Cubillas with the supervision of Juan Gil de Hontañón, in 1528 the stained glass windows were placed in the chapel, work of Alberto de Holanda and in 1530 the vault was finished.

On July 24, 1924, by orders of the bishop of Segovia, Manuel Castro Alonso, the room ceased to be used as a chapel and became a cathedral museum, which enjoyed great importance thanks to the valuable set of ornaments and goldsmith work it contained along with the collection of Flemish tapestries woven in Oudenaarde during the 17th century, belonging to the “Vegetables” series, which represent various palace scenes.

In 2019 work began on the restoration of the room, which was interrupted by the health crisis of the Covid, being completed in 2022, during this restoration three bones and a garment were found under the tomb of the Infant, which thanks to an investigation conducted by the University of Granada in 2020 it could be demonstrated that belonged to the Infant and it was possible to calculate the age he would have at death, between 6 and 12 months. Currently the vestments, together with the bones and a facsimile of the Synodal of Aguilafuente are exhibited on a lateral of the room.

== See also ==
- Roman Catholic Diocese of Segovia
- List of cathedrals in Spain
