= Sepúlveda, Segovia =

Sepúlveda
- Municipality
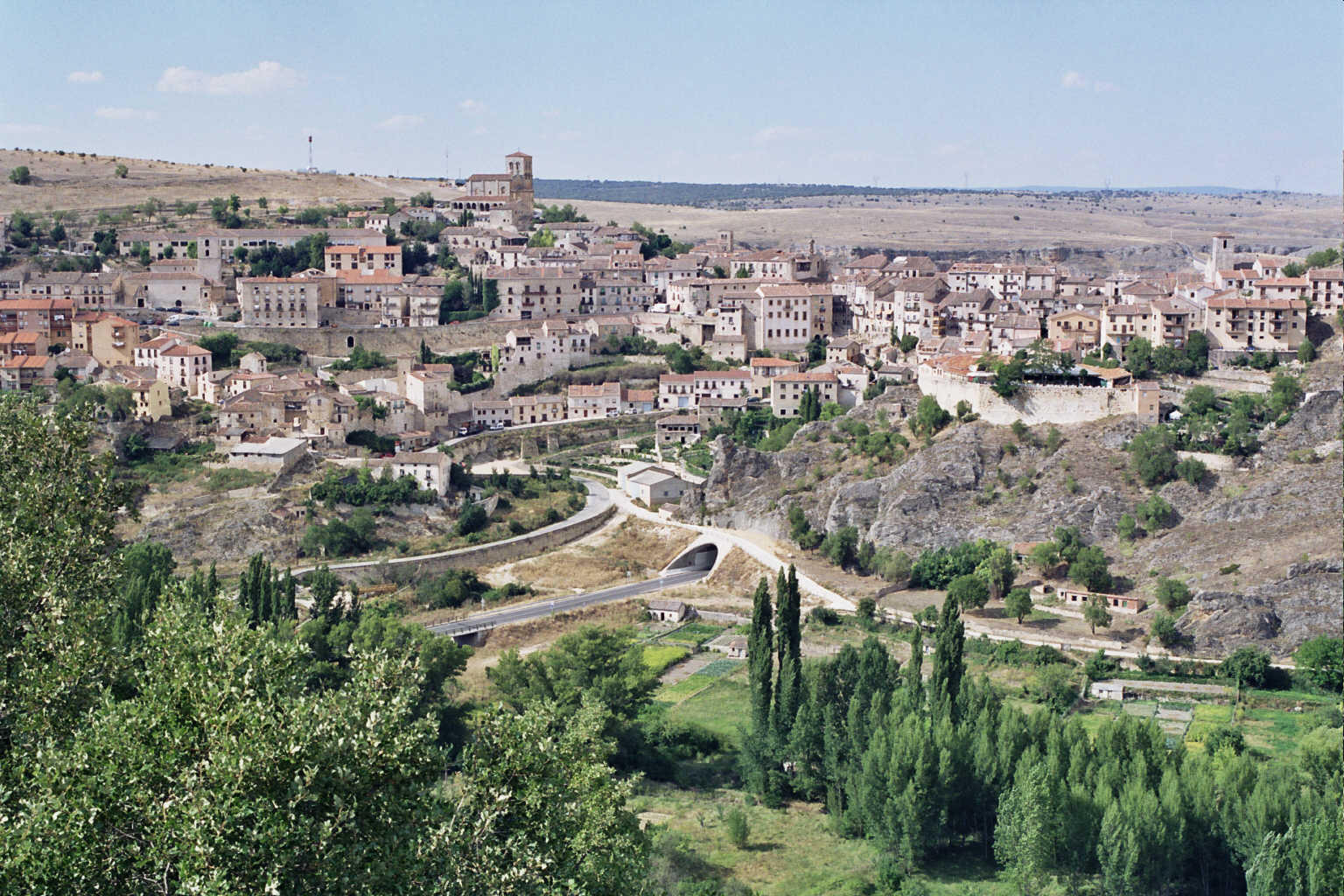

- Flag Coat of arms

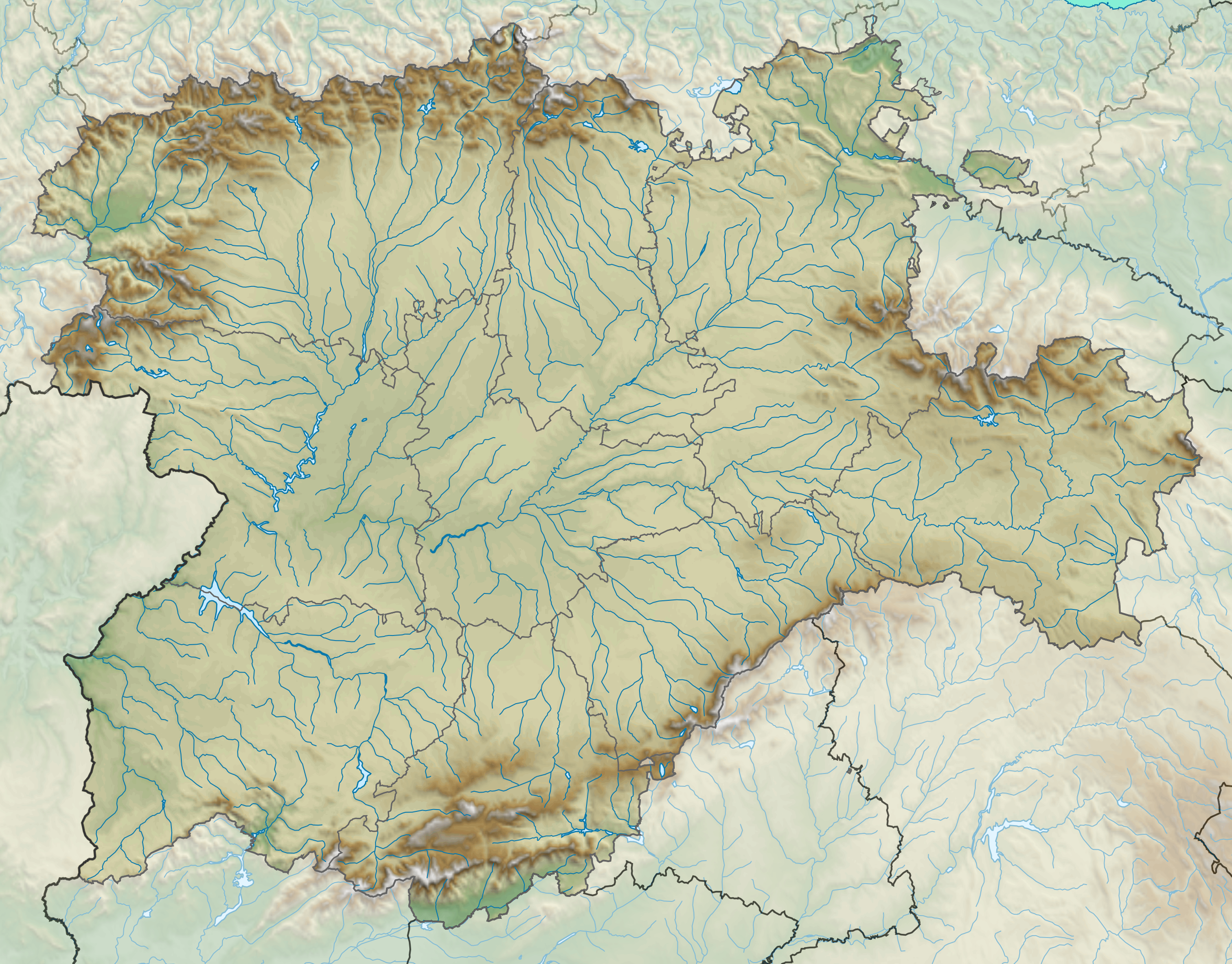
- Location within Spain Location within Castile and León
- Coordinates: 41°17′51″N 3°44′58″W
- Country: Spain
- Autonomous community: Castile and León
- Province: Segovia

Area
  - Total: 123.99 km^{2} (47.87 sq mi)
- Elevation: 1,009 m (3,310 ft)

Population (2025-01-01)
  - Total: 979
  - Density: 7.90/km^{2} (20.5/sq mi)
- Time zone: UTC+1 (CET)
  - Summer (DST): UTC+2 (CEST)
- Website: Official website

Sepúlveda is a municipality located in the province of Segovia, Castile and León, Spain. The town lies next to the Hoces del Rio Duratón National Park and incorporates the district of Duratón.

== History ==
The town of Sepúlveda is first mentioned in the Chronicle of Alfonso III. It referred to their depopulation as a result of the raids of Alfonso I. In 940 it was ruled by Fernán González of Castile, who stabilized a Christian area beyond the Duero River.

In 1110, Sepulveda lands hosted the Battle of Candespina, in which Alfonso I of Aragon and Count Henry of Portugal fought and defeated Urraca of León and Castile. This victory resulted in the independence of Portugal.

During the Peninsular War, Sepúlveda witnessed the only battle in which Napoleon's Imperial Guard fought. This action is settled with a failure for the French that fail to destroy the Spanish forces, first withdraw to Sepúlveda and then, undisturbed, for Segovia. The action was to delay Napoleon's advance towards Madrid before the Battle of Somosierra. Sepúlveda was besieged by French troops and Juan Martín Díez (which was based in the caves of Duratón River Canyon) acted.

== Culture ==
A legend tells of the struggle of González and Mayor Abubad Muslim. This legend is reflected on the facade of the "Casa del Moro". González gave Sepulveda a charter to assist in their recruitment.

Sepúlveda attracts visitors for cultural and gastronomic pursuits; a number of traditional restaurants serve roasted cordero and cochinillo.
