= Sebúlcor =

- Municipality
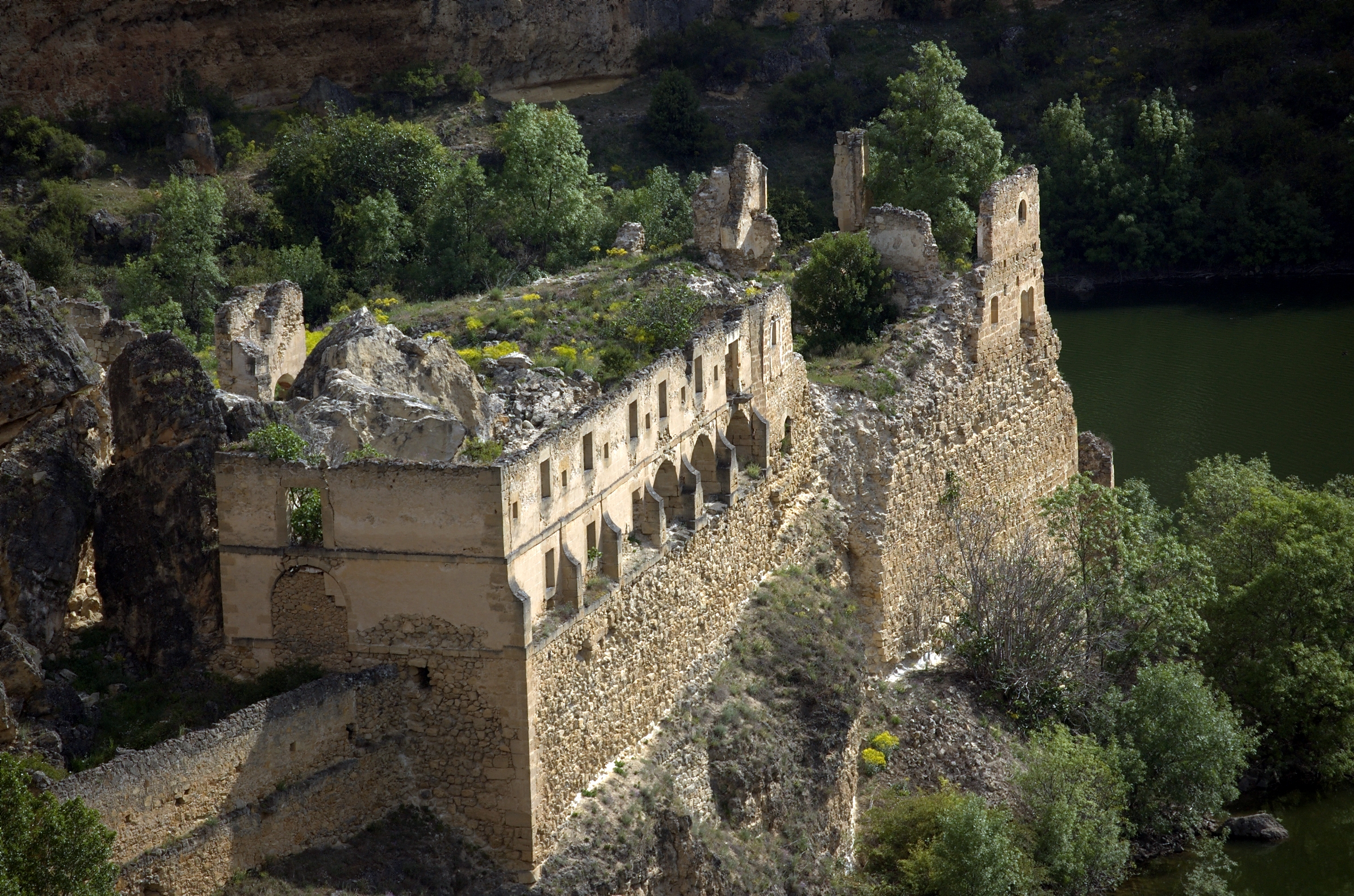

- Flag Coat of arms

- Location in Spain. Sebúlcor (Spain)
- Coordinates: 41°16′16″N 3°53′03″W
- Country: Spain
- Autonomous community: Castile and León
- Province: Segovia
- Municipality: Sebúlcor

Area
  - Total: 27.71 km^{2} (10.70 sq mi)
- Elevation: 940 m (3,080 ft)

Population (2025-01-01)
  - Total: 239
  - Density: 8.63/km^{2} (22.3/sq mi)
- Time zone: UTC+1 (CET)
  - Summer (DST): UTC+2 (CEST)
- Website: Official website

Sebúlcor is a municipality located in the province of Segovia, Castile and León, Spain. According to the 2004 census (INE), the municipality had a population of 283 inhabitants.
