= Alexis Frutos Vaesken =

Paraguayan lawyer and diplomat

Alexis Manuel Frutos Vaesken (17 October 1934 – 18 March 1996) was a Paraguayan lawyer and diplomat.

He studied law at the National University of Asunción.

He served as Foreign Minister of Paraguay under Andrés Rodríguez Pedotti (1990–1993).
