= Saint Fructus =

Castilian hermit saint of the eighth century

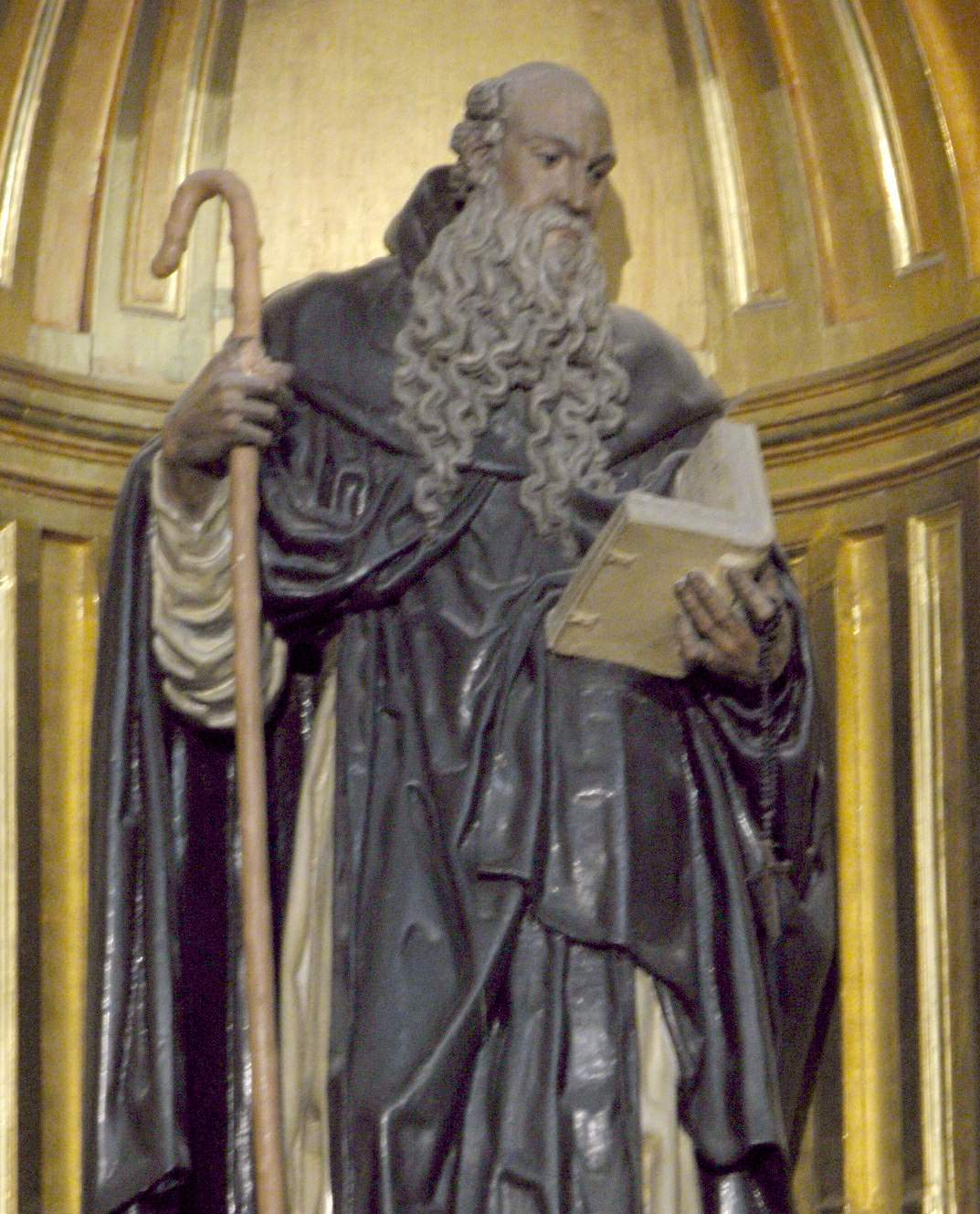
- Born: ~642 (Fructus); Segovia
- Died: 715 AD
- Venerated in: Eastern Orthodox Church; Roman Catholic Church
- Major shrine: Segovia
- Feast: 25 October
- Patronage: Segovia

Saint Fructus (Spanish: San Fruitos, Frutos, Fructos) was a Castilian hermit of the eighth century venerated as a saint. Christian tradition states that he had two siblings, named Valentine (Valentín) and Engratia (Engracia). They all lived as hermits on a mountain in the region of Sepúlveda. Engratia should not be confused with the 4th-century Portuguese martyr of the same name.

Born in the 7th century to a noble family of Segovia, Fructus and his two siblings sold their family possessions after their parents' death and gave the earnings to poor. Wishing to escape from the city and the turbulent times, they established themselves on the rocky terrain near the village of Sepulveda now known as the Hoces del Duratón, where they lived apart from one another in caves that ensured them complete solitude.

Tradition holds that Valentine and Engratia were later martyred around 715 by advancing Moorish forces, and that Fructus died of natural causes in the same year at the age of 73.

== Legends ==
A legend states that some locals, wishing to join Fructus in his retreat to his death, traveled there, only to be pursued by Moorish forces to the very door of Fructus’ hermitage. Fructus attempted to convert the Muslim soldiers, but without success. The legend goes on to state that Fructus drew a line across the earth, asking that the Moorish forces not cross it. When they ignored him and attempted to cross, the earth miraculously opened up to swallow them up, at a crack in the rock now called La Cuchillada. From that point on, the Moors did not bother Fructus.

== Veneration ==
They are venerated as the patron saints of Segovia, where their relics are enshrined and are recognized as saints of the Orthodox Patriarchate of Rome.

Fructus, Valentine and Engratia are commemorated on 25 October by Western Rite Orthodox communities, and in the Roman Catholic Church.

Their relics were conserved in the hermitage of San Frutos from the 8th century to the 11th, when they were translated to Segovia Cathedral. The area of Fructus' hermitage suffered various political and military vicissitudes; this area was conquered by Fernán González before being annexed by Al-Mansur Ibn Abi Aamir in 984. It fell to Christian control once again in 1011 through the efforts of Sancho García of Castile, and in 1076 was repopulated by Alfonso VI of Castile. By the 1070s, the Benedictines had established a church in honor of Saint Fructus in the area, as well as an adjoining monastery.

On the night of 24 October is celebrated the procession in honor of Fructus known as the Paso de la Hoja ("Turn of the Page"). A sculpture of Fructus rests in a niche in this cathedral. This sculpture has Fructus holding a book; according to local legend, it is the “Book of Life”: when Fructus turns to the last page, the world will end.

Fructus' feast day is celebrated with music and contests, and devotees also celebrate his feast day at the park of Hoces del Río Duratón, where they accompany a statue of Fructus.

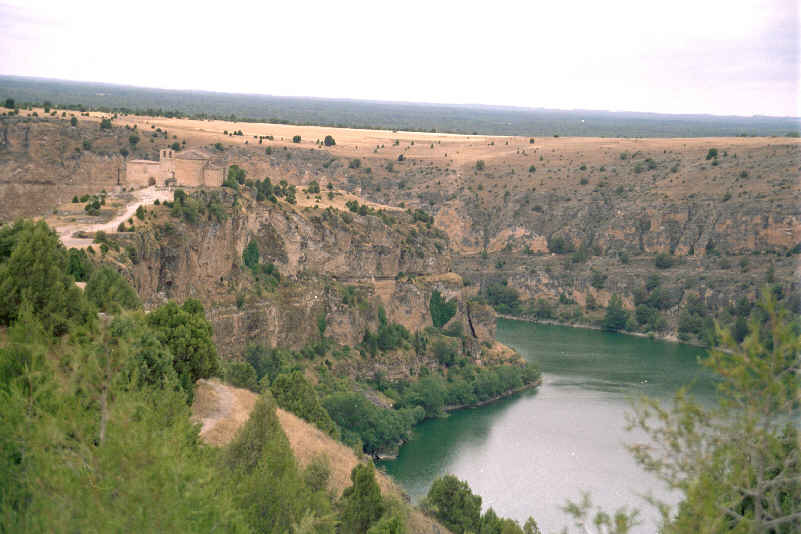
The Duratón River and the hermitage of Saint Fructus

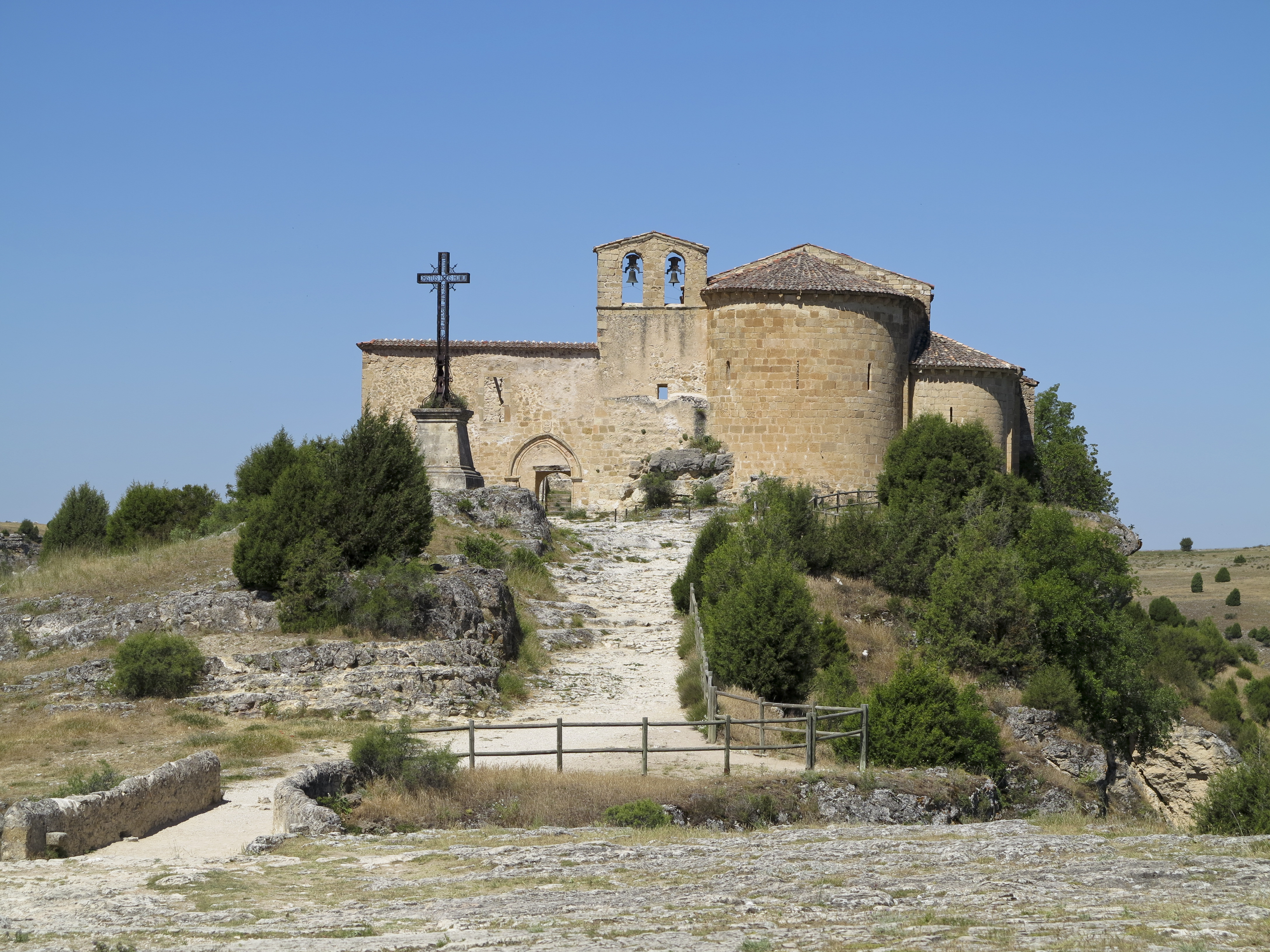
Church and monastery of San Frutos in Sepúlveda, Segovia
