= Carrascal del Río =

- Municipality
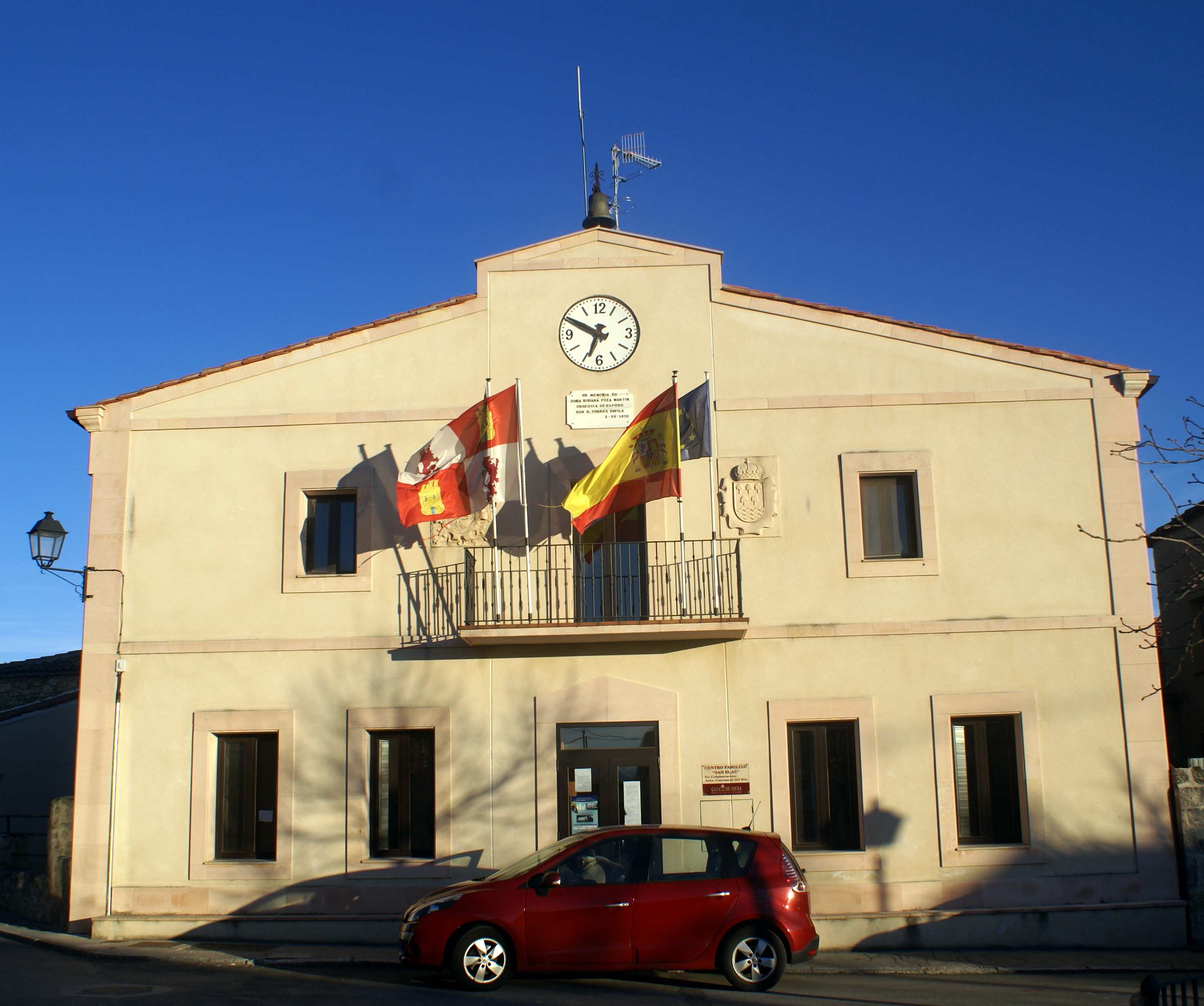
- Town hall of Carrascal del Río, Segovia, Spain.

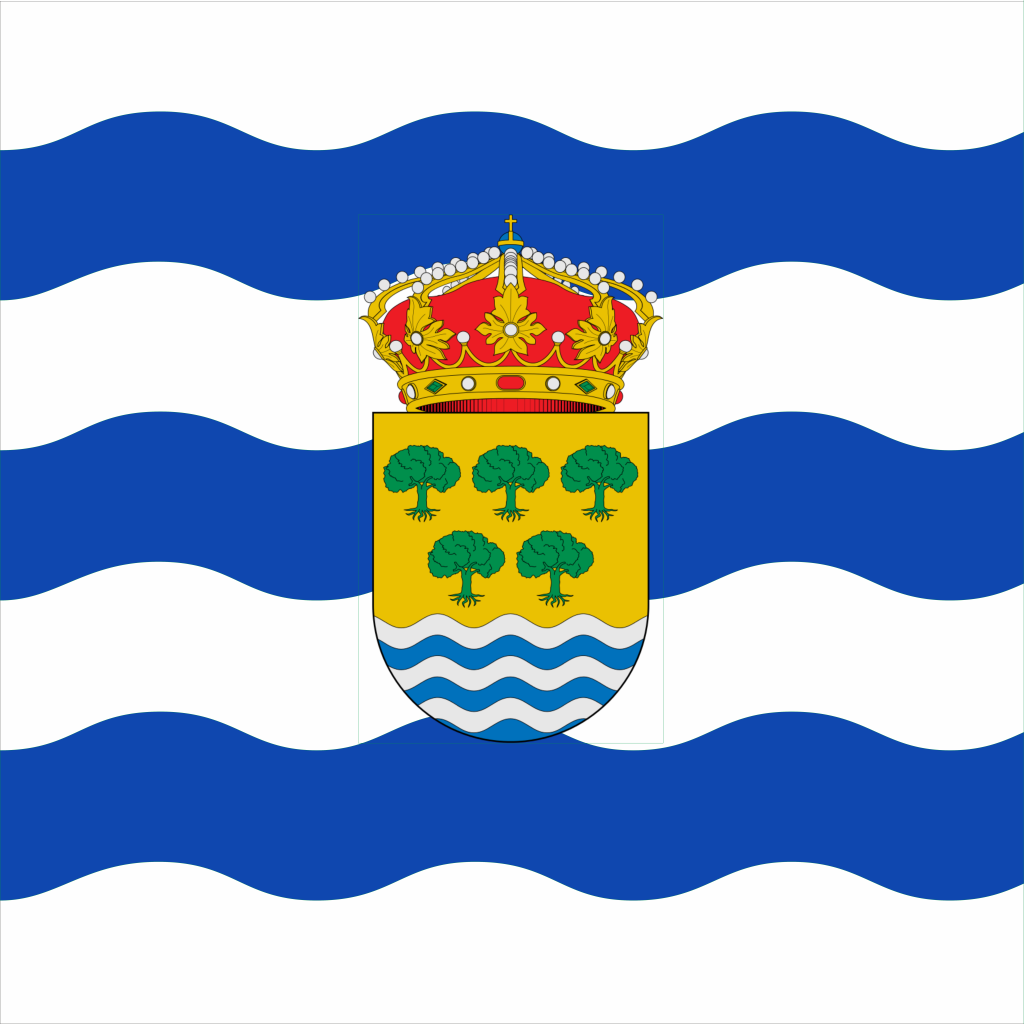
- Flag Coat of arms

- Location in Spain. Carrascal del Río (Spain)
- Coordinates: 41°22′03″N 3°53′51″W
- Country: Spain
- Autonomous community: Castile and León
- Province: Segovia
- Municipality: Carrascal del Río

Area
  - Total: 30 km^{2} (12 sq mi)

Population (2025-01-01)
  - Total: 143
  - Density: 4.8/km^{2} (12/sq mi)
- Time zone: UTC+1 (CET)
  - Summer (DST): UTC+2 (CEST)
- Website: Official website

Carrascal del Río is a municipality located in the province of Segovia, Castile and León, Spain. According to the 2004 census (INE), the municipality has a population of 201 inhabitants.
