= Duratón (river) =

River in Spain

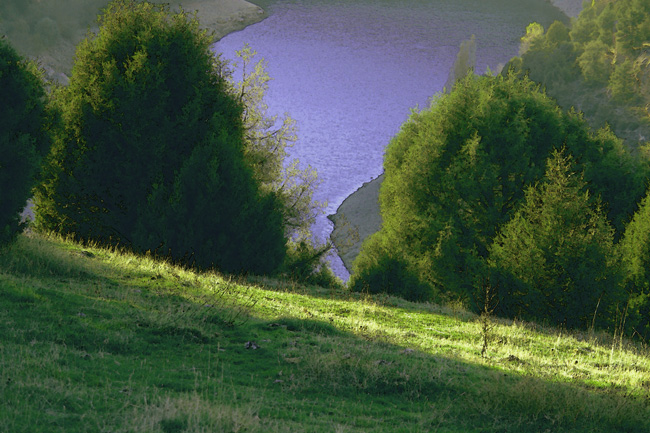
Duratón in November 2006

The Duratón River (Spanish: Río Duratón) is a river in the Segovia and Valladolid provinces of Spain, a tributary of the Douro.

== See Also ==
Duratón River Gorges Natural Park
