= Colegio de San Gregorio =

Museum and former college in Valladolid, Spain

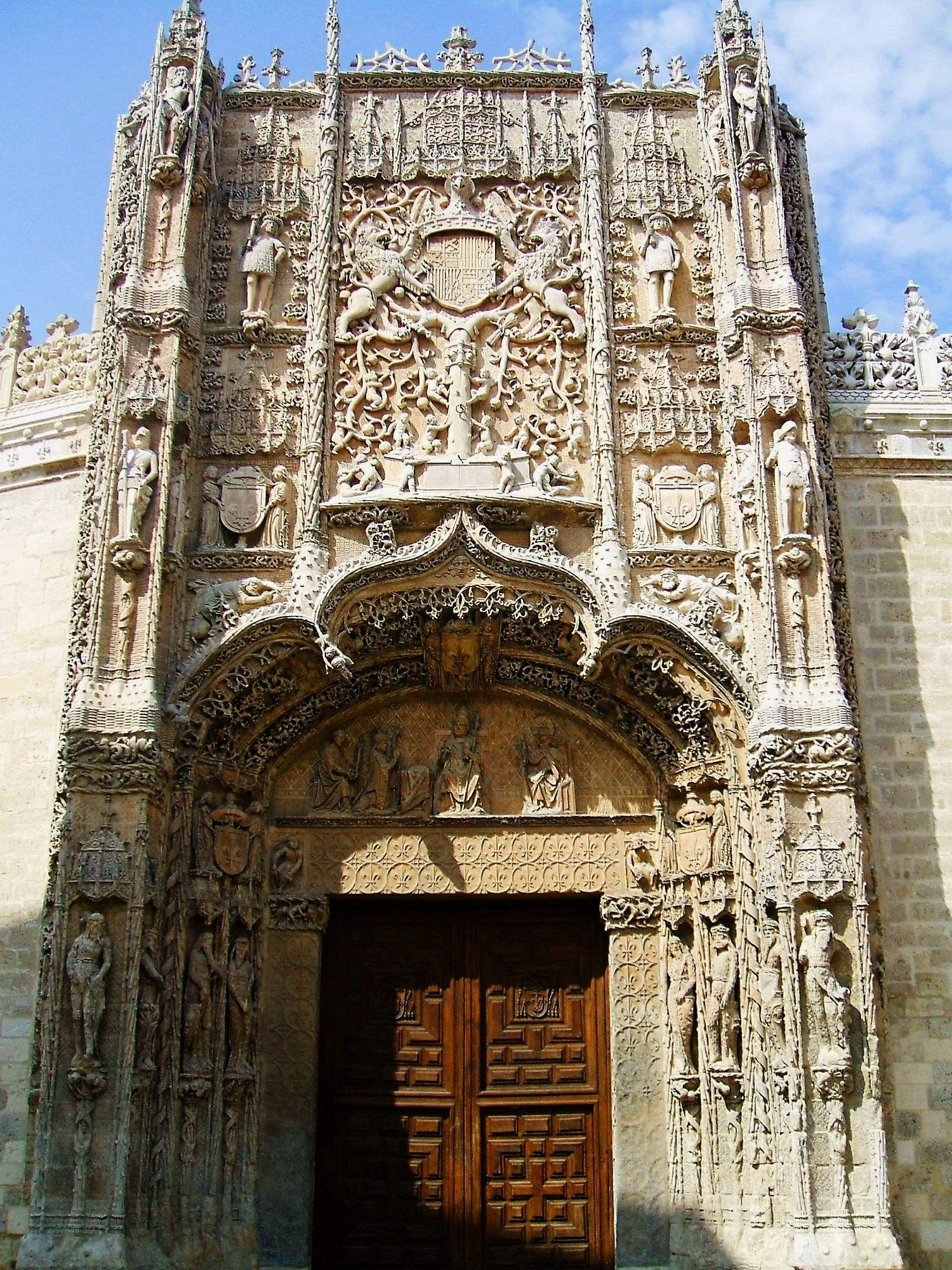
- View of the main facade

General information
- Type: Formerly a college, currently a museum
- Architectural style: Isabelline, Mudéjar.
- Location: Campiña del Pisuerga, Castile and León, Valladolid, Spain
- Coordinates: 41°39′26″N 4°43′24″W
- Opened: 1487

Design and construction
- Architects: Gil de Siloé, Simón de Colonia, Juan de Talavera, Juan Guas, Felipe Bigarny, Bartolomé Solórzano.

Website
- http://museoescultura.mcu.es/

The Colegio de San Gregorio is an Isabelline style building in the city of Valladolid, in Castile and León, Spain, it was formerly a college and now houses the National Museum of Sculpture. This building is one of the best examples of the Isabelline style, which is the characteristic architectural style of the Crown of Castile region during the Catholic Monarchs' reign (late-15th century to early-16th century). Its courtyard and façade are noted for their refined decoration, elegant proportions and symbolism. It was founded as a teaching institution. Originally a theological college for Dominican friars, it acquired a doctrinal authority and acted as a spiritual and political centre in Renaissance and Baroque Castile.

== History ==
The University of Valladolid was founded in the 13th century during Alfonso X of Castile's reign; as in other countries, it was divided into constituent colleges. In Valladolid the Colegio Mayor Santa Cruz was also created in the late 15th century.

The creation of the college, dedicated to Saint Gregory the Great, was the work of the Dominican friar Alonso de Burgos, the Catholic Monarchs' confessor and Bishop of the dioceses of Córdoba, Cuenca and Palencia. The foundation was confirmed by a papal bull of Pope Innocent VIII in 1487, and continued by Queen Isabella in 1500, after the founder's death. The college was attached to the Convento de San Pablo, of which Alonso had been prior, and was subject to the Capilla del Crucifijo (Crucifix Chapel), to the south of the Dominican church. This was to become Alonso's own funeral chapel, and later also served as the college chapel.

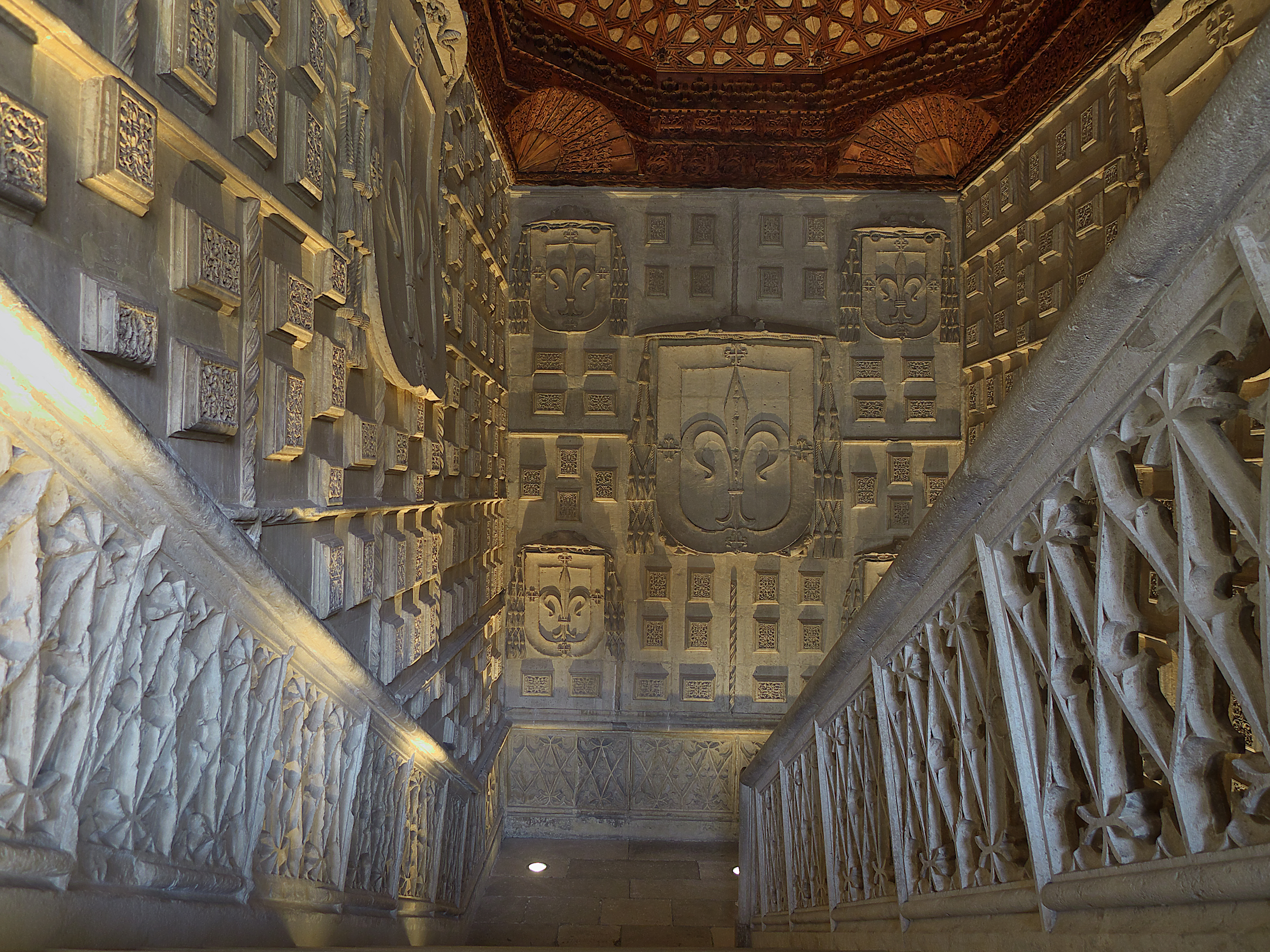
The heraldic crown coronet of the college's founder Alonso de Burgos was the fleur-de-lis, this is spread through most of the building (image of the Monumental staircase).

Construction of the chapel began in 1484, with the rest of the buildings following from 1488. The carved shields in the corners of the courtyard still do not bear the pomegranates symbolising Granada, suggesting that this part was completed before the conquest of Granada in 1492. The façade, the final part to be constructed, is assumed to have been completed in 1498. There is little documentary reference to the construction, making the identities of the architects and artists unclear. Alonso's mortuary chapel is attributed to Juan Guas and Juan de Talavera, the high altar and original founder's tomb to Simón de Colonia, the replacement tomb to Felipe Bigarny, and the altarpiece to Gil de Siloé and Diego de la Cruz. In 1524 a four-storey wing (the Edificio de las Azoteas) was added between the college and the chapel, designed by Gaspar de Solórzano.

The college trained a number of prominent Renaissance jurists, theologians and philosophers, like Bartolomé de las Casas, Melchor Cano, Luis de Granada and Francisco de Vitoria. In 1550–51 the college hosted the Valladolid debate, in which Bartolomé de las Casas defended the indigenous peoples of the Americas' rights, against Juan Ginés de Sepúlveda, a supporter of the dominion of the conquistadors over the Indigenous, whom he considered inferior beings. In 1577, due to the beneficence of Juan Solano, the former bishop of Cusco in Peru, the college served as a model for the transformation of the Dominican studium at Santa Maria sopra Minerva in Rome into the College of St. Thomas, forerunner of the Pontifical University of Saint Thomas Aquinas, Angelicum.

The college began to decline during the 18th century Englightenment. In the Napoleonic French invasion it was used as a barracks, and with the suppression of the Regular orders of 1820 it was abandoned, although in the Absolutist Restoration of 1823 it was briefly reoccupied. Finally, the confiscation and expropriation gave way to its use as a prison, dependencies for the Civil Government, National Institute, the Normal Schools of Teachers, etc. In 1884 it was declared a National Monument, but nonetheless the depredation of the buildings continued, with the Metaphysics Classroom, some roofs and the chapel corridor being lost.

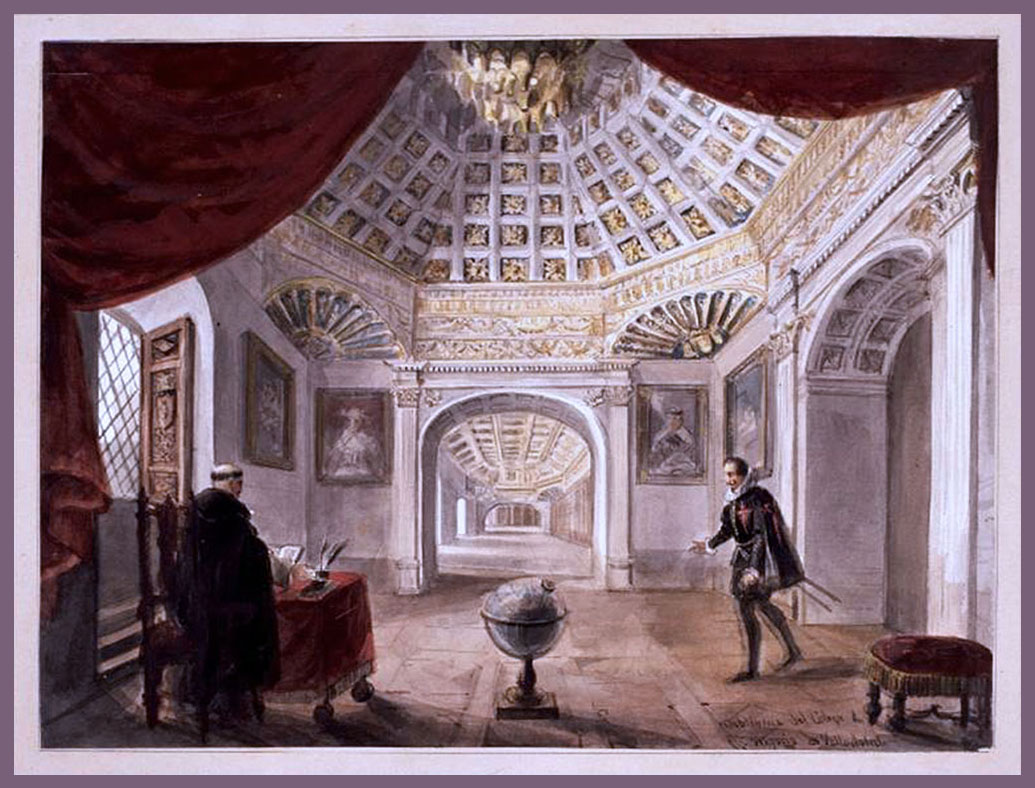
Library, by Valentín Carderera, circa 1837. Museo Lázaro Galdiano

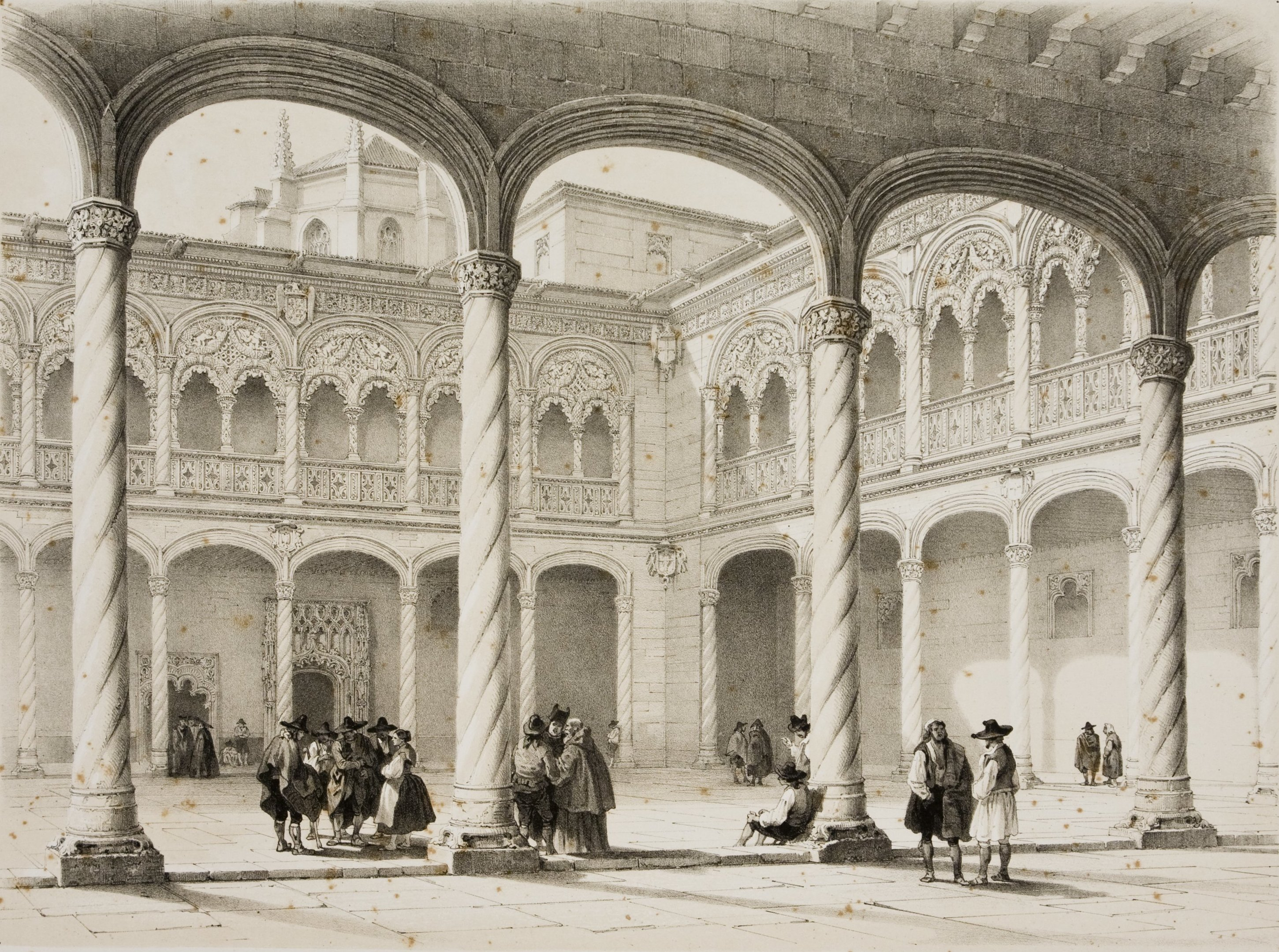
Patio Grande's cloister, circa 1850, by Jenaro Pérez Villaamil

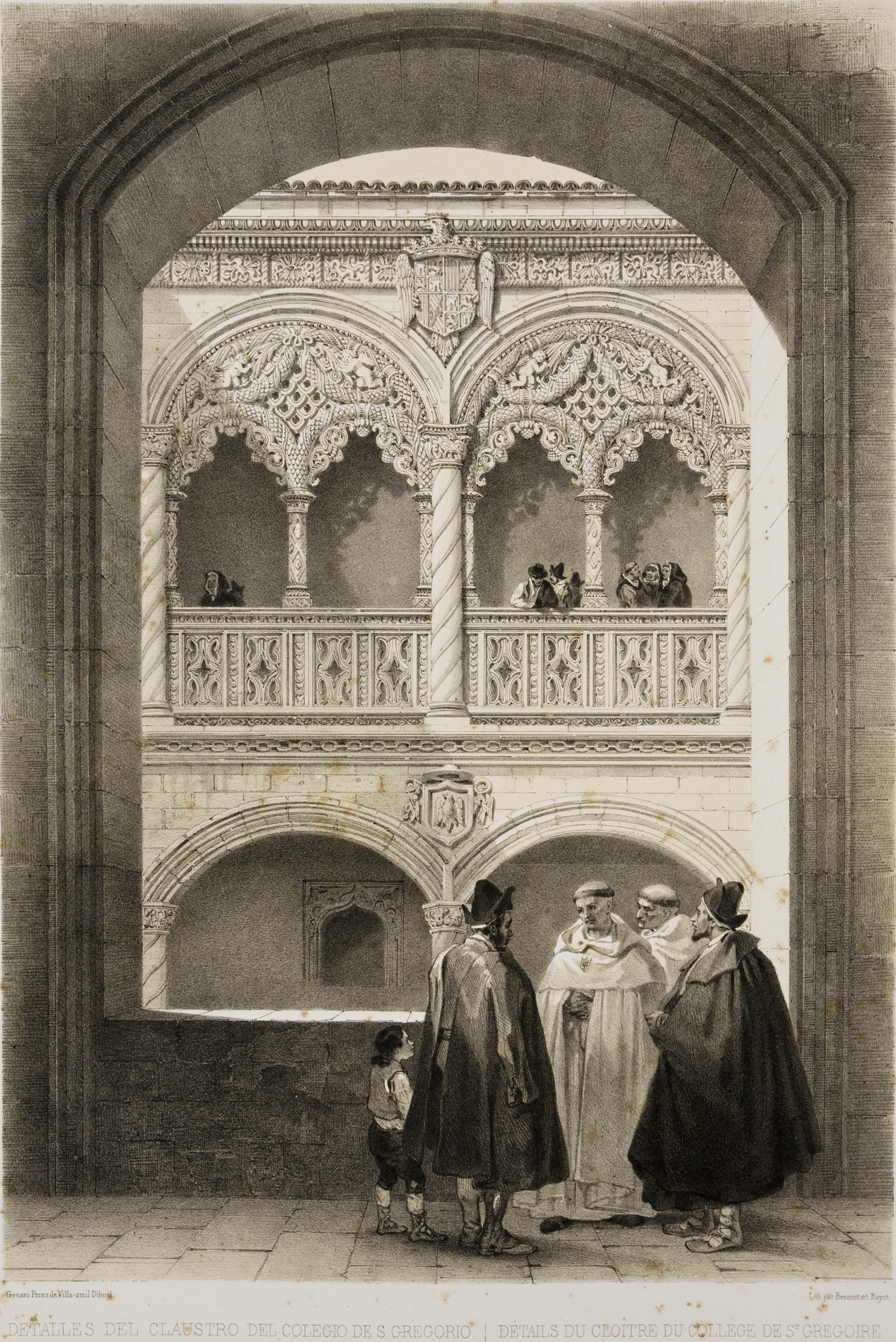
Isabelline windows in the Patio Grande's cloister, circa 1850, by Jenaro Pérez Villaamil, Philippe Benoist and Adolphe Jean-Baptiste Bayot

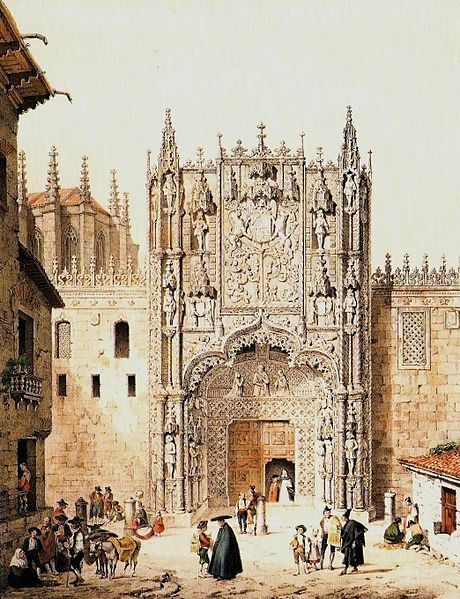
Main façade, circa 1850, by Jenaro Pérez Villaamil

== Description ==
The Colegio de San Gregorio consists of seven elements: the Portada monumental (main façade), the visitor reception area, the Chapel, the small Patio de los Estudios (Courtyard of the Studies), the larger Patio Grande (Great Courtyard), the Monumental Staircase, and the Edificio de las Azoteas (Building of the roofs). The museum's collections occupy the spaces around the Patio Grande and the Edificio de las Azoteas.

=== Façade ===
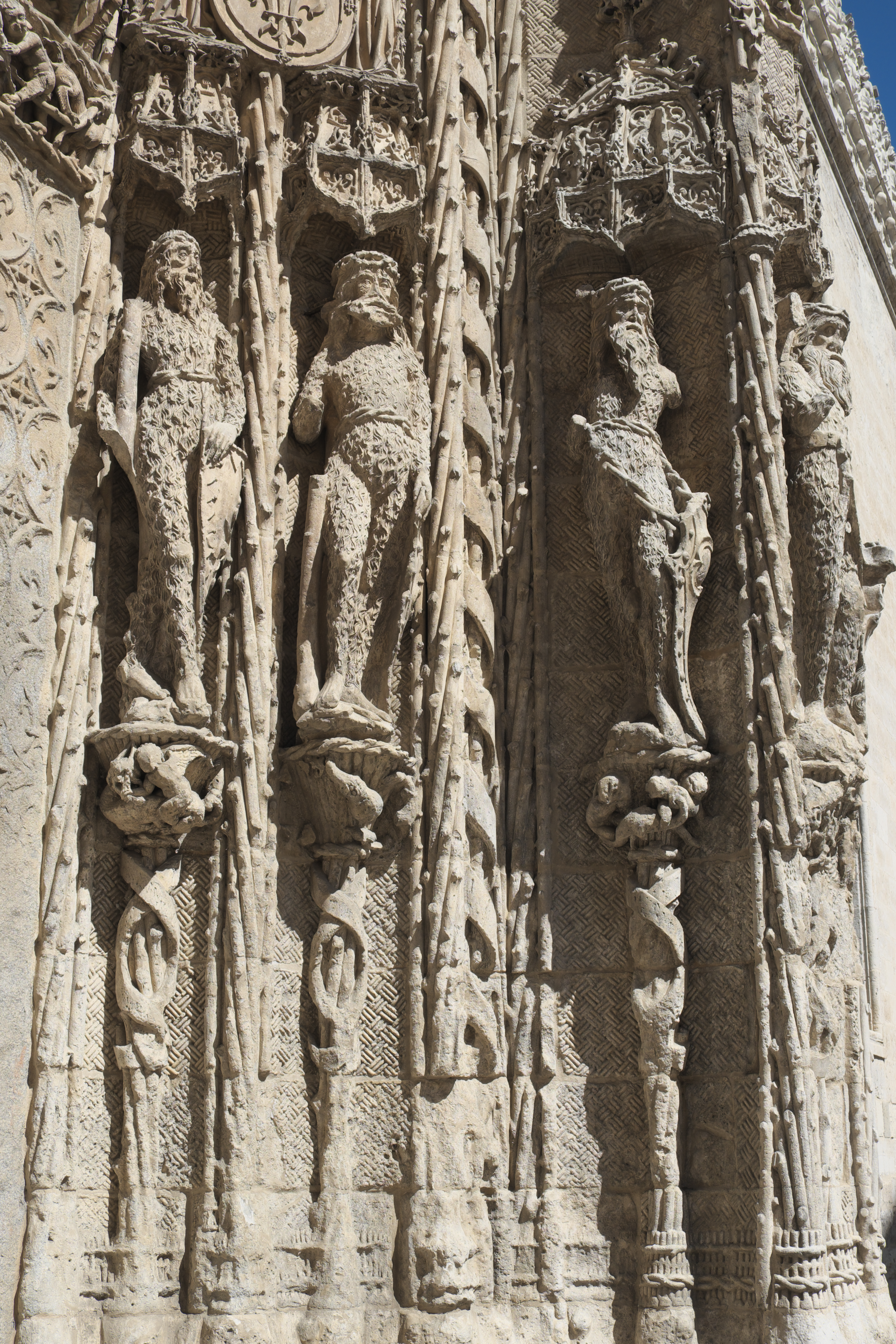
'Wild Men' on the main portal

The main façade faces south-east, onto the Plaza Frederico Wattenberg. It is austere, with the exception of the spectacular Isabelline portal. This has stylistic features linking it to the workshop of Gil de Siloé, who was working at that time in Burgos, on the Miraflores Charterhouse and the cathedral. The latter's Conception Chapel has similarities to the upper parts of the façade at the college. The centrepiece has two levels, framed by buttresses. The lower level contains the portal, while the upper is a solid wall of sculpture. All the architectural features are twisted and sprout the stubs of branches, giving the impression of being made of living trees.

The portal has a segmental arch, surrounded with a Mudéjar ogee trefoiled arch. Under the arch, the lintel is carved with Friar Alonso's fleur-de-lis device. The tympanum is carved with a scene of Friar Alonso offering the college to St Gregory in the presence of Saints Dominic and Paul, and may have been reused from an earlier building. The jambs and buttresses bear sixteen statues of 'wild men' with clubs. These had several possible symbolic connotations. They could have simply been a heraldic device, or have 'guarded' the building. They could also have had negative connotations, representing the uncivilised, un-Christianised savages seen in chivalric romances and plays, contrasting with the virtuous knights elsewhere on the façade. However, they may have been seen positively, denoting the sinless 'natural man', free from the impurities of society, like John the Baptist. The lower statues are completely covered with long hair, carrying weapons and shields decorated with demonic figures, except for one, who bears the cross of the knightly Order of Calatrava. The upper 'wild men' are very different, being without body hair and more 'human' in appearance. They have been considered by some authors to represent indigenous Americans, which would make them the oldest such depictions in Castile.

The upper register is divided into three sections by thin colonnettes. In the centre is a pomegranate tree, representing the conquest of Granada. The tree rises from a fountain, in which putti play. This could represent the Fountain of Youth, while the tree may also allude to the Tree of Knowledge. In the tree's canopy stand two lions supporting the arms of the Catholic Monarchs, with the Eagle of Saint John as a crest. The yoke and arrows are also present, again representing the monarchy. The side panels of the façade have more fleurs-de-lis and two kings of arms under elaborate canopies. Throughout the façade are smaller carved scenes relating the challenges to be overcome with study and the triumph of intelligence over heresy and temptation.

=== Patio de los Estudios ===
The Patio de los Estudios

The college is built around two courtyards. The small Patio de los Estudios (Courtyard of the Studies) is directly within the main entrance, in the manner of a Roman atrium. It is surrounded by a covered pentice, supported by shows lobed pillars topped with the founder's shields. Originally, this area housed the classrooms of Physics and Metaphysics (the latter ruined in the 20th century). The courtyard gives access to the chapel to the west and the Patio Grande to the right.

=== Chapel ===
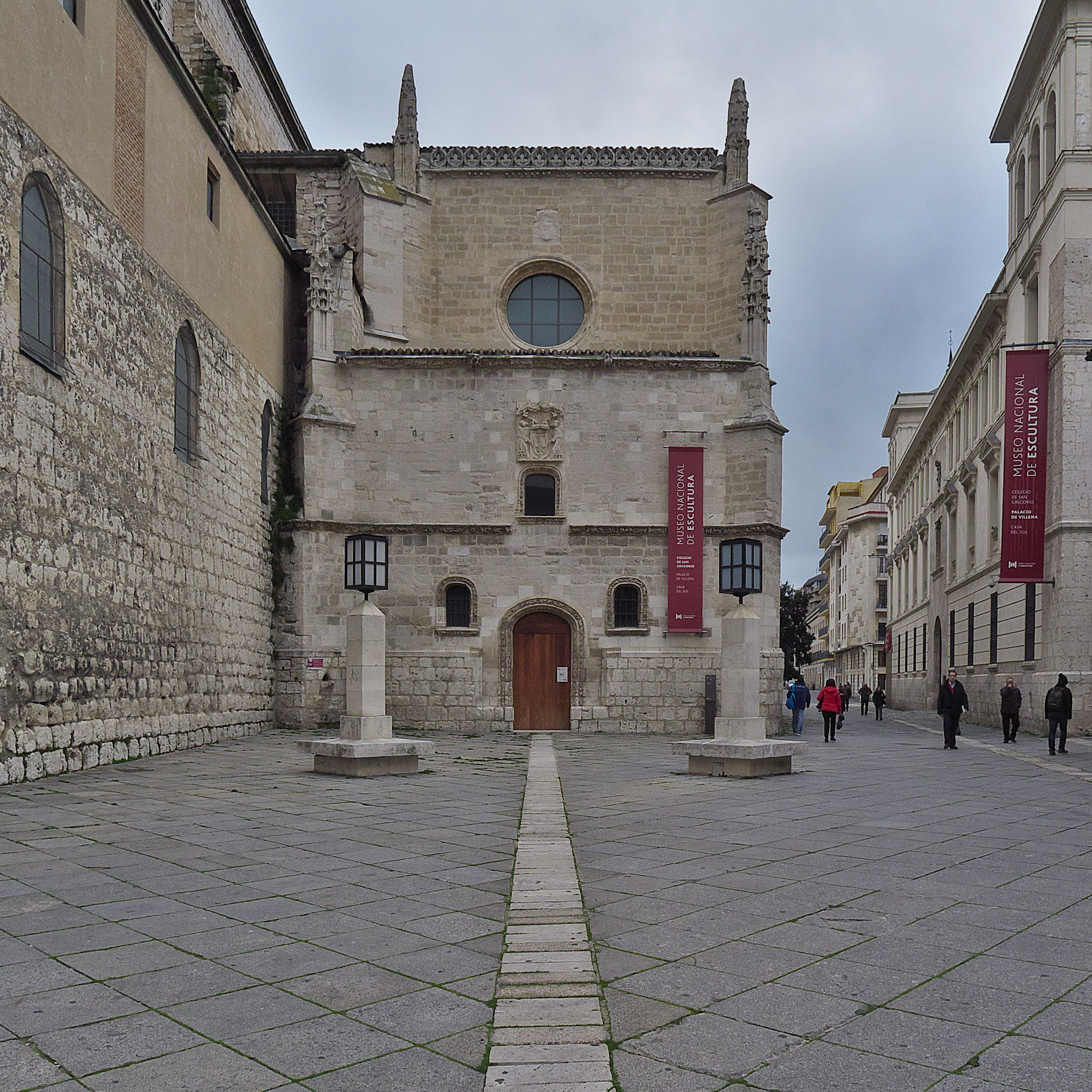
Façade of the chapel

The funerary chapel of Friar Alonso was originally accessed both from the college and from the south door of the Iglesia de San Pablo, today blocked. It was started in 1484 by Juan Guas and Juan de Talavera, and was completed in 1490. Its construction was not without incident, as the builders were fined for defective work. In 1499 Simón de Colonia was commissioned to add a two-storey sacristy and a (since demolished) corridor connecting with the college. The chapel is rectangular with a polygonal apse, and is covered with a lierne vault. The vault is carried on corbels and capitals decorated with angels bearing the founder's arms. At the west end is a tribune carrying the organ. The tribune formerly had an iron balustrade, replaced by a neo-Gothic parapet in the 1880s.

All the furnishings were destroyed by Napoleonic forces in the Peninsular War, including Friar Alonso's tomb by Felipe Bigarny and the altarpiece by Gil de Siloé. However, the chapel still retains other carved tombs.

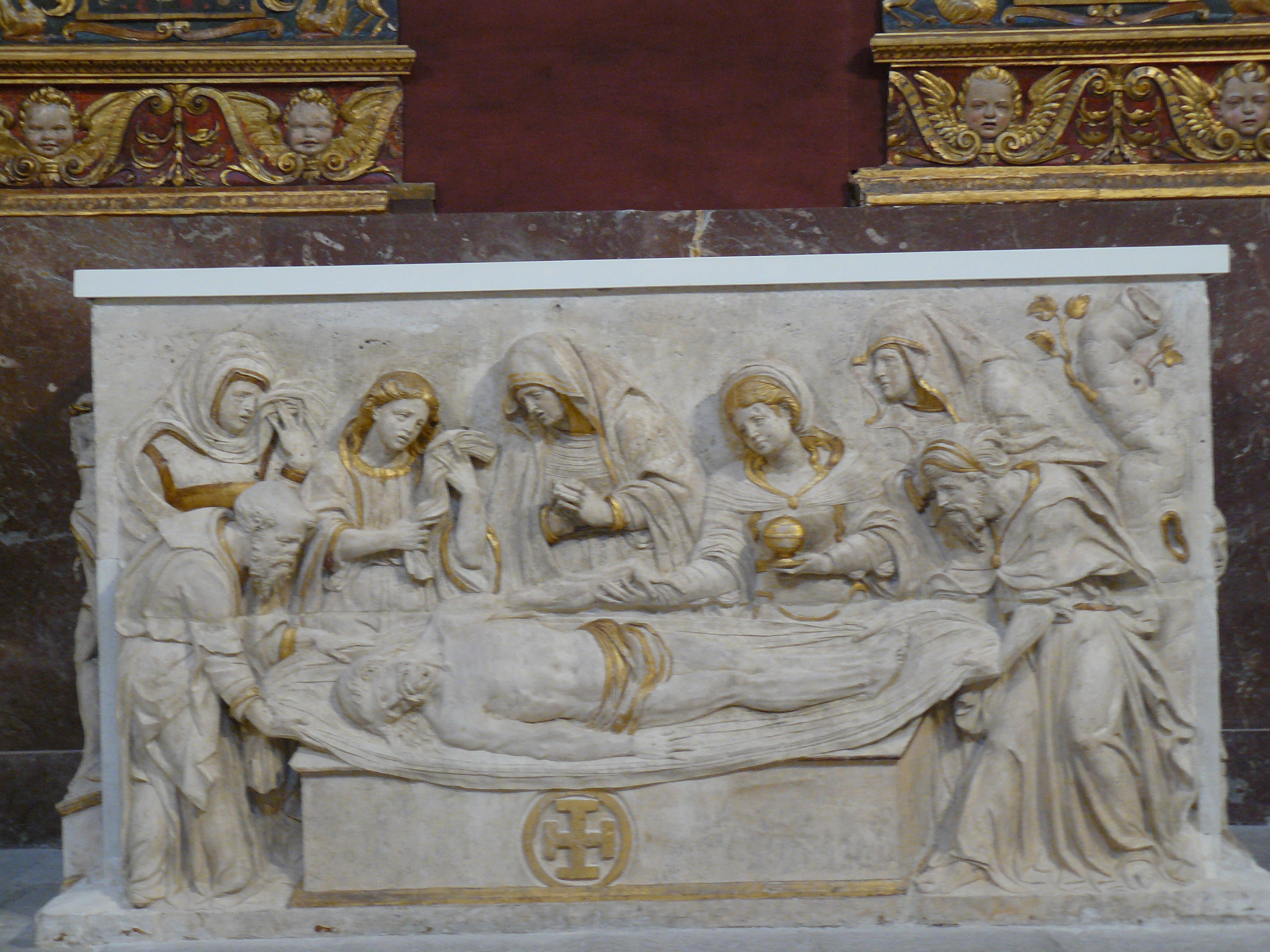

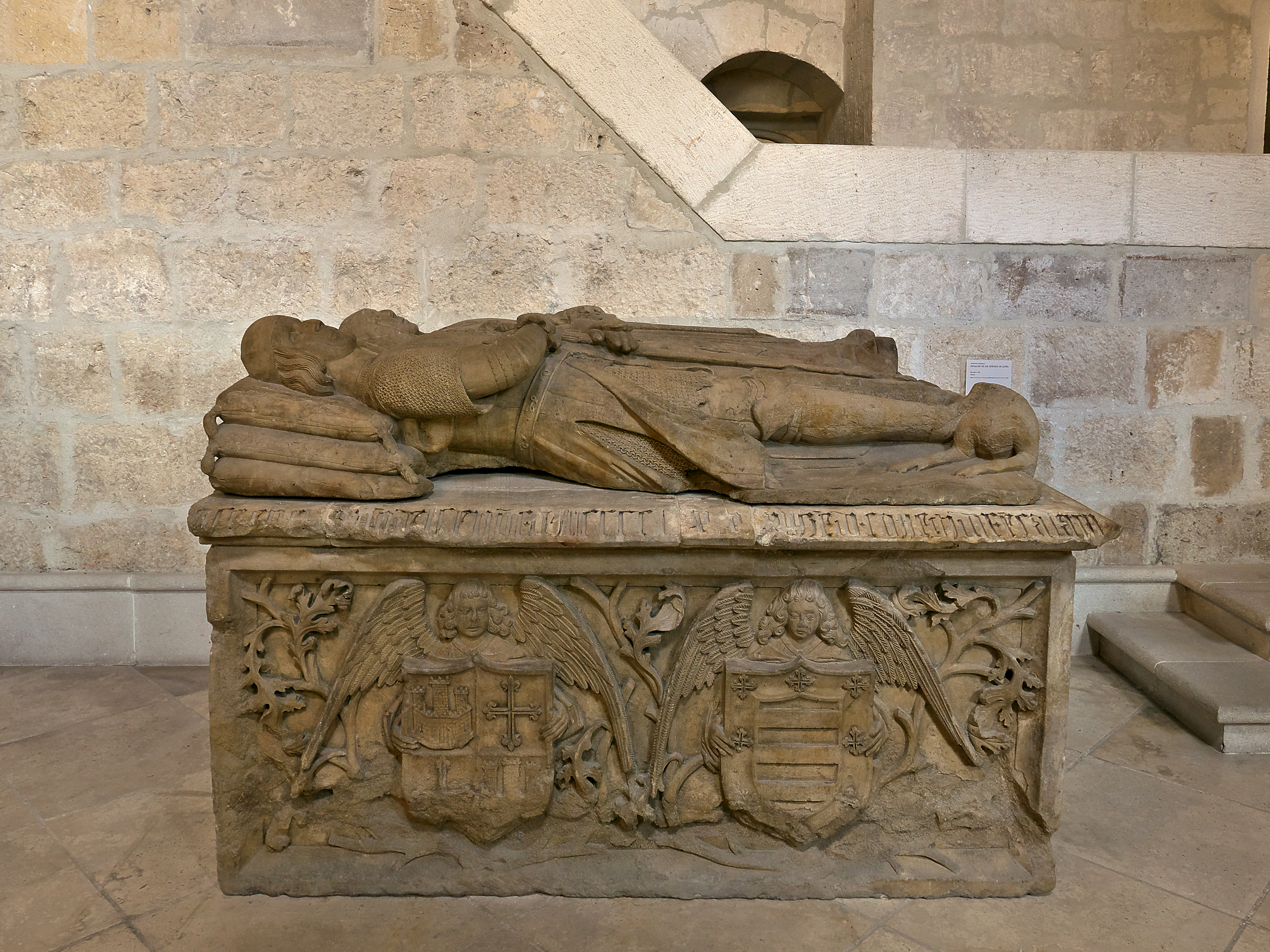
Sepulchre of the Lord of Cotes

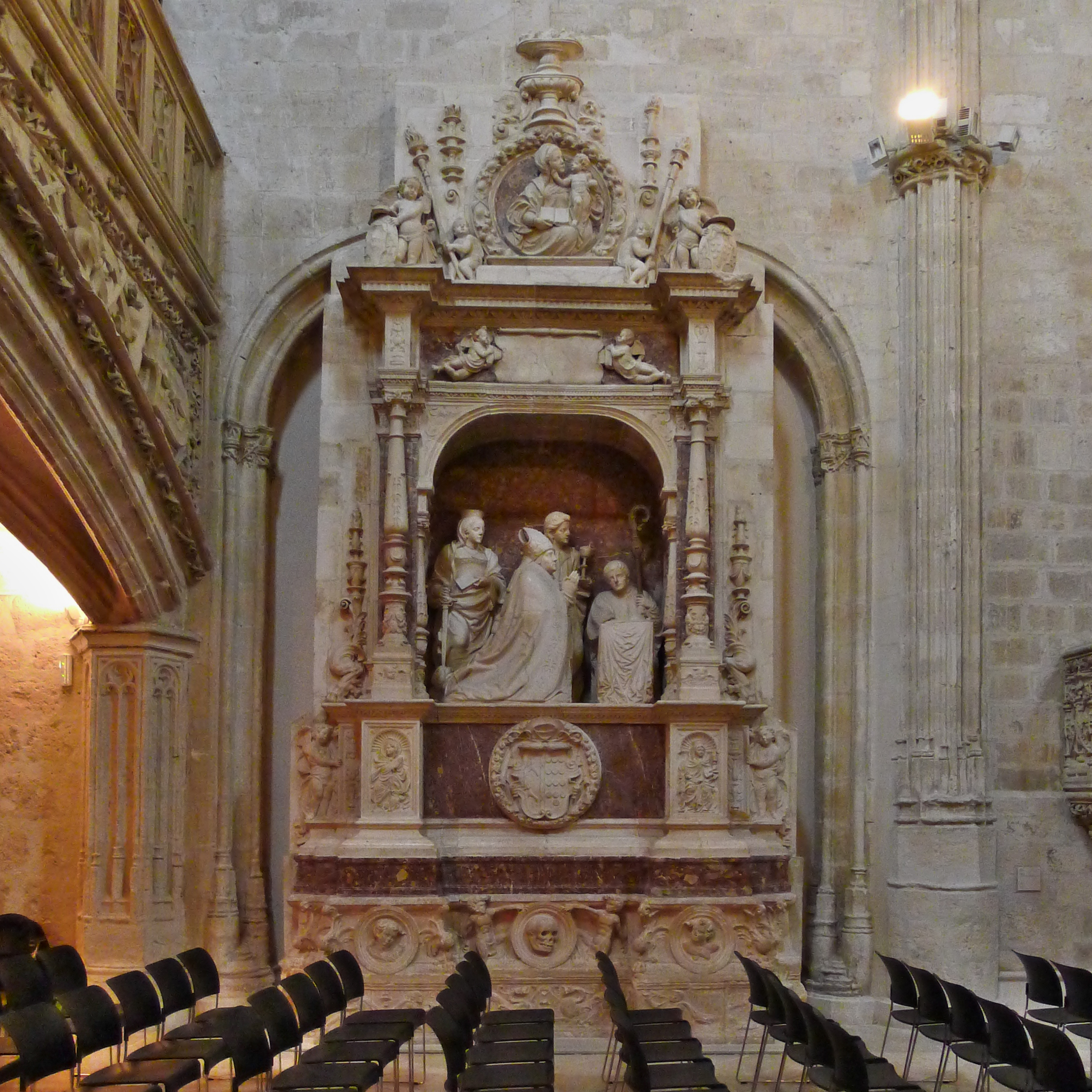
Sepulchre of Diego de Avellaneda

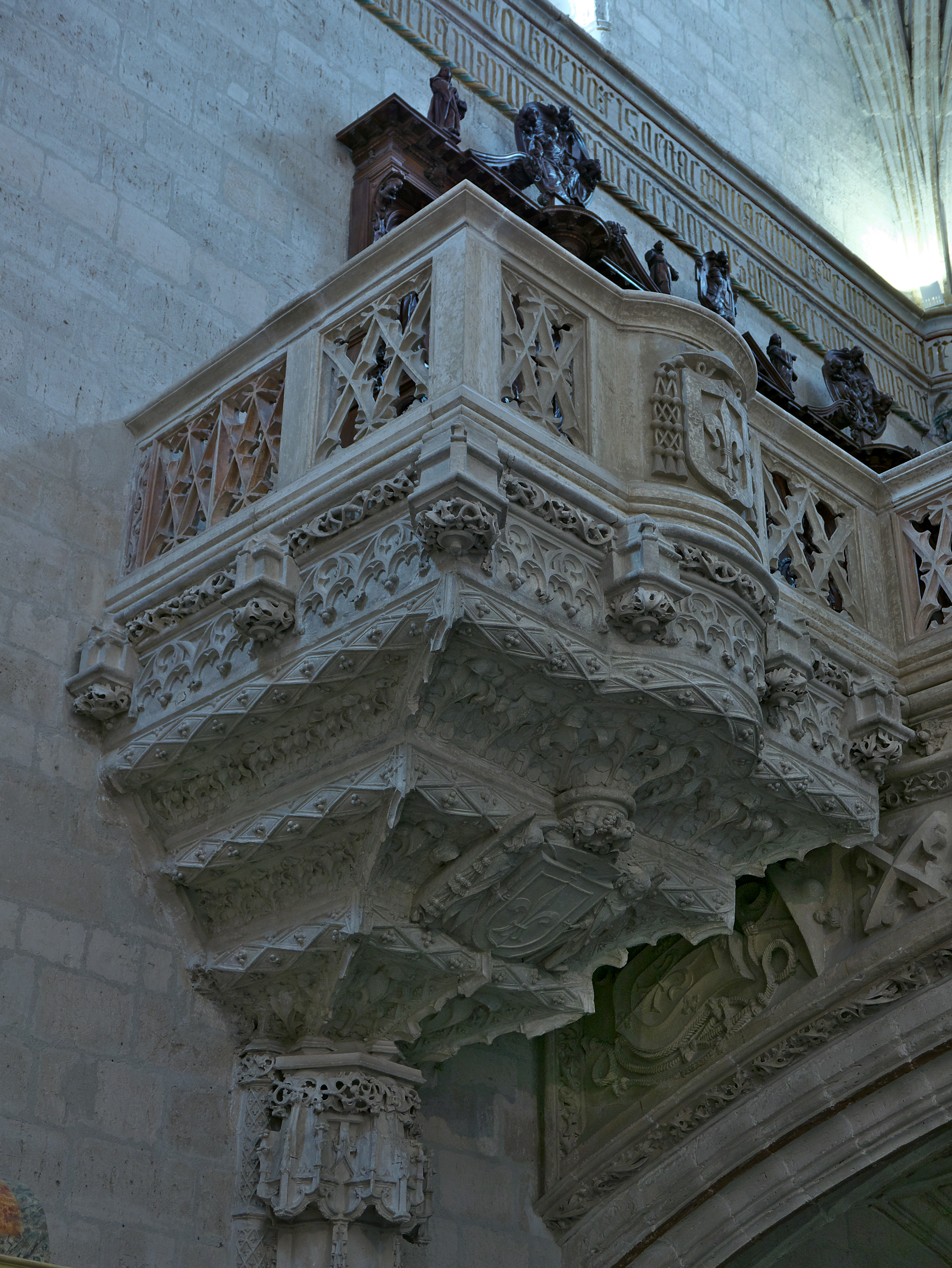
Tribune

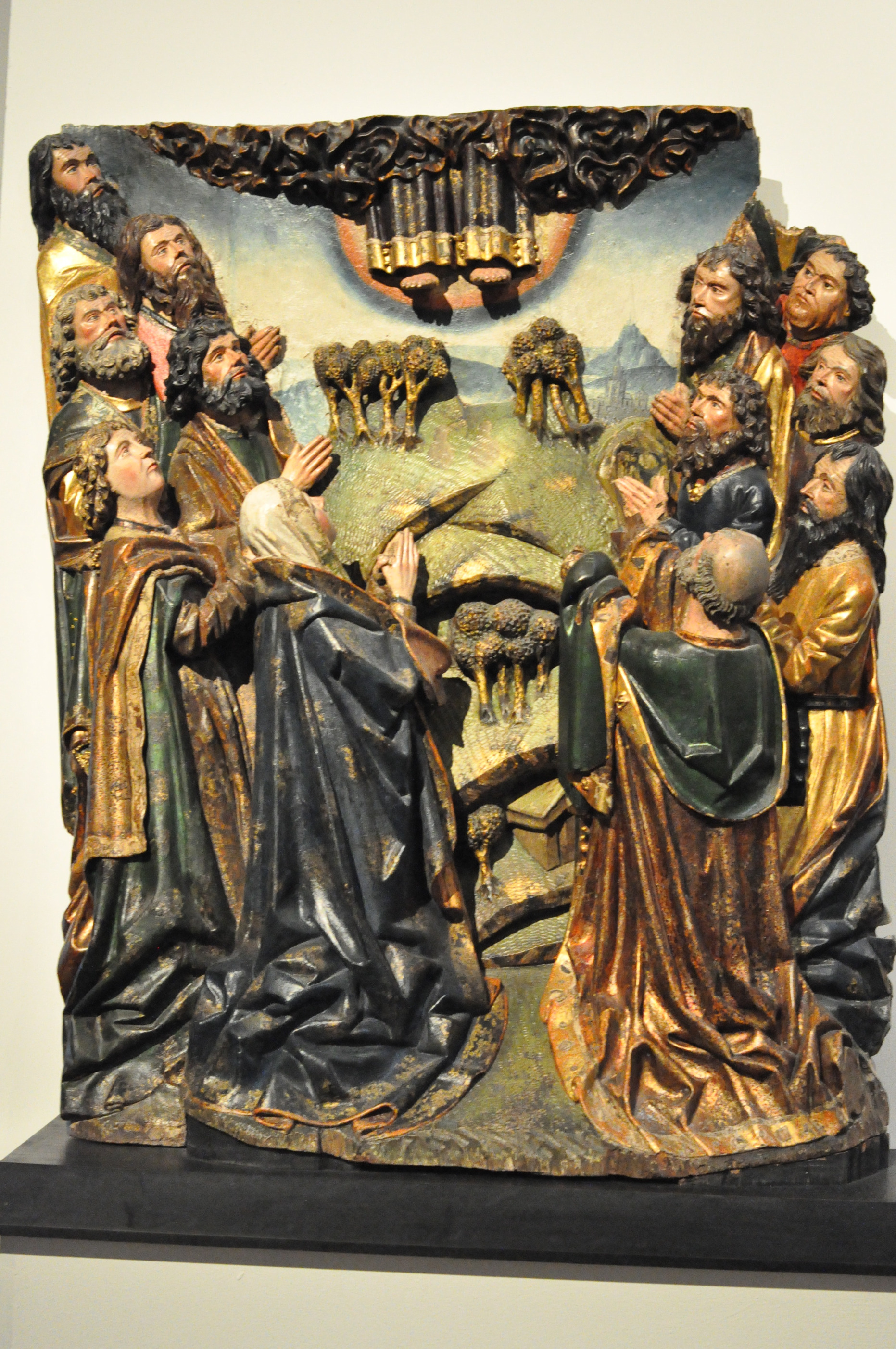
Relief of the Ascension from the former altarpiece by Gil de Siloé

=== Patio Grande ===
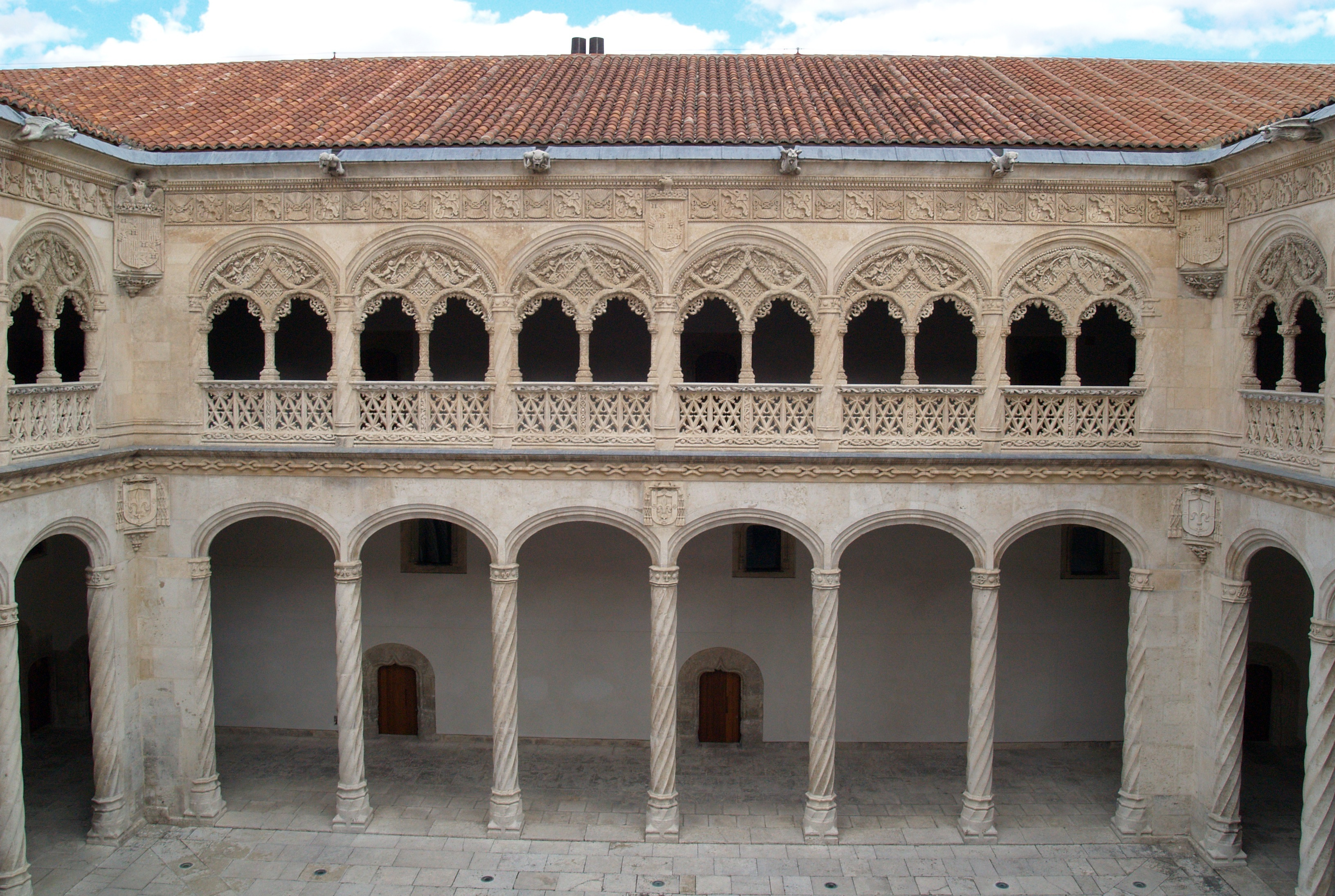
Patio Grande

The Patio Grande (Great Courtyard) is the centre of the complex. It has been attributed to Juan Guas for its similarities with the Palacio del Infantado, Guadalajara, although it also incorporates motifs that Bartolomé Solórzano, an active artist at that time in the area, used in the Cathedral of Palencia, of which Friar Alonso's was bishop. It has abundant emblems of the Catholic Monarchs and the kingdoms of Navarre and Granada, incorporated into the Crown of Castile during the erection of the building.

It is square and is surrounded by two floors of covered arcades. The lower has depressed arches supported by slender Solomonic columns with spiral fluting, perhaps a reference to the Temple of Solomon, alluding to the college being a "temple of wisdom". The columns have capitals of balls and fleur-de-lis. The upper gallery has very elaborate Isabelline decoration, with Gothic traceried openwork balustrades and round arches filled with very rich carving. As well as the foliage and fleur-de-lis motifs of earlier work, the carving includes putti and other Renaissance forms, showing the transition to the Plateresque style. The composition is topped with a frieze interspersing Renaissance egg-and-dart and dentil mouldings with imaginative Gothic gargoyles.

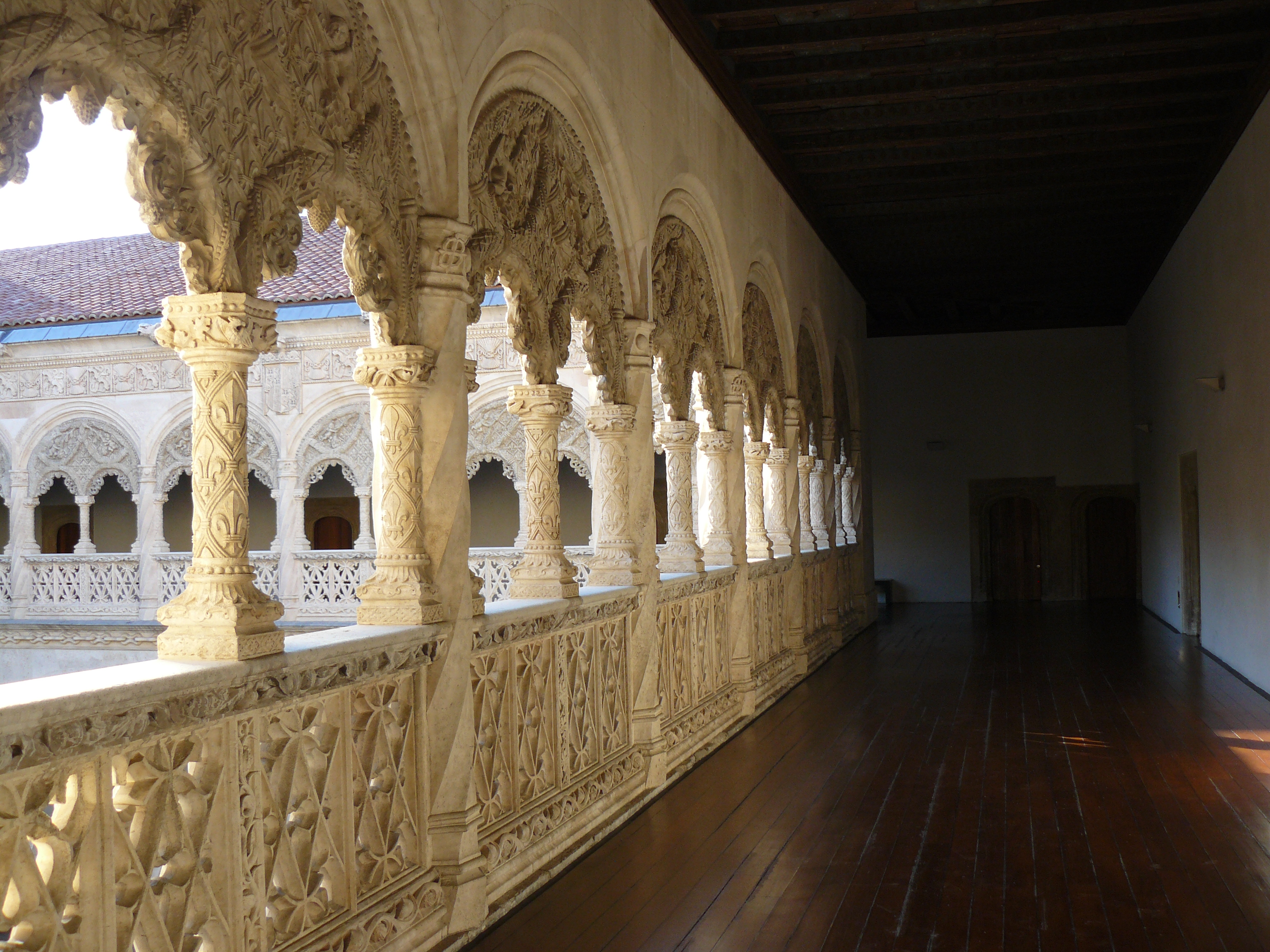
Upper gallery interior

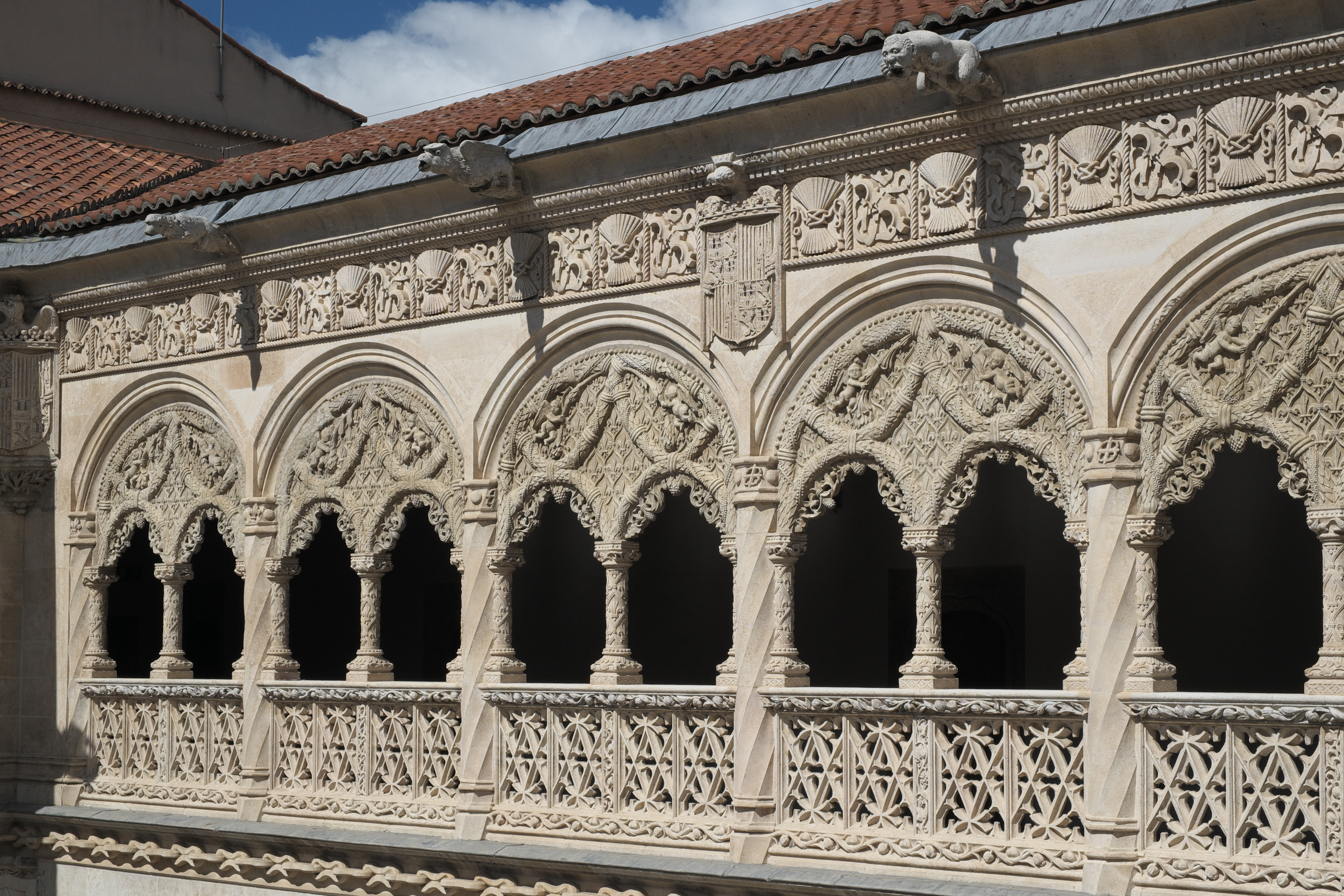
Upper gallery exterior

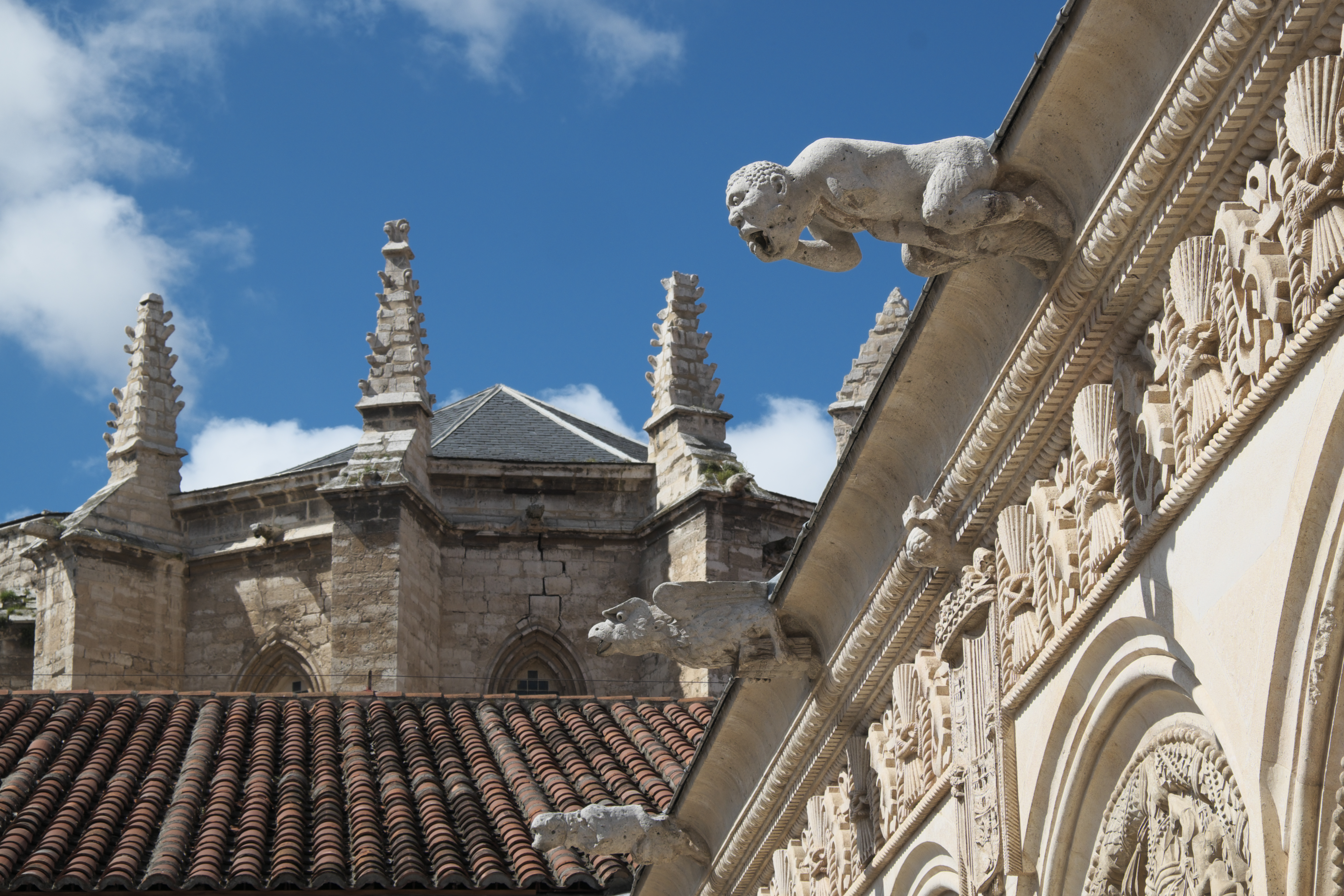
Frieze and gargoyles

=== Monumental staircase ===
The main staircase has two tiers: an Isabelline base and a Renaissance-influenced upper section decorated with the founder's heraldry. It also has an impressive Mudéjar roof on a frieze with the Catholic Monarchs' initials, and neo-Gothic parapets, added in the 1860s to replace a previous timber version.

=== Library ===
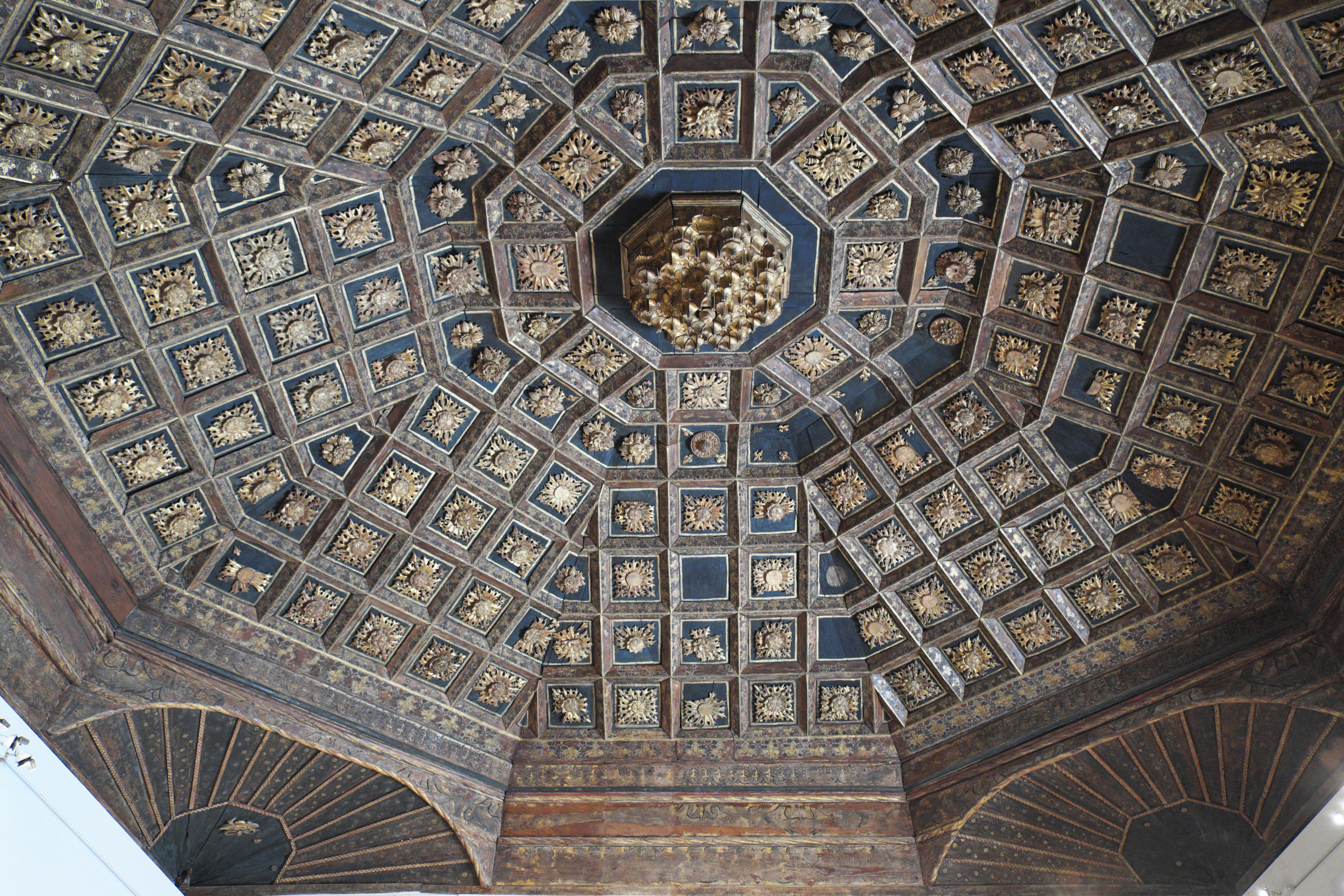
Coffered ceiling of the former library

On the ground floor of the south-east wing, behind the street frontage, were the kitchen and the refectory. The library, of which there are some remains including the coffered ceiling, was above.

=== Chapter house ===
The chapter house was on the upper floor of the north-west wing, which today houses the 'Hall 20' of the museum. Several Isabelline and Mudéjar elements from the chapter house survive.

== See also ==
- National Museum of Sculpture, Valladolid
- Isabelline style

== Bibliography ==
- Agapito y Revilla, J., The Church of the Convent of San Pablo and the Colegio de San Gregorio, Valladolid, 1911.
- Nieto, F. and Sobejano, E., "The Museo Nacional Colegio de San Gregorio (Valladolid)”. Museos.es: Journal of the General Sub-Office of State Museums, nº 4, 2008, pp. 56–63.
- Pereda Espeso, F., "Dwelling of the wild men: The jungle facade of the Colegio de San Gregorio and its contexts". In ALONSO RUIZ, B. (Coord.) The last architects of the Gothic, 2010, pp. 149–218.
- Rosende Vadés, A. A., "The issue of "wild men" in the Mondoñedo and Xunqueira de Ambia's stalls". Bulletin of the Seminar of Studies of Art and Archaeology, BSAA, vol 53, 1986, pp. 283–296.
- Ruiz Souza, J., "Castile and the freedom of the arts in 15th-century. The acceptance of the heritage of Al-Andalus: from material reality to the theoretical foundations". Anales de Historia del Arte, 2012, vol. 22, special number, pp. 123–161.
- Olivares Martínez, Diana. El Colegio de San Gregorio de Valladolid. Madrid: CSIC, 2020.
