= Juan de Talavera =

Juan de Talavera (Talavera de la Reina, ? 1476 -? 1531) (John of Talavera) was a Spanish architect, sculptor and carver, member of the "Toledo School of Architecture", and architect of Queen Isabella I of Castile. Probably his father was also named Juan de Talavera, and he was a nephew of Andrés de Talavera, both working in the Cathedral of Seville circa 1450. Juan de Talavera married Maria Gutierrez, daughter of Egas Coeman or Egas of Brussels and he was probably also a nephew of Juan Guas by his wife.

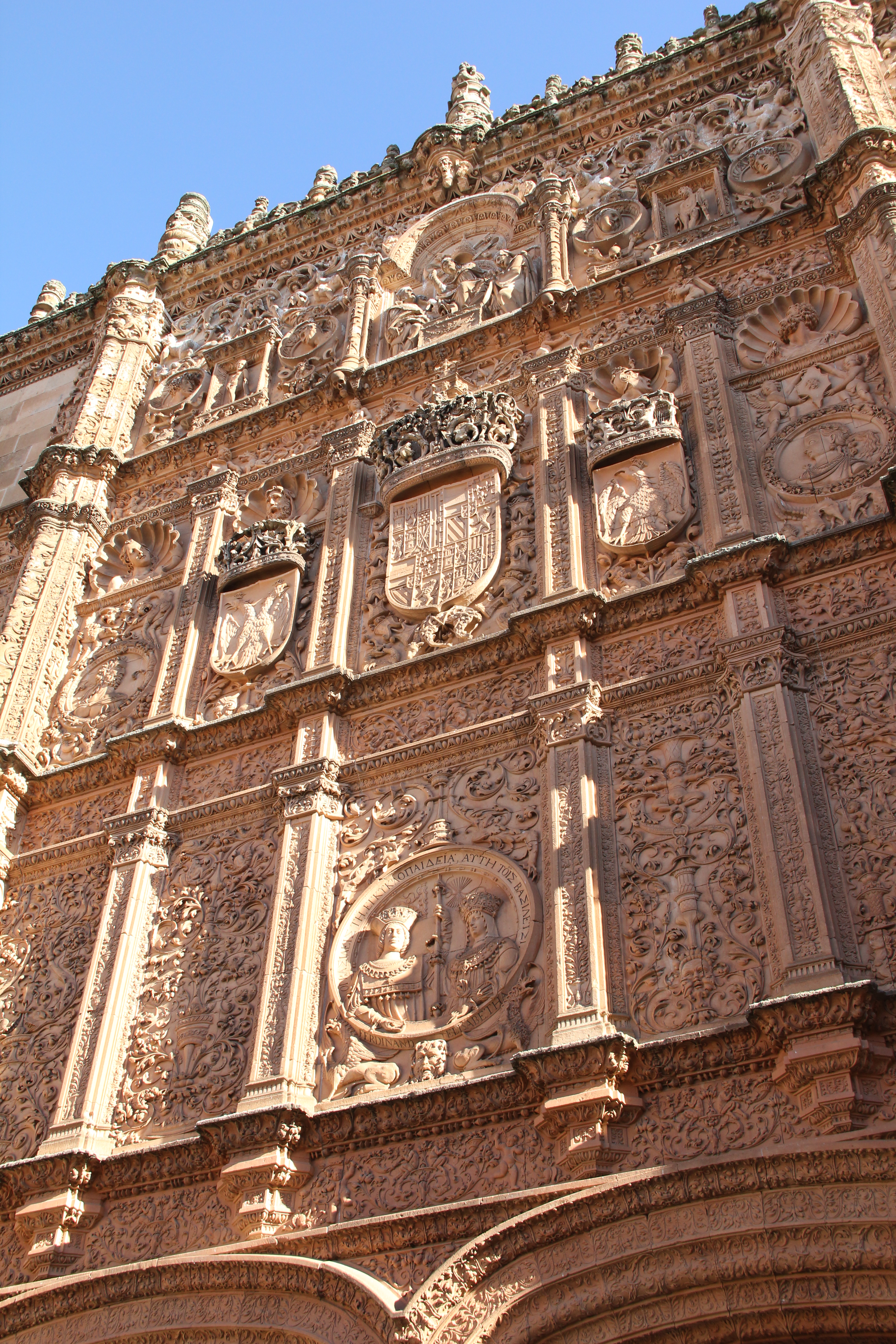
Facade of the University of Salamanca, masterpiece of Juan de Talavera

Juan de Talavera was disciple to some architects and sculptors who came from overseas to bring Spain new architectural models and artistic fashions from the rest of Europe, such as the French Juan Guas and the Flemish Egas of Brussels. Juan de Talavera belonged to the "Toledo School of Architecture".

His most valuable work is the facade of the University of Salamanca, also called the Puerta Rica (Rich Door) or Royal Facade, probably made with other partners on behalf of the Queen Joanna of Castile called "the Mad". Professor Alicia M. Canto has conducted a study on the matter.

== Main masterpieces ==
- Facade of the University of Salamanca, Rich Door
- Various works in the Cathedral of Segovia
- Santa Maria de la Mejorada, Olmedo, Valladolid
- Carvings in the Cathedral of Sigüenza
- Carvings in the Cathedral of Toledo
- Collegiate Daroca, Zaragoza
- Colegio de San Gregorio, Valladolid (chapel)
- Collegiate Church of Calatayud, Zaragoza
