= Iglesia de San Pablo, Valladolid =

Church building in Valladolid, Spain

St. Paul's Convent church
- Iglesia conventual de San Pablo
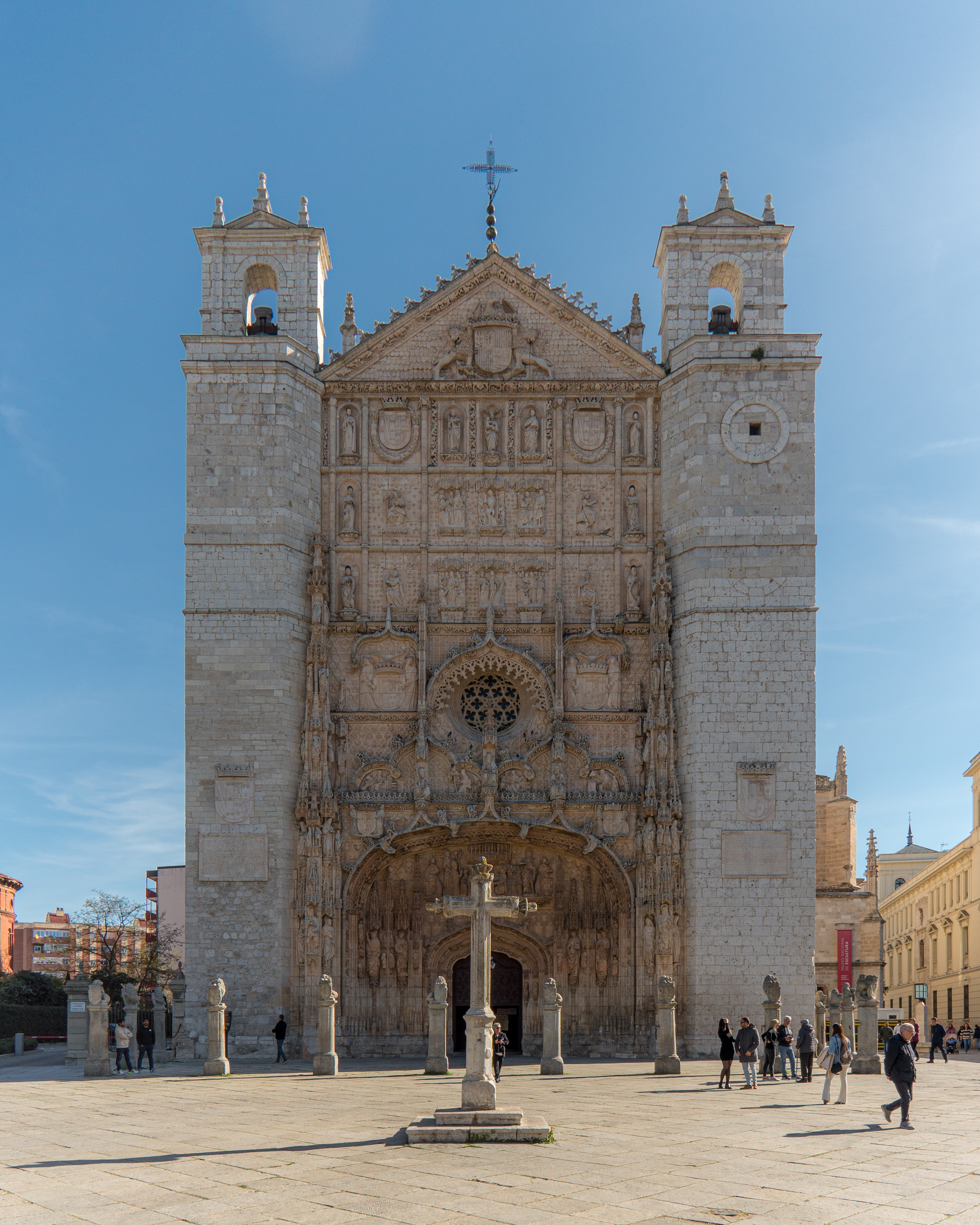
- Façade of the church

Religion
- Affiliation: Catholic
- Diocese: Valladolid
- Status: Active

Location
- Location: Valladolid, Province of Valladolid, Castile and León, Spain
- Interactive map of St. Paul's Convent church
- Coordinates: 41.6570°N 4.7245°W

Architecture
- Style: Isabelline Gothic (Gothic), Plateresque (Renaissance)
- Completed: 1445-1616
- Direction of façade: Southwest
- Spanish Cultural Heritage
- Official name: Iglesia conventual de San Pablo
- Type: Monument
- Designated: 03-06-1931
- Reference no.: RI-51-0000983

Website
- Official Web

The Iglesia conventual de San Pablo or San Pablo de Valladolid is a church and former Dominican convent, of Isabelline style, in the city of Valladolid, in Castile and León, Spain. The church was commissioned by Cardinal Juan de Torquemada between 1445 and 1468. It was subsequently extended and refurbished until 1616. Kings Philip II and Philip IV of Spain were baptized in the church, and it was visited by Napoleon. It is one of the buildings considered most emblematic of the city.

== History ==
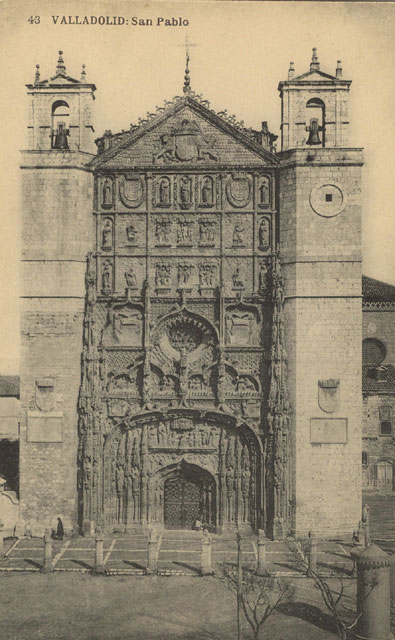
Old Postcard of the church.

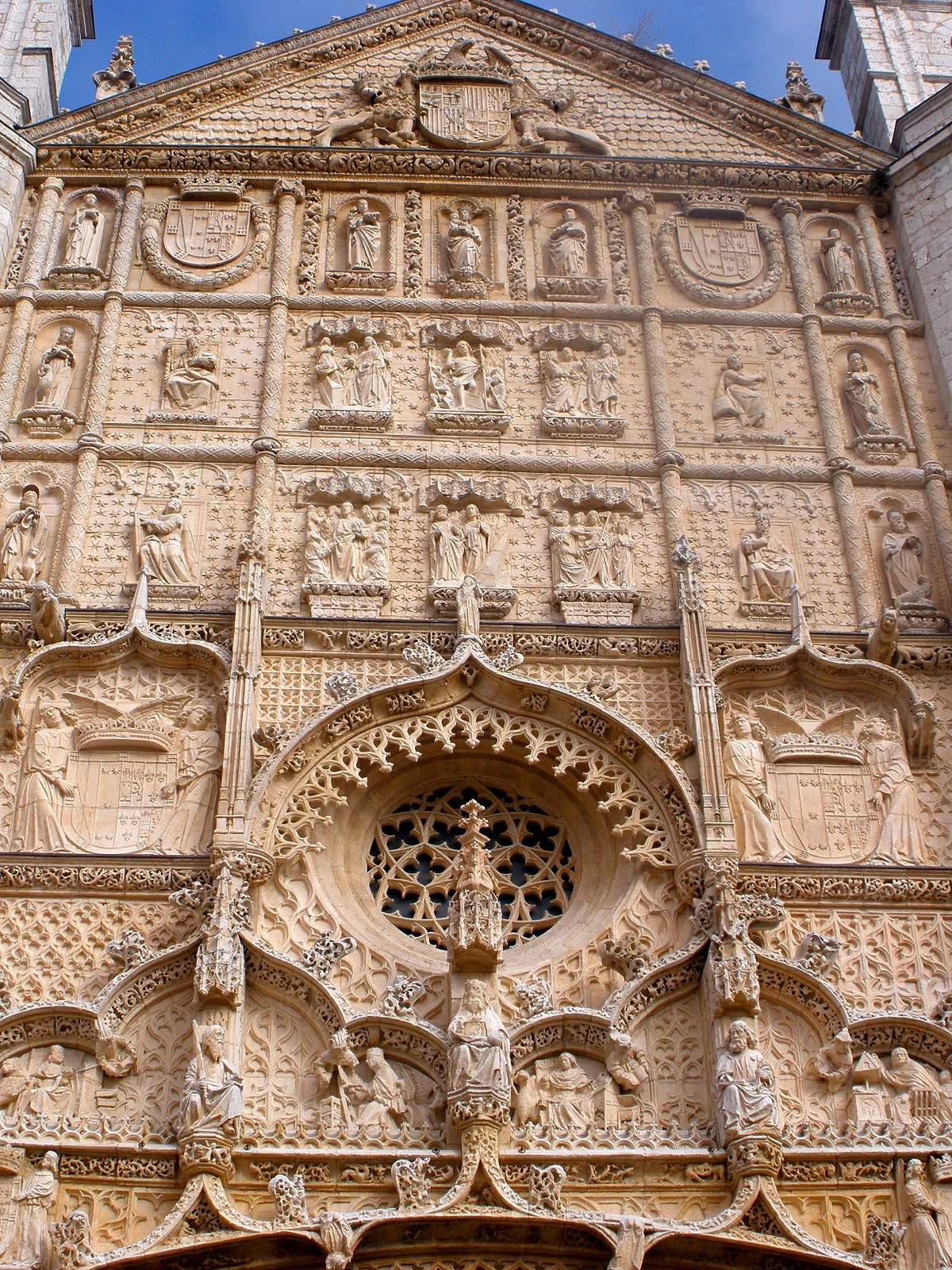
Detail of Upper Facade.

The church construction was commissioned by Cardinal Torquemada to replace a previous church, which had a timber ceiling and was adjacent to a Dominican convent that had been founded in 1270. After Torquemada's death, bishop Alonso de Burgos funded the building of the cloister, refectory, and lower façade, as well as of the adjacent Colegio de San Gregorio with its funerary chapel. Artists who worked to the church in this period include the Spanish-Flemish Juan Guas and Simón de Colonia. Around 1550, Cardinal Juan Garcia Loaysa, confessor of the emperor Charles V, built the sacristy, covered with a dome decorated by stars, coat of arms of the order and figures of Dominican saints. The nave features rib vaults, supported by corbels in Renaissance style, added around 1540.

After the capital of the Kingdom of Spain was moved from Valladolid to Madrid, the church came under the patronage of the Duke of Lerma, who had its façade renovated and added numerous artworks in the interior. In 1613–1616 Juan de Nates, following a design by Francisco de Mora, executed the patronal tribune, and the Doric gate of the sacristy.

== Description ==
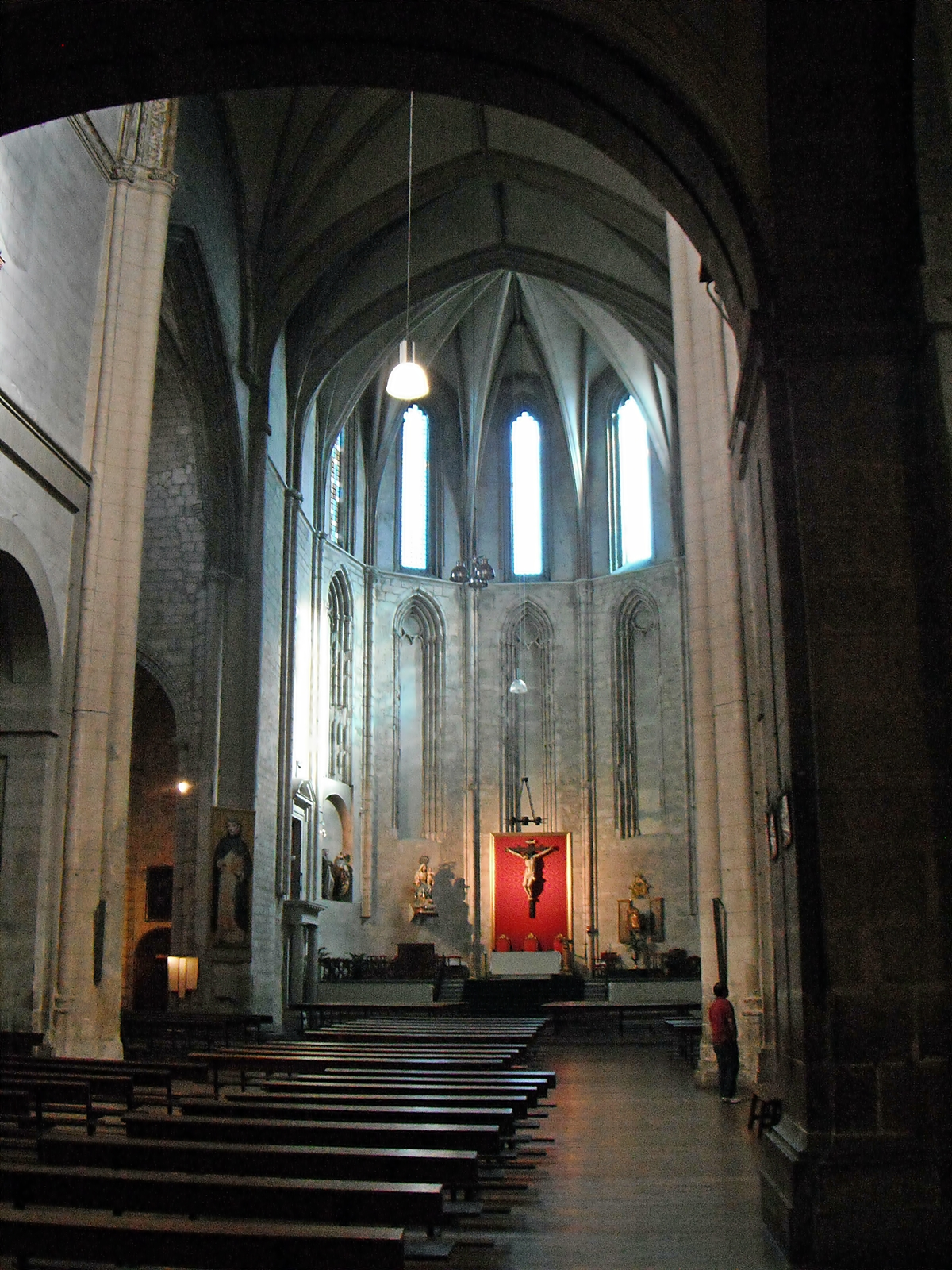
Apse, altar, choir and nave.

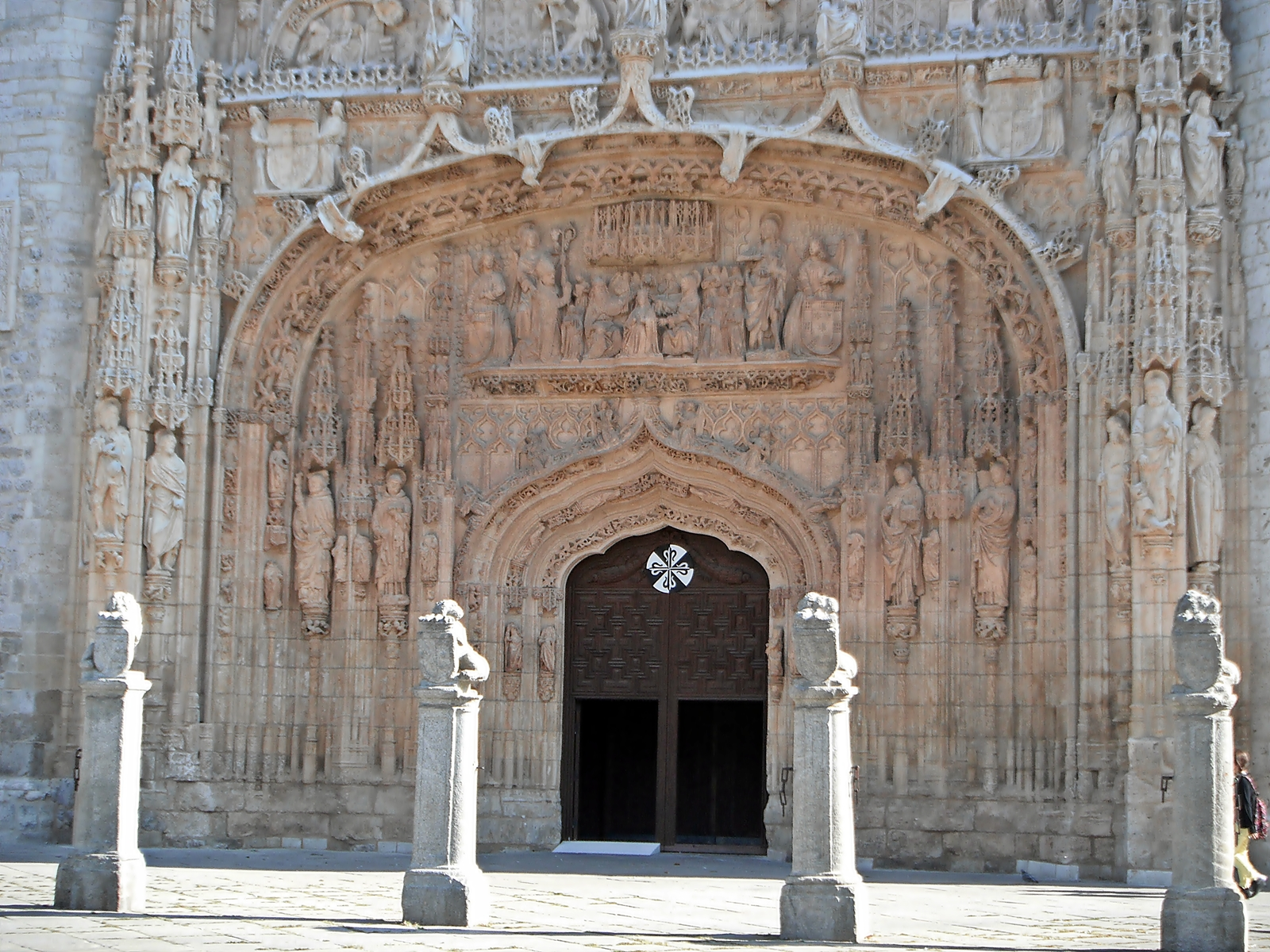
Lower facade and Entrance portal.

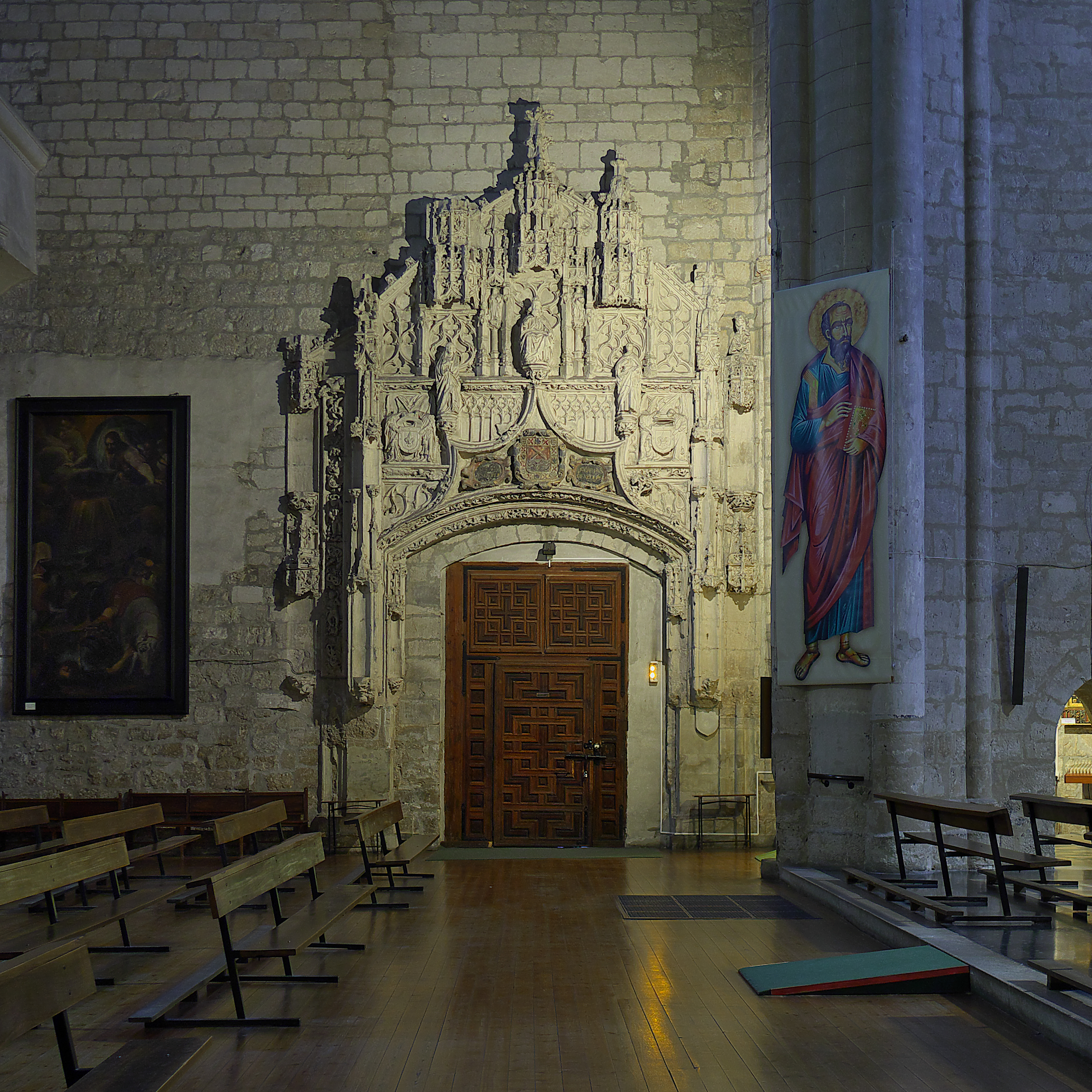
Portada del Evangelio inside church.

Typically for the late Gothic style dominant at the time, the church has a single nave, with side chapels opening between buttresses, with a raised choir and transept. At the ends of the transept are two stone portals from the workshop of Simón de Colonia, dating to c. 1490. The left one gives access to the Chapel of the Crucifix, while the right one led to the funerary chapel of Alonso de Burgos.

The façade, designed by Simón de Colonia, was completed in 1500. Two phases can be distinguished in it: the first one, including the section up to the top of the central rose window, features gargoyles and sided by two spires. The entrance portal is surrounded by a large arch with a wavy profile, in which is a relief with the Coronation of the Virgin in the presence of bishop Alonso de Burgos. The upper part of the façade features rectangular spaces up the summit tympanum. For its decoration were used some Gothic elements taken from other buildings and new ones, in the course of the renovation program funded by the Duke of Lerma, which also included the construction of the two side towers. The stars in the background refer to the coat of arms of the Sandoval y Rojas family, of which the Duke was a member; he is buried inside the church.

The interior has two absidal chapels, housing an image of St Dominic of Guzmán, by Gregorio Fernández, and a Christ by the same artist, who also executed works in the presbytery.

In the transept are two paintings by Bartolomé de Cárdenas: Calling of St Peter and the Conversion of St Paul

== Sources ==
- Vivar Cantero, Roberto (2006). Guía de Arquitectura Urbana de Valladolid. Ayuntamiento de Valladolid.
