= Alonso de Burgos =

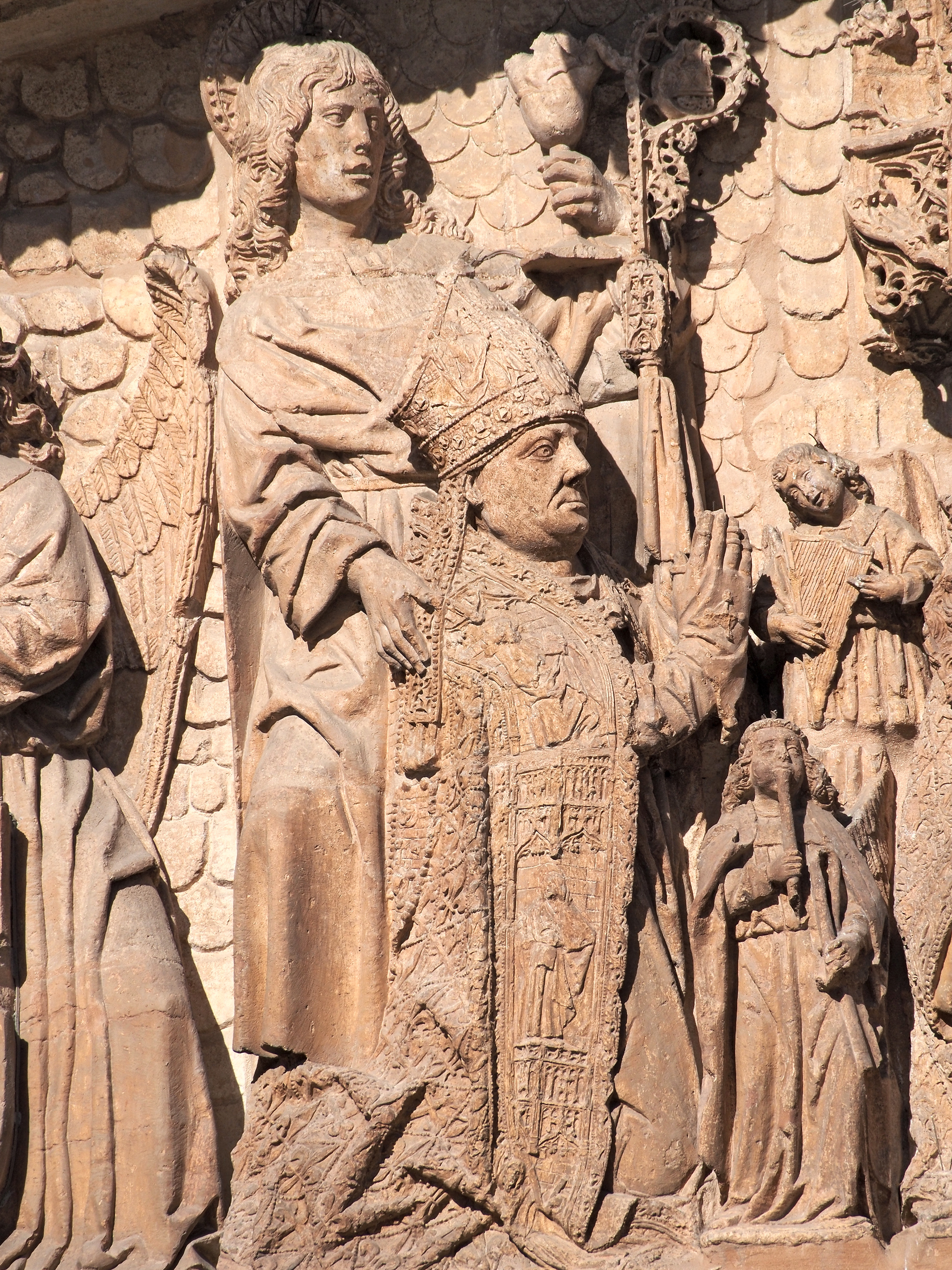
Bishop Alonso de Burgos as offerer on the tympanum of the portico of the church of San Pablo de Valladolid.

Alonso (or Alfonso) de Burgos (before 1477 – 1499) was the royal confessor of Ferdinand and Isabella.

== Biography ==
Alonso was born of a noble family in Burgos. He was conspicuous for learning before his entrance into the Dominican order, early in life.

His preaching attracted the notice of Ferdinand and Isabella, who selected him as royal confessor. On the recommendation of the latter, Alfonso was appointed to the see of Córdoba by Sixtus IV, 30 April 1477. Remaining there only four years, he was transferred to the Bishopric of Cuenca, and in 1484, or according to P. B. Gams in 1486, to Palencia.

At the same time he held successively the office of Grand Chaplain of the Court, Counsellor of the Catholic King, and President of the Council of Castile.

In the latter capacity he was instrumental in getting pecuniary grants from the crown for Columbus. During the years 1487 and 1488 he obtained eight thousand pounds at various times for the fitting out of a fleet. In the absence of the king he exercised his right as president of the council in giving orders for a payment of three thousand pounds to the discoverer.

These duties did not hinder him from repairing many dilapidated churches of his diocese. He built, out of his own revenues, the Dominican convent of St. Vincent Ferrer at Palencia, in 1486. He takes a high rank in the history of Spanish education for completing the Colegio de San Gregorio at Valladolid, begun by King Alfonso the Wise (1252–1284).

Alonso died at Valladolid in 1499.
