= Bartolomé de Cárdenas (painter died 1628) =

Spanish painter

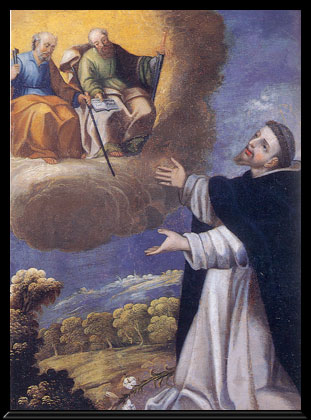
Apparition of the Apostles Petrus and Paulus before Santo Domingo. Valladolid, Convent of Corpus Christi de Madres Dominicas. Circle of Cárdenas, ca. 1620.

Bartolomé de Cárdenas (c. 1575–1628) was a Portuguese painter who worked in Spain.

== Life ==
According to Antonio Palomino, Cardenas was a native of Portugal, who, while still very young, went to Madrid, where he became the pupil of Alonso Sanchez Coello, and achieved a deservedly high reputation. He painted most of the cloisters of the convent of Nuestra Senora de Atocha, at Madrid. In the later part of his life he went to Valladolid, where he painted many altar-pieces, and decorated the cloisters of the convent of San Pablo. He died at Valladolid in 1606.
