= Trumeau (architecture) =

Central pillar within a large doorway

A trumeau is the central pillar or mullion supporting the tympanum of a large doorway, commonly found in medieval buildings. An architectural feature, it is often sculpted. Monolithic or paired, it becomes sculpted or decorated in Romanesque architecture, whose architectural invention consisted in animating the structure of the door, at the same time as Romanesque artists imagined compound pillars and double scrolled arcades, in the second quarter of the 11th century.

== Gallery ==
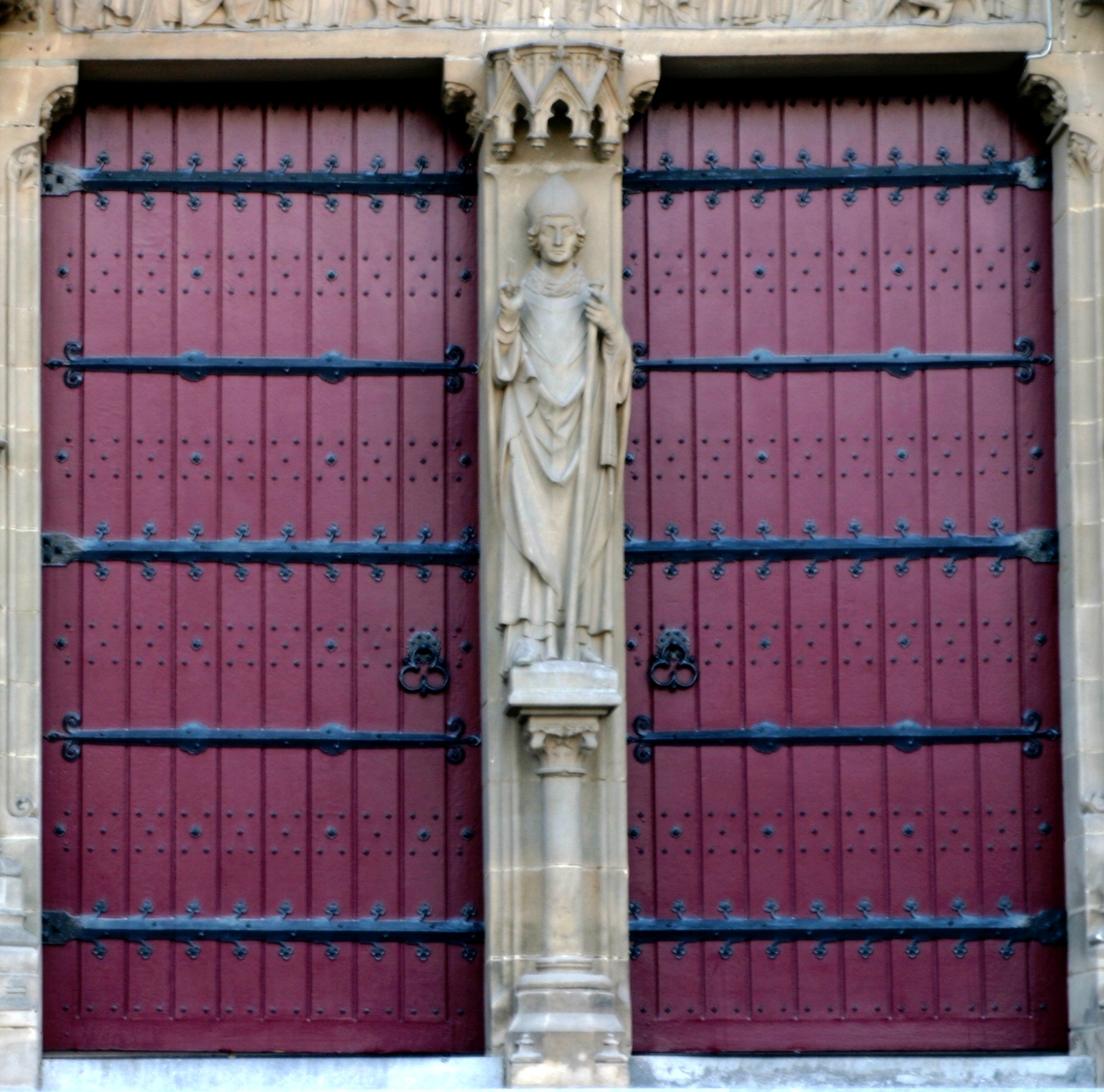
Trumeau of the main portal of Saint Martin's Church, Arlon

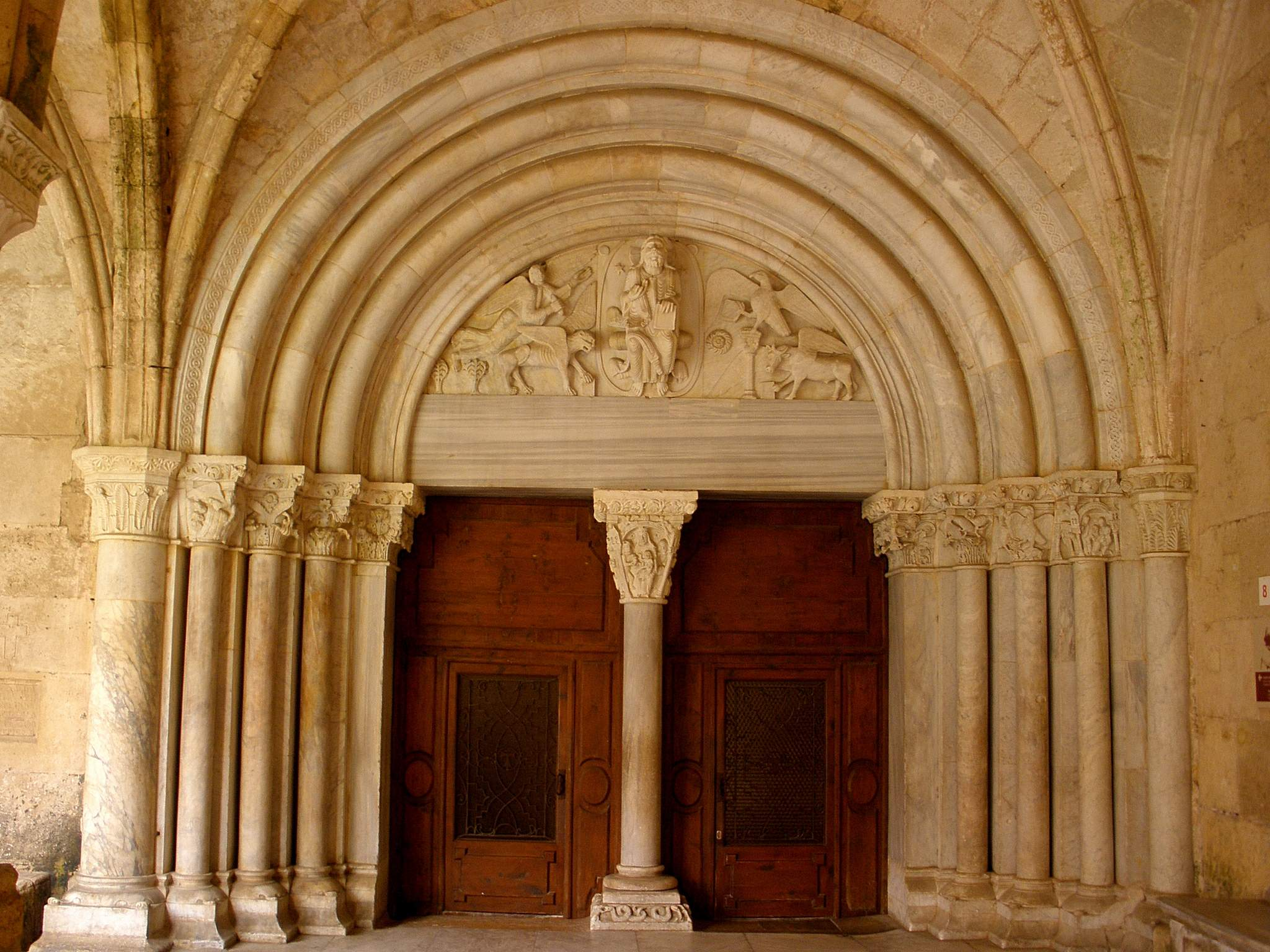
Romanesque trumeau at the Tarragona Cathedral

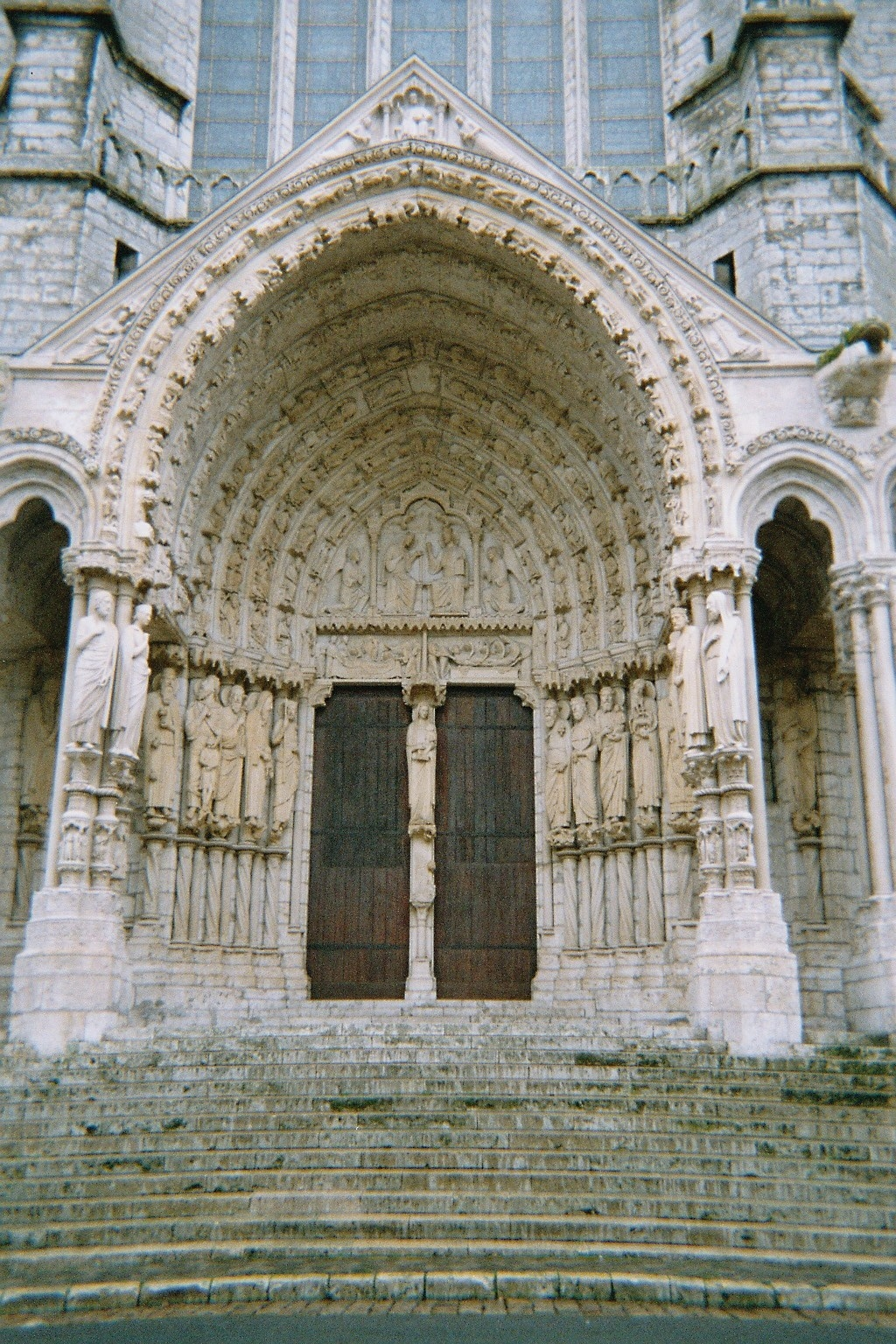
Central porch, north facade, Chartres Cathedral

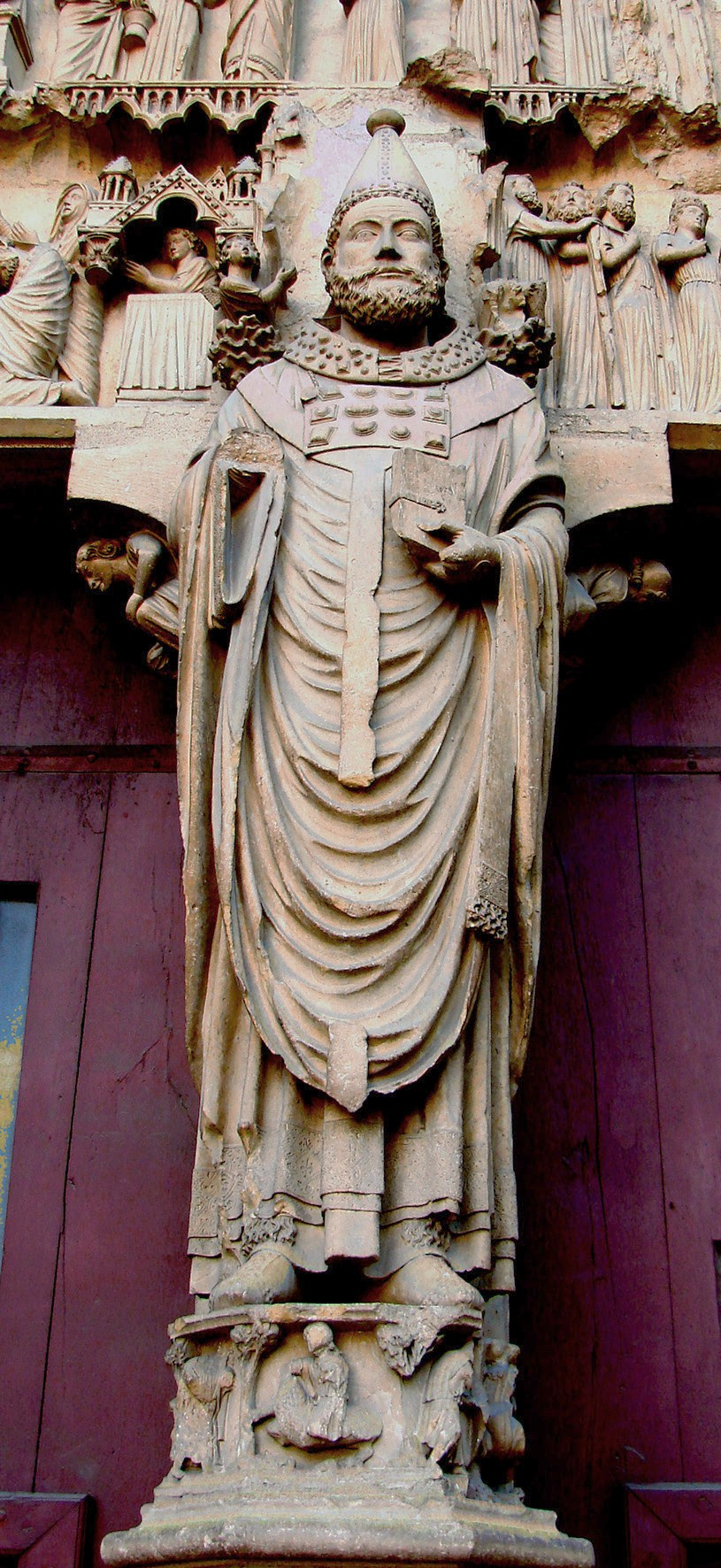
Gothic trumeau at the Reims Cathedral

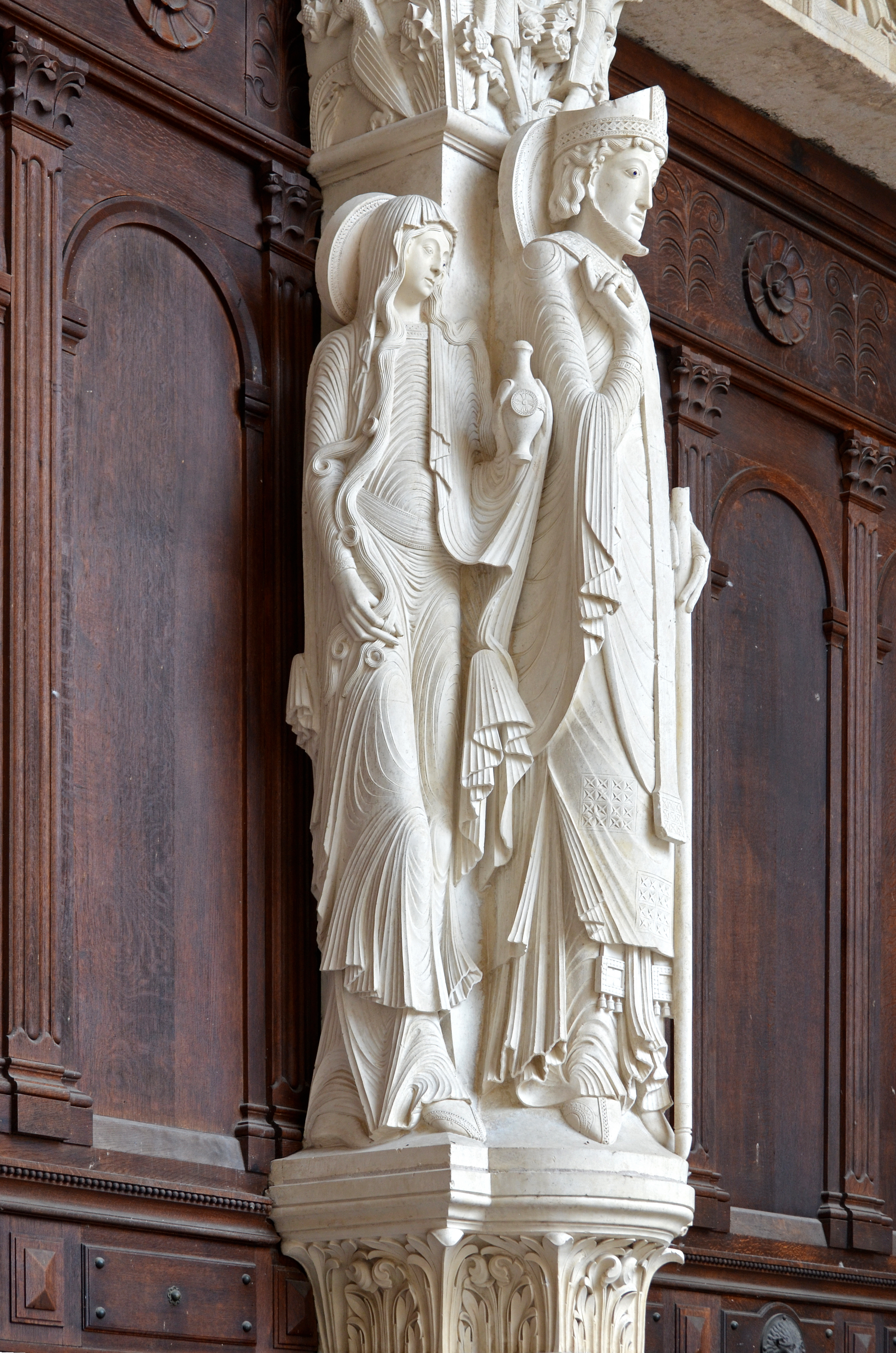
Trumeau of the main portal of Saint-Lazare Cathedral

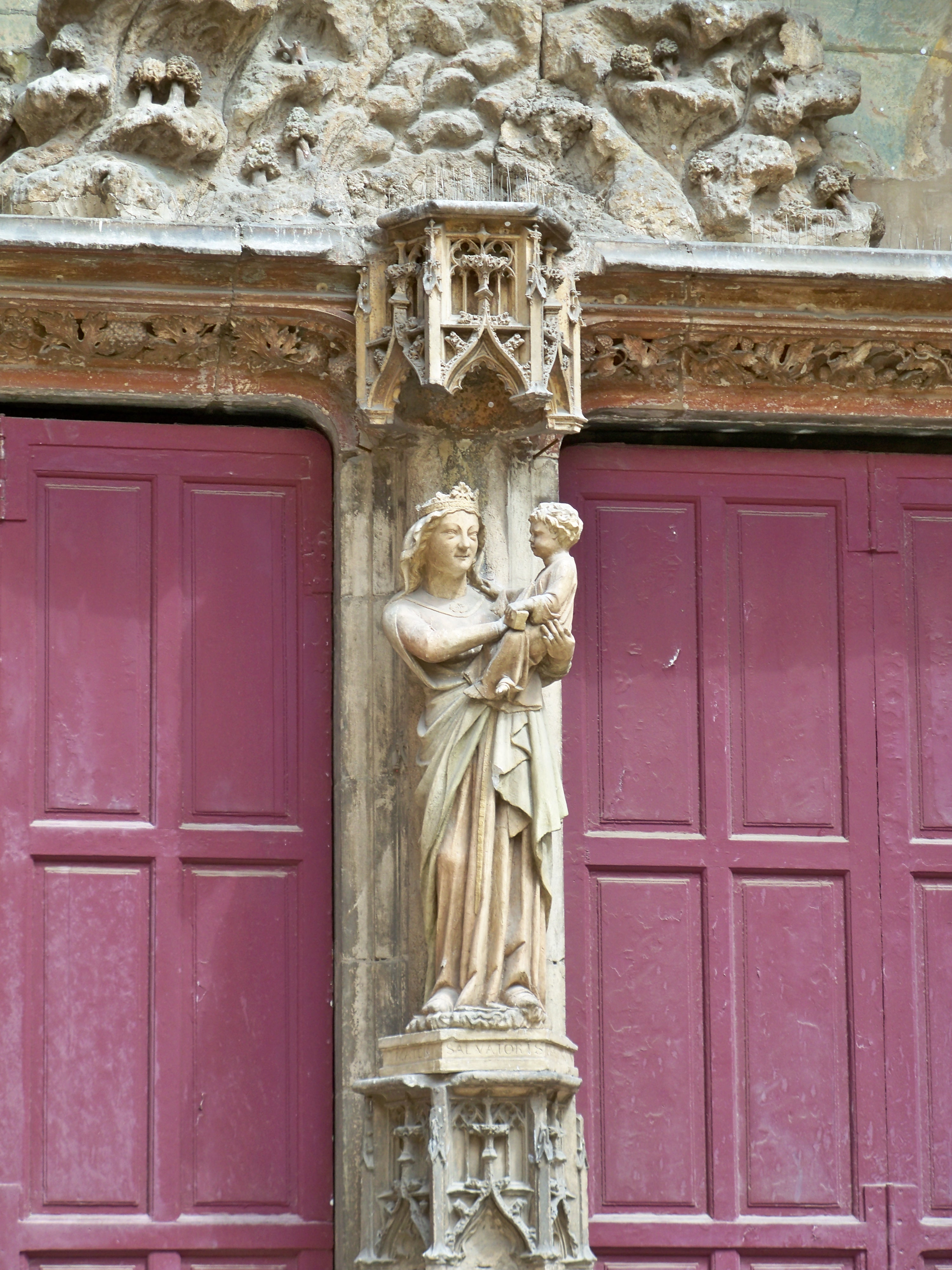
Trumeau of the main portal of Aix Cathedral

== See also ==
- Jamb statue
