= Jamb statue =

Carving around doorways or windows

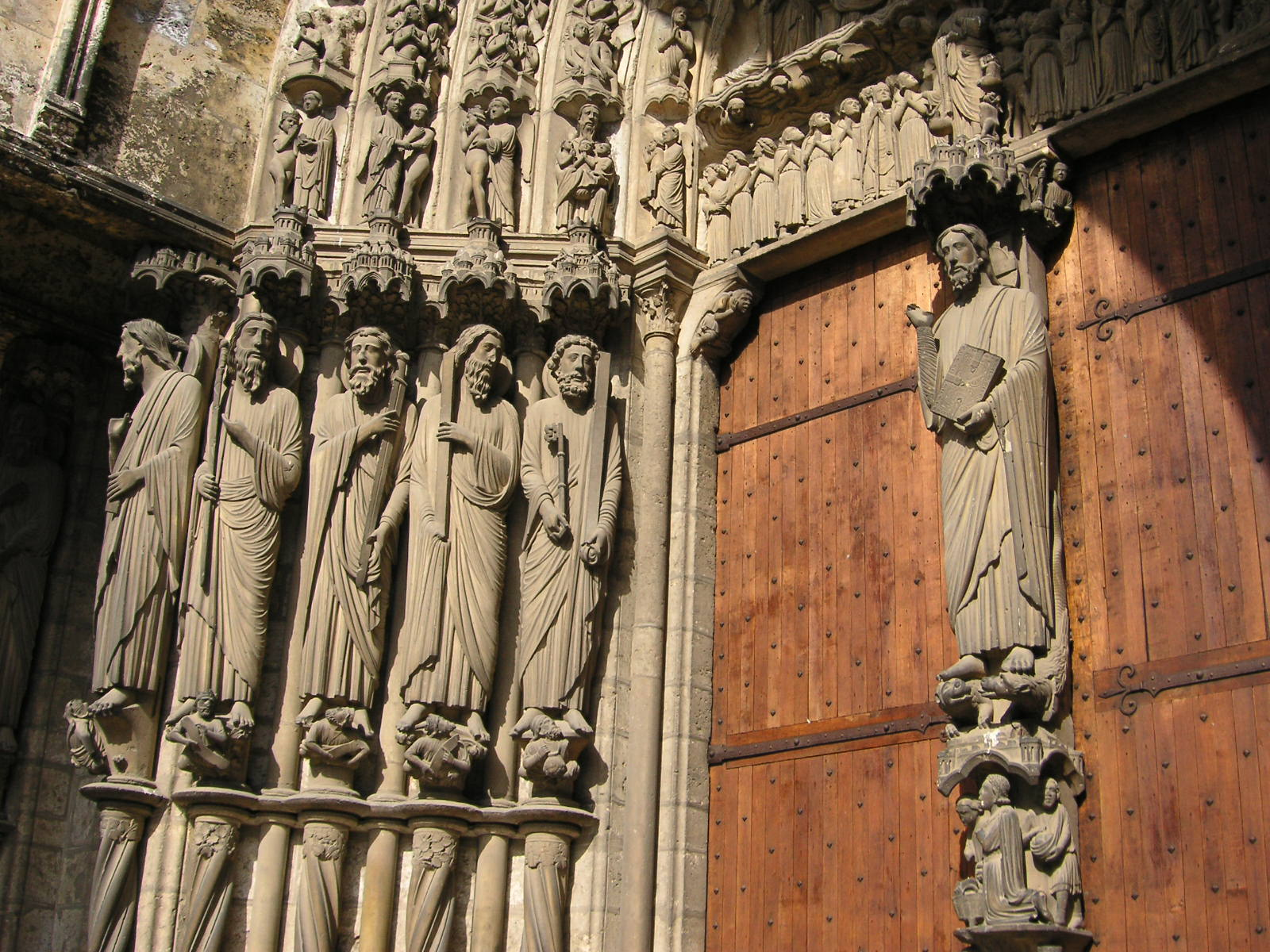
Jamb statues at Chartres Cathedral

A jamb statue is a figure carved on the jambs of a doorway or window. These statues are often human figures – typically religious figures or secular or ecclesiastical leaders. Jambs are usually a part of a portal, accompanied by lintel and trumeau.

Two well known examples of jamb statues are the ones in Chartres Cathedral and those in Reims Cathedral; both locations are in France.

Chartres Cathedral's jamb statues contribute to a royal portal. Jamb statues have also been known in the past to contribute to the representation of social strata on different levels.

A connection between jamb statues and pilgrimage sculpture has been explored in the past in connection to the lion sign often occurring within jamb sculptures.
