= Jamb =

Lining of a doorway or other opening in a wall

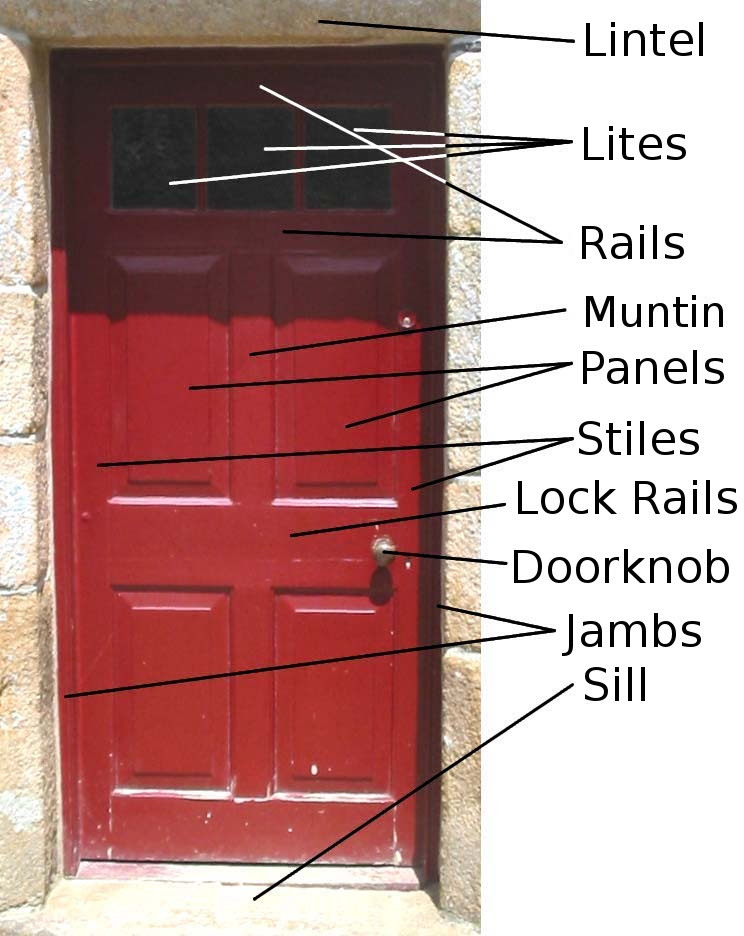
A diagram of a door, with the jambs labeled.

In architecture, a jamb (from French jambe 'leg'), is the side-post or lining of a doorway or other aperture. The jambs of a window outside the frame are called reveals. Small shafts to doors and windows with caps and bases are called jamb-shafts; when in the inside arris of the jamb of a window, they are sometimes called scoinsons.

A doorjamb, door jamb, or sometimes doorpost is the vertical portion of the door frame onto which a door is secured. The jamb bears the weight of the door through its hinges, and most types of door latches and deadbolts extend into a recess in the doorjamb when engaged, making the accuracy of the plumb (i.e. true vertical) and strength of the doorjambs vitally important to the overall operational durability and security of the door.

The word jamb is also used to describe a wing of a building, perhaps just in Scottish architecture. John Adam added a 'jamb' to the old Leith Customs house in the Citadel of Leith in 1754–1755.

In arches and vaults, the soffit is the curved inner surface of the arch or vault located above the impost, as opposed to the outer surface called the arch or vault crest.

== See also ==
- Jamb statue
- Post and lintel
