= Juan Guas =

Spanish artist and architect

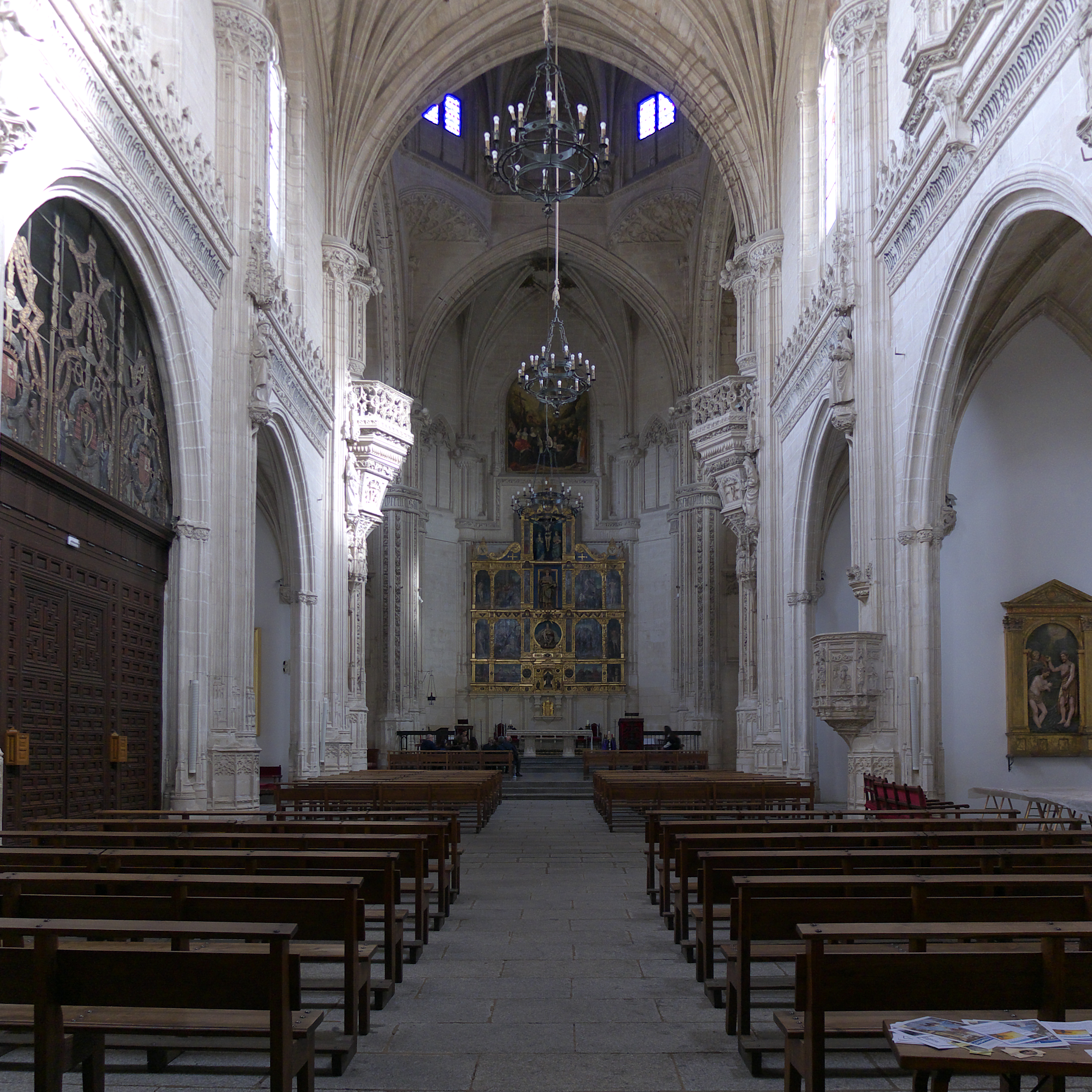
Monastery of Saint John of the Kings. Toledo

Juan Guas (c. 1430-33 – c. 1496) was a Spanish artist and architect of Breton origin. He worked in a group of architects to create the Isabelline style. Born in Saint-Pol-de-Léon, he moved to Spain when he was young, and is often thought to have been Spanish. Among his notable buildings are:

- Monasterio de San Juan de los Reyes, Toledo
- Palacio del Infantado, Guadalajara
- Segovia Cathedral - Guas worked on the original cathedral and his cloister and part of his facade were transferred to the new site and rebuilt next to Hontañon's cathedral church a generation later.
- Castle of Belmonte.
- Colegio de San Gregorio
- Monastery of El Paular, Cloister.
