= Timeline of Valladolid =

The following is a timeline of the history of the city of Valladolid, Castile-Leon, Spain.

== Prior to 20th century ==
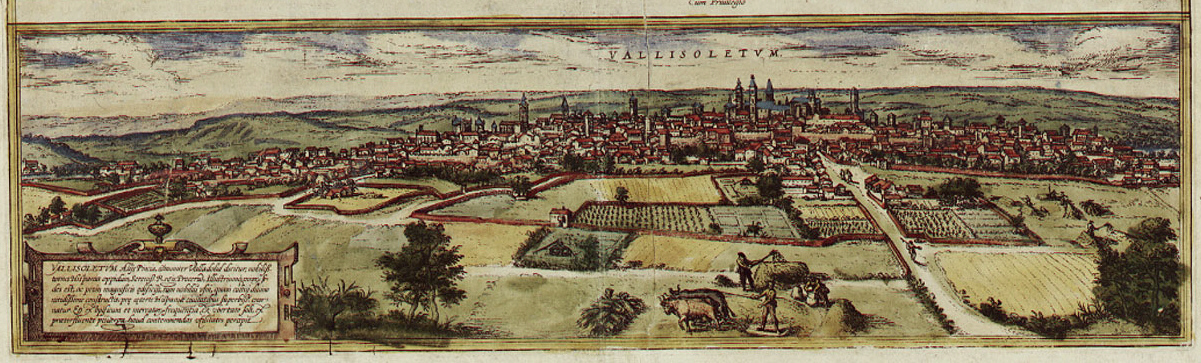
Valladolid, 16th century (illustration from Braun and Hogenberg's Civitates Orbis Terrarum)

- 920 CE – Ordoño II of León in power.
- 1074 – Castilian Pedro Ansúrez in power.
- 12th century CE – Santa María La Antigua church built.
- 1276 – San Pablo Church founded.
- 1346 – University of Valladolid founded.
- 1389 – Convento de San Benito founded.
- 1453 – Execution of Álvaro de Luna at Plaza del Ochavo.
- 1468 – San Pablo Church built.
- 1469 – 19 October: Wedding of monarchs Ferdinand and Isabella.
- 1481 – Printing press in use.
- 1492 – Colegio de Santa Cruz built.
- 1496 – Colegio de San Gregorio built.
- 1506 – 20 May: Explorer Christopher Columbus dies in the Casa de Colon.
- 1513 – 5 January: Entry into city of Ferdinand II of Aragon.
- 1515 – Iglesia del monasterio de San Benito el Real (church) built.
- 1518 – 7 February: Coronation of Charles V of Spain.
- 1527 – Philip II of Spain born in Palacio de Pimentel.
- 1528 – Valladolid Royal Palace built (approximate date).
- 1540 – Archivo General de Simancas established near city.
- 1552 – Convent of Las Descalzas Reales active.
- 1559 – 21 May: Religious auto-da-fé ritual begins.
- 1561
  - 21 September: Fire of Valladolid.
  - Capital of Castile relocated from Valladolid to Madrid.
- 1570 – La Magdalena church built.
- 1585 – Valladolid Cathedral construction begins.
- 1589 – English College founded.
- 1595
  - Population: 40,000
  - Catholic Diocese of Valladolid established.
  - Iglesia Penitencial de Nuestra Señora de la Vera Cruz (Valladolid) (church) built.
- 1601 – Court of Philip III relocated to Valladolid.
- 1603 – Writer Cervantes moves to town.
- 1604 – Santa Maria de las Angustias (Valladolid) church built.
- 1610 – Expulsion of the Moriscos.
- 1668 – Valladolid Cathedral consecrated.
- 1808 – City sacked by French forces.
  - Population: 21,000 (Census 1787)
- 1813 – 4 June: City taken by English forces.
- 1842 – Provincial Museum of Fine Arts founded.
- 1856 – El Norte de Castilla newspaper begins publication.
- 1857 – Population: 41,943.
- 1861 – Lope de Vega Theatre inaugurated.
- 1864 – Teatro Calderón (theatre) opens.
- 1895 – Ariza-Valladolid Valladolid-Ariza railway begins operating.
- 1900 – Population: 68,789.

== 20th century ==
- 1903
  - Sociedad Castellana de Excursiones (travel club) founded.
  - Statue of Pedro Ansúrez erected in Plaza Mayor.
- 1905 – Statue of Columbus erected in the Campo Grande.
- 1924 – Academia de Caballería (cavalry academy) built.
- 1928 – Real Valladolid football club formed.
- 1930 – Population: 91,089.
- 1953 – Renault Valladolid Factory begins operating.
- 1956 – Seminci film festival begins.
- 1960 – Population: 151,807.
- 1970 – Population: 236,341.
- 1975
  - Polideportivo Huerta del Rey (arena) opens.
  - José Delicado Baeza becomes archbishop.
- 1976 – CB Valladolid basketball team formed.
- 1979 – Tomás Rodríguez Bolaños becomes mayor.
- 1982
  - Sociedad para el Desarrollo Industrial de Castilla y Leon (economic development entity) headquartered in city.
  - Estadio Nuevo José Zorrilla (stadium) opens.
- 1983 – City becomes part of the autonomous community of Castile and León.
- 1985 – Pabellón Polideportivo Pisuerga (arena) opens.
- 1991 – Population: 345,891.
- 1995 – Francisco Javier León de la Riva becomes mayor.

== 21st century ==
- 2003 – Valladolid Science Museum and Casa de la India established.
- 2007
  - Madrid–Valladolid high-speed rail line begins operating.
  - Symphony Orchestra of Castile and Leon headquartered in city.
  - Centro Cultural Miguel Delibes built.

== See also ==
- Valladolid history
- History of Valladolid (in Spanish)
- List of mayors of Valladolid (in Spanish)
- Architecture of Valladolid (in Spanish)
- Timelines of other cities in the autonomous community of Castile and León: Burgos, Salamanca

== Bibliography ==
=== in English ===
Published in the 18th-19th century

- Thomas Nugent (1749), "Valladolid", The Grand Tour, vol. 4, London: S. Birt, hdl:2027/mdp.39015030762580
- Charles Knight, ed. (1867). "Valladolid". Geography. English Cyclopaedia. Vol. 4. London: Bradbury, Evans, & Co. hdl:2027/nyp.33433000064810.
- Richard Ford (1890), "Valladolid", Handbook for Travellers in Spain (7th ed.), London: J. Murray, hdl:2027/uva.x004203850

Published in the 20th century

- "Valladolid". Spain and Portugal (3rd ed.). Leipsic: Karl Baedeker. 1908. OCLC 1581249.
- Albert F. Calvert (1908). "Valladolid". Valladolid, Oviedo, Segovia, Zamora, Avil, & Zaragoza; an Historical & Descriptive Account. Spanish series. London: John Lane. hdl:2027/mdp.39015004743590.
- "Valladolid (city)" . Encyclopædia Britannica. Vol. 27 (11th ed.). 1910. pp. 861–862.
- Benjamin Vincent (1910), "Valladolid", Haydn's Dictionary of Dates (25th ed.), London: Ward, Lock & Co.
- Edward Hutton (1911). "Valladolid". Cities of Spain. London: Methuen. hdl:2027/mdp.39015004782085.
- Ramón Ruiz Amado [in Spanish] (1913). "Valladolid". Catholic Encyclopedia. New York.

=== in Spanish ===
- Andrés Lozano Parreño y Navarro (1756). "Valladolid". Compendio histórico chronologico geografico... de España (in Spanish). Antonio Pérez de Soto.
- Manual histórico de Valladolid [Historical Guide to Valladolid] (in Spanish). Valladolid: Impr. de D. Damaso Santaren. 1845.
- "Valladolid: historia", Diccionario geográfico-estadístico-histórico de España (in Spanish), vol. 15, Madrid, 1849, hdl:2027/mdp.39015039374148
- José Maria Quadrado (1885). Valladolid, Palencia y Zamora. España, sus monumentos y artes, su naturaleza e historia (in Spanish). Barcelona: D. Cortezo.
- Guia-Anuario de Valladolid y su provincia (in Spanish). Valladolid: Imprenta Castellana. 1922.
