= Juan Alfonso de Polanco =

Spanish Catholic priest (1517–1576)

The Reverend Juan Alfonso de Polanco SJ
- Born: 24 December 1517; Burgos, Spain
- Died: 20 December 1576 (aged 58); Rome, Italy
- Occupations: Priest, secretary, chronicler
- Years active: 1547–1576
- Known for: Among founders of Jesuits
- Notable work: Secretary to superiors general

Juan Alfonso de Polanco SJ (24 December 1517 in Burgos – 20 December 1576 in Rome) was a Spanish Jesuit priest. From 1547 to 1556, he was the secretary of Ignatius of Loyola and one of his closest advisers. Later, he was the secretary of the first two superiors general of the Society of Jesus after Loyola, Diego Laynez, and Francis Borgia. He also chronicled the early history of the Jesuits.

== Biography ==
=== Origins ===
Polanco was born into the Polanco noble family of Burgos which had its origins in Santillana del Mar, Cantabria. His father was Gregorio de Polanco, merchant and regidor of the city of Burgos and his mother doña María de Salinas. They had eleven children, of whom five daughters (Maria, Leonor, Catalina, Ana and Beatriz) and four sons (Gregorio, Luis, Gonzalo, Juan Alfonso) would reach adulthood. His paternal grandparents were Gonzalo López de Polanco and Leonor de Miranda and his maternal grandparents Juan Alonso de Salinas and Catalina Iñigues de la Mota. His paternal great grandparents were Gonzalo Lopez de Polanco and Constanza de Maluenda Rodriguez.

His grandfather merchant Don Gonzalo Lopez de Polanco was the cousin of Lic. Don Luis Gonzalez de Polanco, one of the four "Alcaldes de la Casa y Corte de Su Majestad" and later Counselor of the Catholic Monarchs, who signed the will of Isabella I of Castile, the Queen who financed Christopher Columbus. Some of his ancestors had also been scribes, public notaries and alcaldes for the King in Santillana del Mar. Their emblazoned manor houses can be found in Suances and Oruña de Piélagos. The remains of his parents and grandparents rest in the family chapel of San Nicolás de Bari, Burgos, built from the beginning of the fifteenth century and whose works were financed by don Gonzalo López Polanco. Other tombs of his Polanco ancestors are found in the cloister and the Capilla de Polanco of the Collegiate Church of Santillana del Mar.

Like other companions of Ignatius, Diego Laynez and Jérôme Nadal, Polanco probably was born in a family of converted origin of the urban bourgeoisie. Historians such as John O'Malley and Robert Maryks reinforce this hypothesis. Polanco's Jewish origins can be traced back to his paternal great-grandmother Dona Constanza de Maluenda Rodriguez. Dona Constanza was the granddaughter of Juan Garces de Maluenda and Maria de Cartagena, sister of the converted rabbi of Burgos Solomon Ha-Levi, who became bishop of that city under the name of Paul of Burgos.

=== Studies and entering Jesuits ===
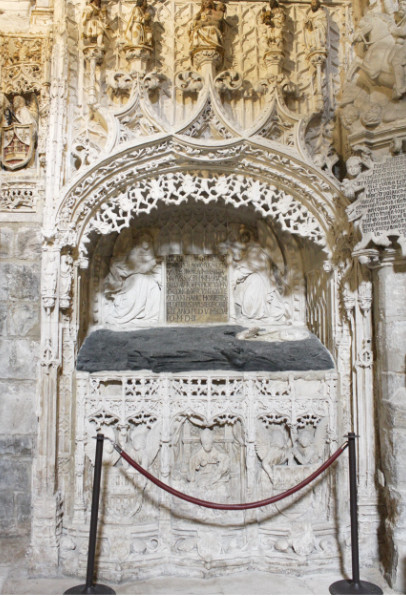
Tomb of Gonzalo de Polanco and Leonor de Miranda, grandparents of Juan Alfonso de Polanco, at the altarpiece of Iglesia San Nicolas de Bari in Burgos

At the age of 14 he began studies at the University of Paris, where his uncle would be rector. For eight years he studied classical letters, literature, and philosophy. In 1541 he obtained a position in the Roman Curia in Rome as a scriptor apostolicus and Palatine count with a salary of 1,000 gold ducats. The same year he came into contact with the group formed around Ignatius of Loyola and made the Spiritual Exercises with Diego Laynez. After this experience, he decided to resign all his positions and to join the group in his delay of Santa Maria of Astalli. In 1541, at the age of 24, he entered the Society of Jesus with fervent opposition from his father Gregorio and his brothers Gregorio and Luís. This will cause him to be rejected by the family nucleus. Ignatius sent him to the University of Padua to study theology, where he will befriend the Jesuits Pedro de Ribadeneira and Andrés de Brussi. In 1546, will be preach and give the Exercises in Bologna, Florence, and Pistoia.

=== Secretary and admonitor ===
In 1547, seven years after entering the Society, Polanco was appointed personal secretary to Father General Ignatius of Loyola. He thus became one of the most influential persons within the newly founded Society. On the death of Ignatius in 1556, he continued to hold the position of secretary and admonitor during the generalities of Diego Lainez (1558–1565) and Francisco de Borja (1566–1572). During the interregnum phases, he also held the position of Vicar General and was Assistant to the provinces of Germany and Brazil. During his period as secretary of Ignatius, he contributed to the drafting of much of Ignatius' enormous correspondence between the central house of Rome with the provinces in Europe and overseas. Some of the letters from Rome were signed with his own name. His work in drafting the Constitutions, which began in 1547, was also decisive. In 1562 he participated in one of the last sessions of the Council of Trent, where he made an important intervention on the priesthood.

=== Society historian ===
In 1573, on the occasion of the Third General Congregation that chose the new general, the doors of the generalate would be closed to him because of the pressure of factions of Italian and Portuguese Jesuits as well as of Pope Gregory XIII. This would lead Polanco after 26 years to leave the post of secretary, being replaced by Antonio Possevino. From this moment on, at the request of General Everard Mercurian, he would write the early history of the Society of Jesus, the Chronicon Societatis Iesus. The Jesuit historian John O'Malley thus valued the work:

The Chronicon dismantles the stereotype of a religious order under strict military discipline, where each member would be a peon who would act alone under orders from his superior. ... Polanco reveals himself as a sober, sincere, and even-handed chronicler, who also never eliminates the negative news simply because it is negative.

== Works ==
- Constitutions (ca. 1550)
- Breve Directorium ad confessarii ac confitentis munus recte obeundum Item De frequenti usu Sanctissimi Eucharistiae Sacramenti libellus, Colony: apud Maternum Cholinum, 1560.
- Methodus ad eos adiuvandos qui moriuntur: ex complurium doctorum ac piorum scriptis, diuturnoque usu, et observatione collecta, Venetiis: D. Zenari, 1577.
- Chronicon Societatis Iesus (ca. 1573–74), published as Vita Ignatii Loiolae et Rerum Societatis Jesu historia, Madrid, five volumes (or more?), printed by Augustinus Avrial, 1894–1898 (Monumenta Historica Societatis Iesu). Partially translated into English by John Patrick Donnelly, Year by Year with the Early Jesuits (1537–1556): Selections from the "Chronicon" of John of Alfonso Polanco, St. Louis: Institute of Jesuit Resources, 2004.

== Bibliography ==
- José Garía de Castro, Polanco. El humanismo de los jesuitas (1517-1576), Bilbao – Santander – Madrid: Mensajero – Sal Terrae – Universidad Pontificia Comillas, 2012.
