= Timeline of Burgos =

List of events

The following is a timeline of the history of the city of Burgos, Spain.

== Prior to 20th century ==
- 884 – Castle of Burgos founded by Diego Rodríguez Porcelos, the second Count of Castile.
- 1074 – El Cid marries Jimena Díaz.
- 1099 – Castilian military leader El Cid buried in Burgos Cathedral.
- 1187 – Abbey of Santa María la Real de Las Huelgas founded.
- 1221 – Burgos Cathedral construction begins.
- 1224 – Convento de San Pablo (Burgos) founded (approximate date).
- 1254 – Edward I of England marries Eleanor of Castile.
- 1301 – Cortes of Burgos (1301).
- 1302 – Cortes of Burgos (1302).
- 1308 – Cortes of Burgos (1308).
- 1315 – Cortes of Burgos (1315).
- 1350 – San Esteban church built.
- 1390 – Public clock installed (approximate date).
- 1408 – San Nicolás de Bari built.
- 1475 – Siege of Burgos (1475) at the Castle of Burgos, part of the War of the Castilian Succession.
- 1484 – Miraflores Charterhouse rebuilt near Burgos.
- 1485 – Printing press in use.^{(es)}
- 1494 – Consulado established.
- 1505 – San Nicolás de Bari church built.
- 1522 – Rebellion against Charles V. crushed.
- 1545 – Casa de Miranda built.
- 1560 – The Court removed to Madrid.
- 1562 – Arco de Santa María built.
- 1567 – Burgos Cathedral construction completed.
- 1574 – Roman Catholic diocese of Burgos established.
- 1808 – 10 November: Battle of Burgos; French win.
- 1812 – Siege of Burgos by Anglo-Portuguese Army during the Peninsular War.
- 1833 – City becomes seat of Province of Burgos.
- 1836 – Paseo de la Isla promenade created.
- 1842 – Population: 15,924.
- 1857 – Population: 26,086.
- 1858 – Teatro Principal (Burgos) (theatre) opens.
- 1871 – Biblioteca Pública del Estado (Burgos) (library) opens.
- 1878 – Museo Arqueológico y de Bellas Artes (museum) active.
- 1887 – Chamber of Commerce established.
- 1891 – Diario de Burgos newspaper begins publication.
- 1900 – Population: 30,167.

== 20th century ==
- 1902 – North train station built.^{(es)}
- 1907 – Palacio de Capitanía General (Burgos) built.
- 1930
  - Artificial silk factory begins operating.
  - Population: 40,061.
- 1936
  - 24 July: At the start of the Spanish Civil War, nationalists declare a government in the form of the National Defense Council, which meets for the first time in Burgos.
  - 29 September: Nationalist junta in Burgos declares Franco Generalísimo.
  - Burgos becomes capital of the Francoist Zona sublevada.^{(es)}
- 1944 – Estación de autobuses de Burgos (bus depot) opens.
- 1955 – Gamonal becomes part of the city of Burgos.
- 1964 – Estadio El Plantío (stadium) opens.
- 1970
  - Burgos trials (Proceso de Burgos) held in Burgos.
  - Population: 119,915.
- 1971 – Santa María de Garoña Nuclear Power Plant commissioned in region of city of Burgos.
- 1979 – José María Peña San Martín becomes mayor.
- 1981 – Population: 156,449.
- 1983 – City becomes part of the autonomous community of Castile and León.
- 1985 – Burgos Municipal Archives moves into the Palacio de Castilfalé.
- 1994
  - Caso de la construcción corruption scandal sentencing decided.
  - Burgos CF (football club) formed.
  - University of Burgos founded.

== 21st century ==
- 2007 – Transporte metropolitano de Burgos begins operating.
- 2008
  - Burgos Airport terminal built.
  - Bulevar del Ferrocarril redesign begins.
  - Burgos-Rosa de Lima railway station (train station) built.
- 2009 – 29 July: 2009 Burgos bombing by ETA.
- 2010 – Museum of Human Evolution opens.
- 2011
  - Javier Lacalle becomes mayor.
  - Population: 178,864.
- 2012 – Burgos Convention Centre built.
- 2014 – January: 2014 Gamonal protest.

== See also ==
- Burgos history
- List of mayors of Burgos
- List of bishops of Burgos
- History of Burgos province
- Timelines of other cities in the autonomous community of Castile and León: Salamanca, Valladolid

== Bibliography ==
=== in English ===
- Abraham Rees (1819), "Burgos", The Cyclopaedia, London: Longman, Hurst, Rees, Orme & Brown
- Josiah Conder (1830), "Burgos", The Modern Traveller, London: J.Duncan
- Richard Ford (1890), "Burgos", Handbook for Travellers in Spain, vol. 1 (7th ed.), London: J. Murray, p. 12
- Herbermann, Charles George (1908). "Burgos". Catholic Encyclopedia. New York.
- "Burgos (city)" . Encyclopædia Britannica. Vol. 4 (11th ed.). 1910. p. 819.
- Benjamin Vincent (1910), "Burgos", Haydn's Dictionary of Dates (25th ed.), London: Ward, Lock & Co., hdl:2027/uc2.ark:/13960/t41r6xh8t
- "Burgos", Spain and Portugal (4th ed.), Leipzig: Karl Baedeker, 1913, hdl:2027/uc2.ark:/13960/t5q81nw29 – via HathiTrust
- Trudy Ring, ed. (1995). "Burgos". Southern Europe. International Dictionary of Historic Places. Vol. 3. Fitzroy Dearborn. pp. 101–104. ISBN 1884964028.

=== in Spanish ===
- Guia general de Búrgos (in Spanish). Madrid: Aribau y C.a. 1876.
- Augusto Llacayo (1886). Burgos: catedral, Cartuja, Huelgas: curiosidades, cosas notables de Burgos y sus cercanías (in Spanish). Imprenta de Timoteo Arnáiz – via Biblioteca Digital de Castilla y León.
- D. Manuel Rubio y Borrás (1900). Nueva guia de Burgos y su provincia (in Spanish). Impr. sucesor de Arnaiz.
- Luis de Pablo Ibañez. Burgos y su provincia: apuntes y notas para el visitante (in Spanish). Hijos de Santiago Rodríguez. circa 1921
- "125 añosimpulsando el futuro de Burgos" [125 years of progress in Burgos (timeline)], Diario de Burgos (in Spanish), 6 March 2012
