= Everard Mercurian =

Superior General of the Society of Jesus

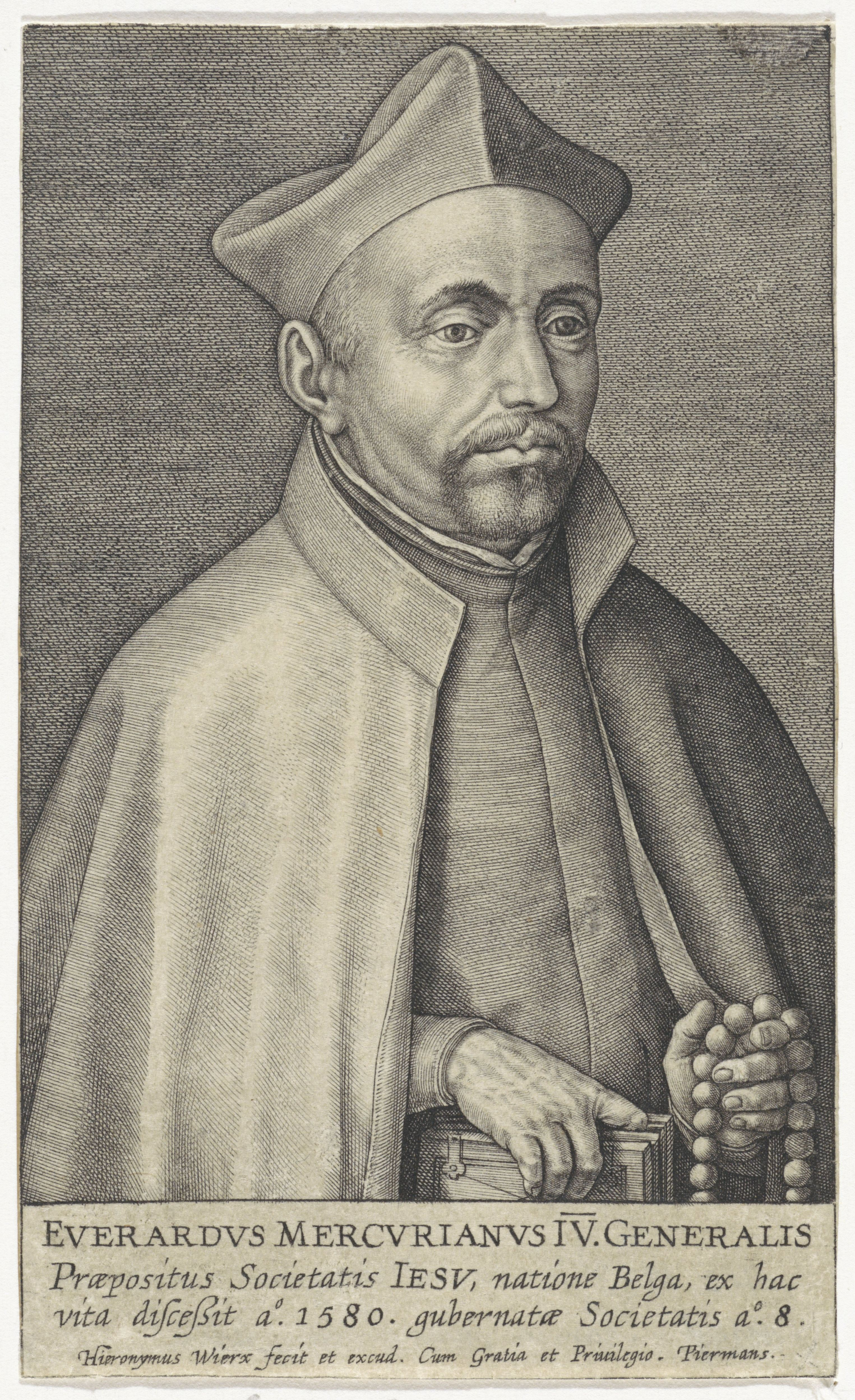
Very Rev. Everard Mercurian, S.J.

Everard Mercurian (1514 – 1 August 1580) was the fourth Superior General of the Society of Jesus.

== Early life ==
Born 'Lardinois' into a humble family in Marcourt, near La Roche-en-Ardenne in what is now the province of Luxembourg in 1514, in the south-east corner of what is now Belgium. This is the origin of his name, which he signed Everard de Marcour. After study in the University of Paris, he was ordained and became a parish priest. He became acquainted with Jesuits at the University and on 8 September 1548 entered the Jesuits in the Low Countries. The Society was expanding rapidly and he became Visitor of the German Province and later Provincial of the Lower German Province and lastly the German Assistant in 1565.

== General Congregation III (1573) ==
Francis Borgia, then Superior General of the Society, died just before the Third General Congregation was about to convene. Pope Gregory XIII, who was a good friend of the Society, expressed his desire that the delegates elect a General who was not a Spaniard. Thus Mercurian became the first non-Spanish general of the Society, even though Polanco, a Spaniard, seemed to be the natural choice. This, however, caused dissatisfaction and opposition among a number of the Spanish and Portuguese members, which came to a crisis during the generalate of Father Mercurian's successor, Father Claudius Acquaviva.

National sensitivities of the time are thought to have motivated the Pope. The first three Generals, Ignatius, Lainez and Borgia had been Spaniards and there was some concern that "New Christians" – converted Jews or Muslims, – might enter into the mainstream of the Society and Spanish Christians were more likely to have such backgrounds. Polanco, a close associate of St. Ignatius, was a Spaniard and was suspected of having a racial background that would not be acceptable. The Fathers of the Congregation voted 27 out of 47 on 23 April 1573 for the election of Everard Mercurian, a Belgian. It was a choice which pleased the Pope because Mercurian was a good friend, a non-Spaniard, and avoided criticism of his racial background.

== Achievements as General ==
=== Constitutions ===
Father Mercurian brought the rules of the Society to their final form during his seven years and three months as General, compiling the "Summary of the Constitutions" from the manuscripts of St. Ignatius, and drawing up the "Common Rules" of the Society, and the particular rules of each office.

=== English College ===
From his friend Gregory, the Society received charge of the English College and Gregory's beneficence to the Roman College was much appreciated.

=== Polanco's Census ===
During this time, too, Polanco traveled the length and breadth of Europe making a census of the Society's activities and of its men. When it was finally finished it filled six large volumes and gave a detailed account of the progress the Society had made from 1537 until the death of Ignatius.

=== Foreign missions ===
He was greatly interested in the foreign missions and established the Maronite mission of Lebanon. He appointed Alessandro Valignano General Visitor of all the missions in Asia (India, Japan, Moluccas). The Visitor had extensive power and changed completely the missionary outlook, insisting on the learning of the oriental languages, understanding and adopting local customs as well as admitting to the seminary and priesthood local youth. This new missionary approach allowed the emergence of such outstanding missionaries and orientalists as Matteo Ricci (in China) Roberto de Nobili (in India) and others.
He was very reluctant to get the Jesuits involved in the attempt to influence politics in England under Queen Elizabeth I, but he was finally persuaded to send Edmund Campion and Robert Persons to support the Catholics in England, with strict instructions to avoid politics or treason. However, Pope Gregory XIII met with Campion and Persons before their departure from Rome and completely subverted Mercurian's instructions. He had also, unbeknownst to them, sent support before them to the Irish rebel James Fitzmaurice, thereby seriously compromising their non-political stance.

== Death ==
Father Everard Mercurian passed thirty-two years in the Society, and died at the age of sixty-six. At that time the Society numbered 5000 members in eighteen provinces. He died, a martyr of charity, during the influenza epidemic of 1580 while visiting the sick in their homes. He was buried in the Church of St. Andrea al Quirinale, at that time the church of the Novitiate. Later on, his remains were transferred to the Ossuary in the crypt of the church of the Gesù.

Catholic Church titles
Preceded by Francis Borgia	Superior General of the Society of Jesus; 1573–1580	Succeeded by Claudio Aquaviva
