= Lope de Vega Theatre =

Lope de Vega Theatre or Theater (American English), Spanish Teatro Lope de Vega may refer to:

- Lope de Vega Theatre (Madrid), a theater in Madrid, Spain
- Lope de Vega Theatre (Seville), a theater in Seville, Spain
- Lope de Vega Theatre (Valladolid), a theater in Vallodolid, Spain
