= Ceceñas =

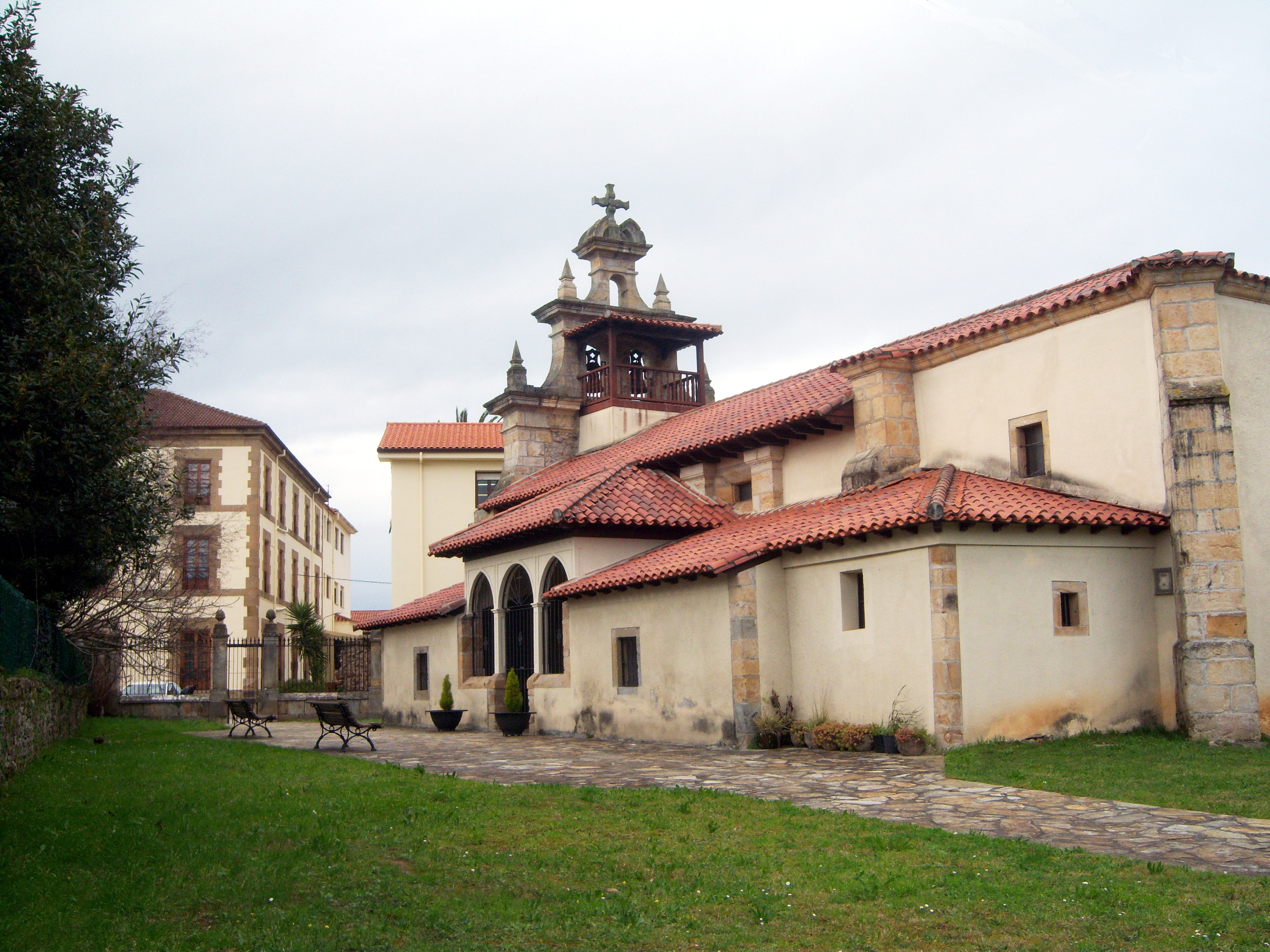
- Church of San Vicente de Ceceñas

- Location within Spain
- Coordinates: 43°22′25″N 3°42′58″W
- Country: Spain
- Autonomous community: Cantabria
- Municipality: Medio Cudeyo

Ceceñas is a community in Cantabria, Spain. It is located 1.8 kilometres (1.1 mi) from Valdecilla and 19.6 kilometres (12.2 mi) from Santander. Ceceñas is the birthplace of the architect Jerónimo de la Gándara (1825–1877).
