= Jerónimo de la Gándara =

Spanish architect

- Born: 1825; Ceceñas, Cantabria, Spain
- Died: 1877 (aged 51–52)
- Occupation: Architect
- Known for: Lope de Vega Theater, Valladolid

Jerónimo de la Gándara (1825–1877) was a Spanish architect who designed a number of public buildings during the reign of Isabella II of Spain.

== Biography ==
Jerónimo de la Gándara was born in 1825 in Ceceñas, Cantabria. He was a student of Antonio de Zabaleta. In 1848 he graduated as the first in his class from the Special School of Architecture of Madrid. He undertook further studies in Germany and the United Kingdom, and traveled throughout Europe. He was the first Spanish architect to gain first hand knowledge of the ruins of the Parthenon of Athens, making a drawing of their plans. In 1853 Jerónimo de la Gándara became a teacher at the Madrid School of Architecture, where he became a Professor in 1855 and held academic positions until 1873.

Gándara was a member of the commission that investigated Spanish monuments and reported their findings in the major illustrated book Monumentos arquitectonicos de Espana published by the state in 1859, with text in Spanish and French. In this role, he was involved in excavations, exploring ruins in central Spain that predated the Al-Andalus period, some from the time of the emperor Justinian I and his successors. He resisted pressure to attempt to move ancient mosaics to Madrid from the site in which they were found due to the great difficulty of preserving them intact.

== Works ==
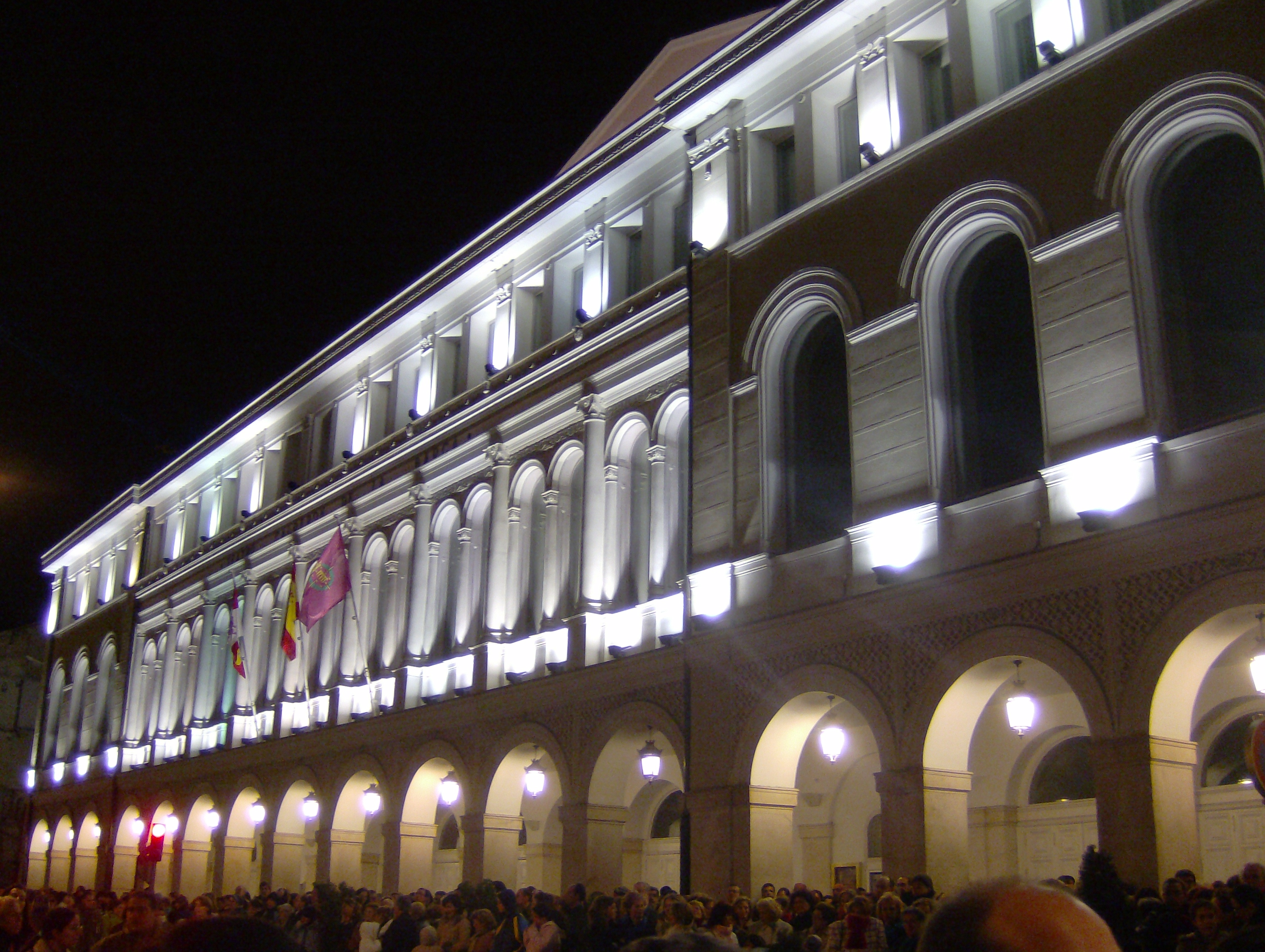
Teatro Calderón in Valladolid

In 1845 Gándara and Aníbal Álvarez Bouquet remodeled the facade of the Senate building. He designed the Teatro de la Zarzuela in Madrid, which was undertaken by José María Sánchez Guallart and opened on the birthday of Queen Isabella II in 1856. It provided a venue for "Zarzuela Theatre", which combines spoken scenes with scenes where the performers sing and dance. The original building burned down in 1909, but Cesareo Iradier later reconstructed it. The theater followed the Italian tradition, with a horseshoe-shaped hall containing three levels of boxes. In 1857 he designed the Palace of the Marquis de Viluma, which opened in 1859.

Jerónimo de la Gándara was the architect of the Lope de Vega Theater, Valladolid, which was inaugurated on 8 December 1861. The facade, restored in 1920, is in the classical style. It has two levels, each with three arches, and a pediment that holds a medallion with the likeness of Lope de Vega sculpted by Ponciano Ponzano. In 1864 he built the pantheon of Manuel Beltran de Lis, Minister of Finance of Isabel II, in the cemetery at the Sacramental de San Isidro. Another major work is the Teatro Calderón de la Barca in Valladolid. One of the largest theaters in Spain, it was designed in an eclectic neo-classical style. The Calderón opened in 1864. In 1867 he constructed the Spanish pavilion for the Universal Exposition of Paris in a strictly Neo-Plateresque style.

== Gallery ==
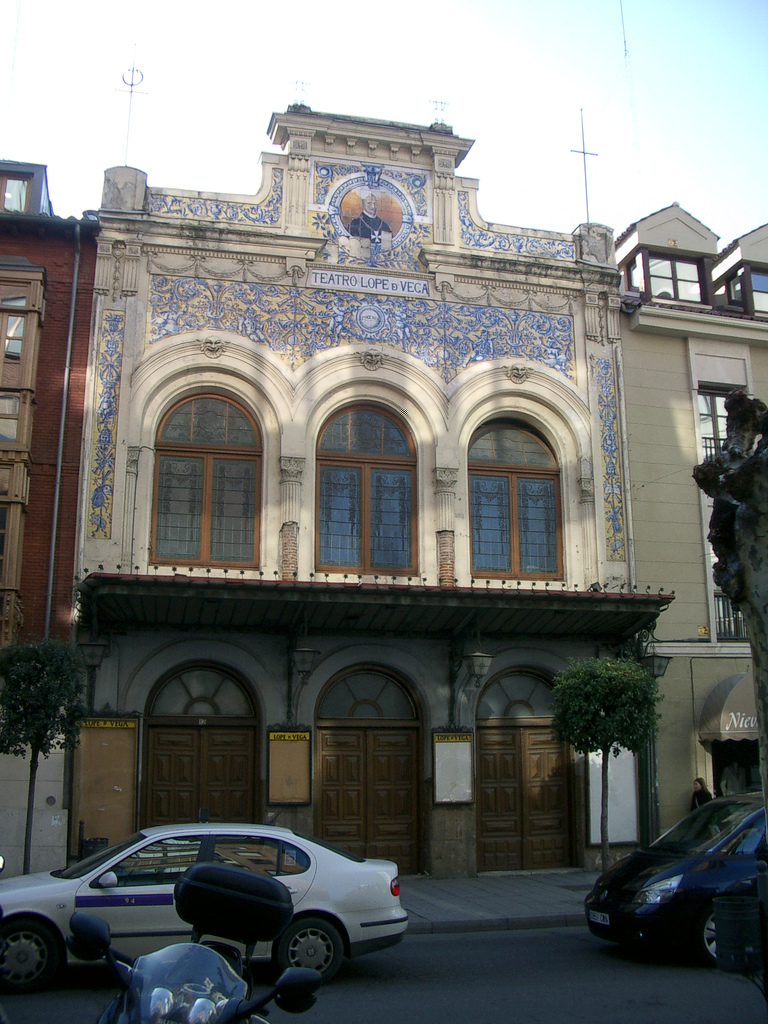
Teatro Lope de Vega, Valladolid

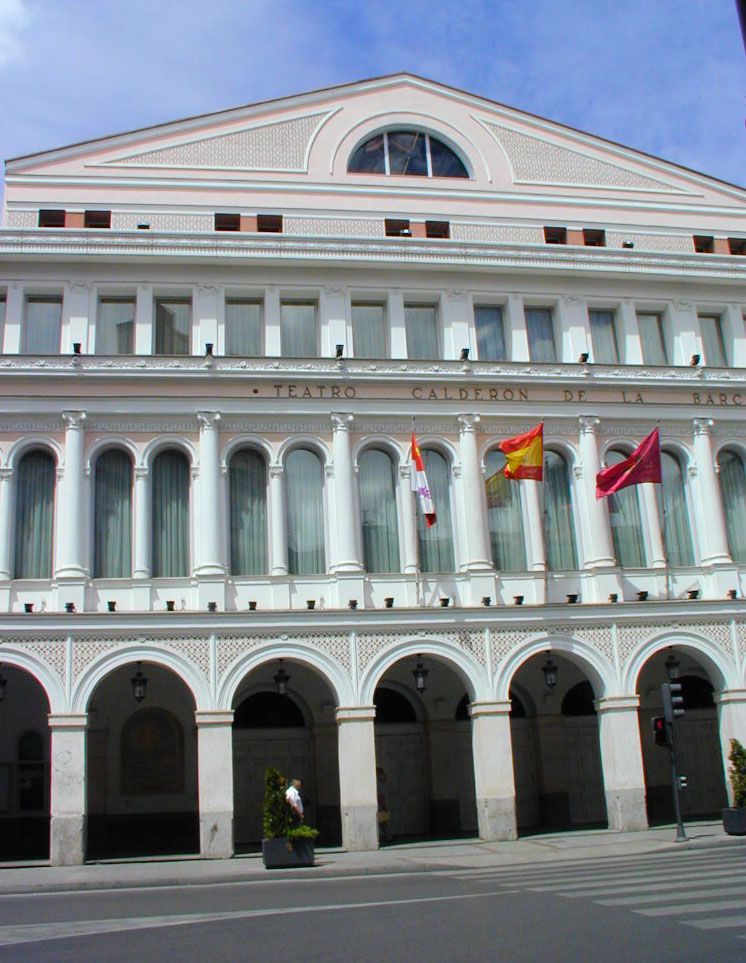
Teatro Calderón de la Barca in Valladolid
