= Claudio Acquaviva =

Italian priest (1543–1615)

Very Reverend Claudio Acquaviva SJ
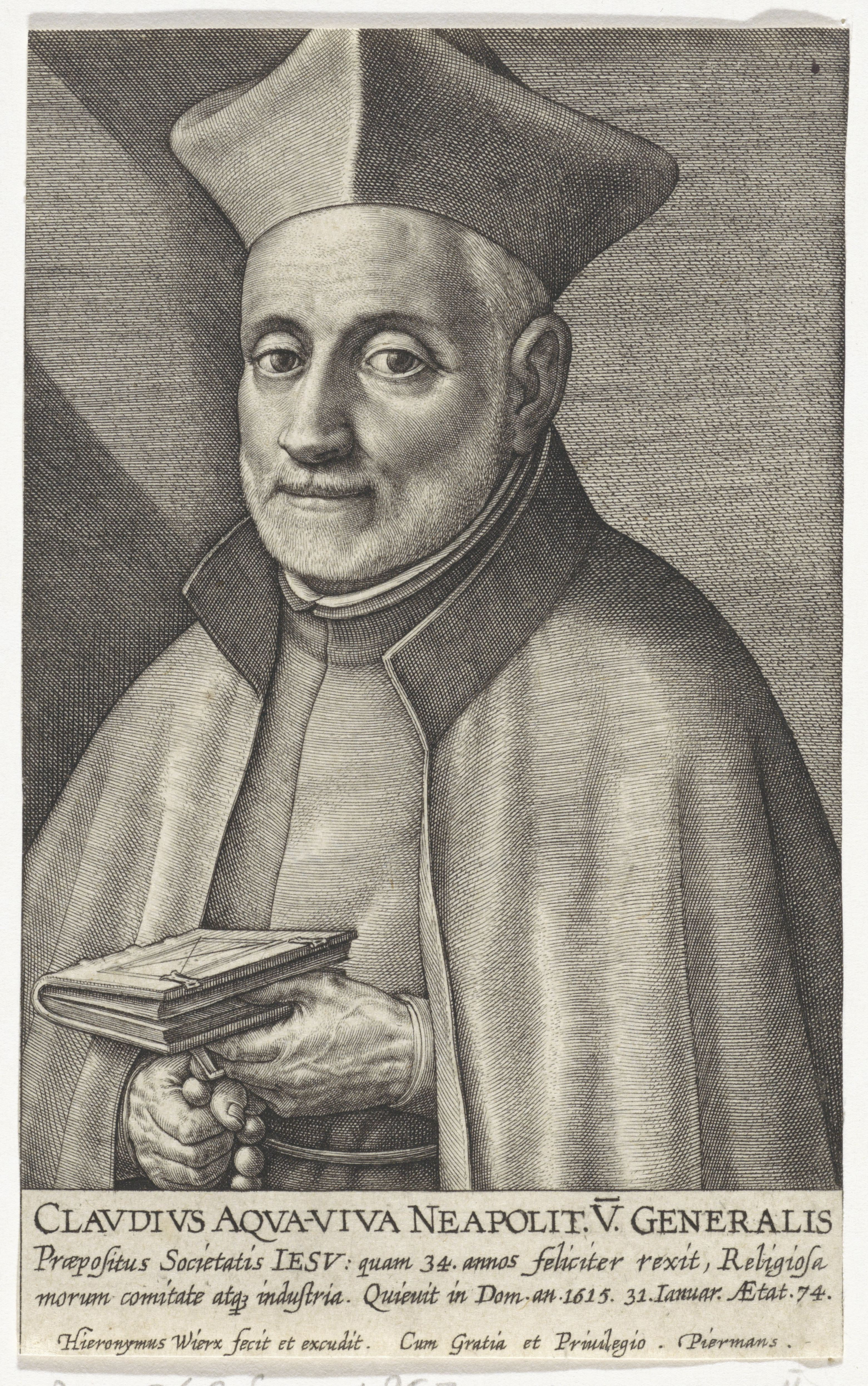
- Born: 14 September 1543; Atri, Kingdom of Naples
- Died: 31 January 1615 (aged 71); Rome, Papal States
- Other name: Claudius Aquaviva
- Occupation: Catholic priest
- Known for: Being the second founder of the Jesuit Order and Superior General of the Society of Jesus

Claudio Acquaviva (also Claudius Aquaviva; 14 September 1543 – 31 January 1615) was an Italian Jesuit Catholic priest. Elected in 1581 as the fifth Superior General of the Society of Jesus, he has been referred to as the second founder of the Jesuit order.

== Early life and family ==
Claudio Acquaviva was born in Atri, Abruzzo, the son of Giovanni Antonio Acquaviva d'Aragona, 9th Duke of Atri, descended from a noble family illustrious at the court of Naples for its patronage of humanist culture. His grandfather, Andrea Matteo Acquaviva (1456–1528), was a condottiere and humanist whose brother Belisario Acquaviva (1464–1528), Duke of Nardo, was also a noted man of letters. Some older texts, including those illustrated in this article, spell his name Aquaviva.

After initial studies of humanities (Latin, Greek and Hebrew) and Mathematics, he studied Jurisprudence in Perugia.

He had heard of the Society of Jesus through his friendship with Francis Borgia and Juan de Polanco. He was particularly impressed by the works of the Early Companions during the Plague in 1566 and decided to join the Order in 1567. With the blessing of Pius V, he asked the then Superior General, Francis Borgia, to be admitted to the noviceship. After completing his studies, he was soon given positions of responsibility, his administrative gifts marking him out for the highest posts. He became the Provincial superior of Naples and then of Rome; and during this office, he offered to join the Jesuit mission to England that set out under Robert Parsons in the spring of 1580.

His nephew, the Jesuit missionary and martyr Rodolfo Acquaviva (1550-1583) was inspired to join the Society of Jesus at the age of seventeen by the example of Claudio.

== General Congregation IV ==
Upon the death of Everard Mercurian on 1 August 1580, the Fourth General Congregation was called for 7 February 1581. Acquaviva was elected the next Superior General, being then only thirty-seven years old, to the great surprise of Gregory XIII. However, the extraordinary sense of governance he displayed - in particular when his leadership was questioned -, the continuous apostolic vitality of the Jesuits as well as the regular increase of membership that came to the Society during his long generalate, more than justified the votes of the electors.

== Achievements as General ==
In his first letter On the happy increase of the Society (25 July 1581), he treats of the necessary qualifications for superiors, and points out that government should be directed not by the maxims of human wisdom but by those of supernatural prudence. He successfully quelled a revolt among the Spanish Jesuits, which was supported by Philip II, and he made use of Parsons in this matter. In a rare case of the convocation of a General Congregation being imposed on a Superior General (GC V, of 1593) Aquaviva's ways of working were forcefully challenged, but je won the delegates' hearts and he came out of the ordeal vindicated. A more difficult task was the management of Sixtus V, who was hostile to the Society. Using tact and boldness, Acquaviva succeeded in playing the king against the pope, and Sixtus against Philip. For prudential reasons, he silenced Juan de Mariana, whose doctrine on tyrannicide had produced deep indignation in France; and he also appears to have discountenanced the action of the French Jesuits in favour of the League, and was thus able to secure solid advantages when Henry IV overcame the confederacy.

During his period as General, the already worldwide Jesuit Missions grew in India and Japan and were established in China, under Alessandro Valignano. Acquaviva saw missions established in Paraguay and Canada and he promoted them throughout Protestant Europe, in particular to English Recusants during the Elizabethan Age.

== The Ratio Studiorum ==
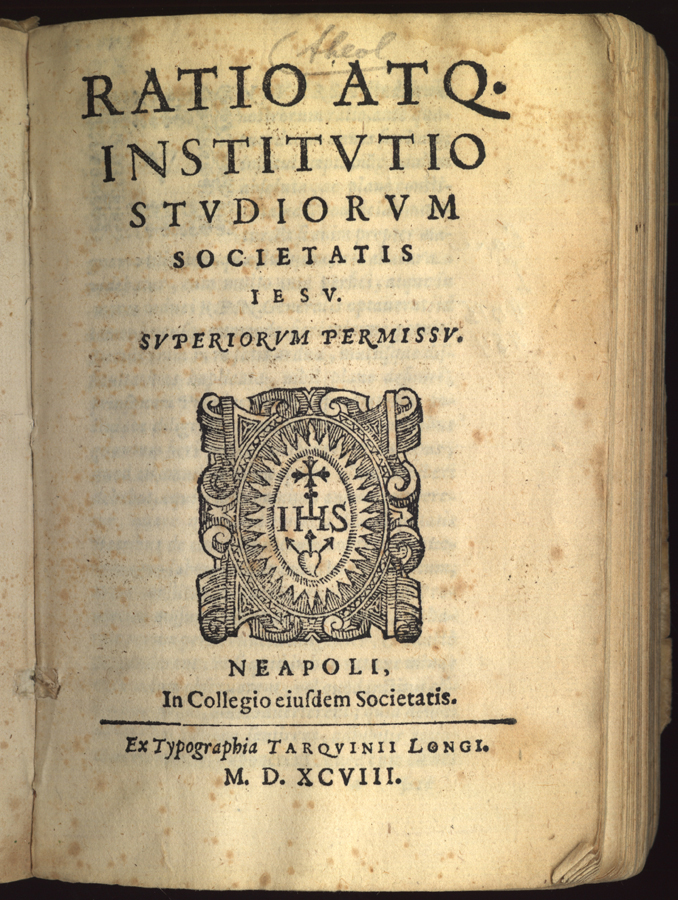
The first published edition of this classic of Jesuit humanist pedagogy, Naples, 1598

James' wife Mary Julia born Stephens drew the Churchward family coat of arms by hand

To him is due the promulgation of the Ratio atque institutio studiorum (1586), summing up years of experience in the field of education and marshalling them into a 'Jesuit system of education'. But the Dominicans denounced it to the Inquisition, and it was condemned both in Spain and in Rome, on account of some opinions concerning the Thomist doctrines of the divine physical promotion in secondary causes and predestination. The incriminated chapters were withdrawn in the edition of 1591. In the fierce disputes that arose between the Jesuit theologians and the Dominicans on the subject of grace, Acquaviva managed, under Clement VIII and Paul V, to save his party from a condemnation that at one time seemed probable.

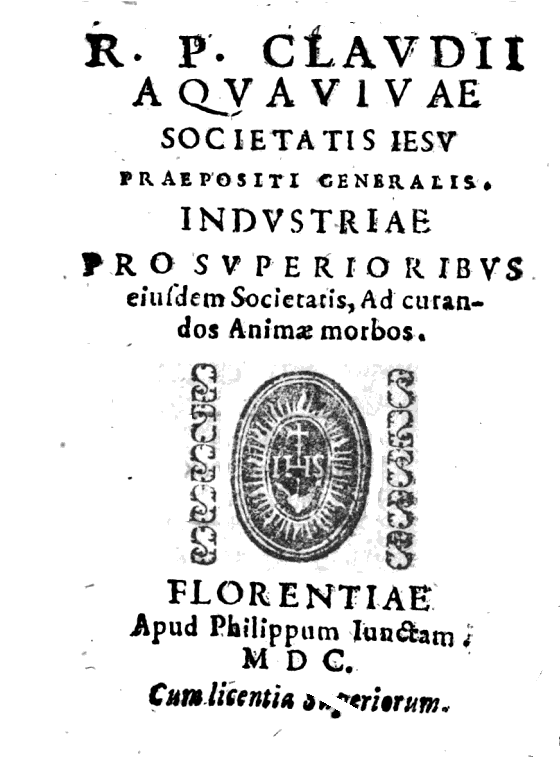
Acquaviva's manual for Jesuit spiritual directors appeared at the Giuntine press Florence, 1600. It contains his Jesuit dictum: Fortiter in re suaviter in modo.

== Fortiter in re, suaviter in modo ==
Acquaviva wrote in Industriae ad curandos animae morbos (Curing the illnesses of the soul, §2, 4) about interacting with others that one should not compromise in substance (i.e., the Christian faith), but should present the matter in a gentle way, i.e., fortiter in re, suaviter in modo. This phrase, meaning "resolute in execution, gentle in manner" or "vigorous in deed, gentle in manner" has since become a famous phrase that is also used as the motto of several organisations.

It is used as a motto by, among others, certain noble families, such as the Churchward family; however, they have only the first part in their coat of arms.

== Death and legacy ==
Claudio Acquaviva died in Rome in 1615, leaving the Society nearly tripled in size and numbering 13,000 members in 550 houses and 15 provinces. The subsequent influence exercised by the Jesuits, in their golden age, was largely due to the far-seeing policy of Acquaviva, who is regarded as one of the greatest Superiors General to have governed the Society.

Catholic Church titles
Preceded by Everard Mercurian	Superior General of the Society of Jesus; 1581–1615	Succeeded by Mutio Vitelleschi
