= Timeline of Salamanca =

The following is a timeline of the history of the city of Salamanca, Spain.

== Prior to 20th century ==
- 222 BCE – Forces of Carthaginian Hannibal take Salamanca from the Vettones.

- 89 CE – Roman bridge of Salamanca rebuilt (approximate date).
- 500-589 CE – Roman Catholic Diocese of Salamanca established.
- 712 – Muslims in power.
- 1055 – Muslims driven out.
- 1102 – Christian Alfonso VI of León and Castile in power.
- 12th century – Walls of Salamanca expanded.
- 1208 – Fuero of Salmanaca (civil law) created (approximate date).
- 1218 – University of Salamanca founded by Alfonso IX of León.
- 1401 – University's Colegio Mayor de San Bartolomé, Salamanca established.
- 1415 – University's Escuelas Mayores built.
- 1481 – Printing press in use.
- 1485 – Casa de doña María la Brava built on the Plaza de los Bandos (Salamanca) (approximate date).
- 1509 – New Cathedral of Salamanca construction begins.
- 1538
  - Palacio de la Salina built on the Plaza de Colón (Salamanca).
  - University's Palacio de Monterrey construction begins.
- 1590 – Population: 24,000.
- 1600 – University's Hospital del Estudio built.
- 1610 – Moriscos expelled.
- 1651 – Population: 12,000.
- 1667 – Iglesia de San Pablo (Salamanca) (church) built.
- 1734 – New Cathedral construction completed.
- 1739 – Iglesia de San Sebastián (Salamanca) (church) rebuilt.
- 1755 – 1 November: 1755 Lisbon earthquake.
- 1756 – Plaza Mayor, Salamanca (square) constructed; designed by Andrés García de Quiñones.
- 1812
  - 22 July: Battle of Salamanca fought near city; French defeated.
  - Mirat factory in business.
- 1842 – Population: 13,786.
- 1887 – Population: 22,199.
- 1900 – Population: 25,690.

== 20th century ==
- 1905 – Café Novelty in business.
- 1913 – Puente de Enrique Estevan (bridge) built.
- 1923 – UD Salamanca (football club) formed.
- 1930 – Population: 46,867.
- 1931 – Archivo Histórico Provincial de Salamanca (archives) established.
- 1946 – Salamanca Airport begins operating civilian flights.
- 1970
  - Helmántico Stadium opens.
  - Population: 125,220.
- 1973 – Puente de Sánchez Fabrés (bridge) built.
- 1983 – City becomes part of the autonomous community of Castile and León.
- 1988 – Old City of Salamanca declared an UNESCO World Heritage Site.
- 1991 – Population: 186,322.

== 21st century ==
- 2011
  - Alfonso Fernández Mañueco becomes mayor.
  - Population: 151,658.
- 2013 – Unionistas de Salamanca CF and Salamanca AC (football clubs) formed.

== See also ==
- Salamanca history
- List of mayors of Salamanca (in Spanish)
- List of municipalities in Salamanca province
- Timelines of other cities in the autonomous community of Castile and León: Burgos, Valladolid

== Bibliography ==
=== in English ===
- Josiah Conder (1830), "Salamanca", The Modern Traveller, London: J.Duncan
- Richard Ford (1890), "Salamanca", Handbook for Travellers in Spain, vol. 1 (7th ed.), London: J. Murray, p. 257
- Richard Stephen Charnock (1894), "Salamanca", Bradshaw's Illustrated Hand-book to Spain and Portugal, W.J. Adams & Sons, OCLC 36885426
- Robinson, Charles Walker; Jayne, Kingsley Garland (1910). "Salamanca (city)" . Encyclopædia Britannica. Vol. 1 (11th ed.). pp. 56–58.
- "Salamanca", Spain and Portugal (4th ed.), Leipzig: Karl Baedeker, 1913, p. 157, hdl:2027/uc2.ark:/13960/t5q81nw29 – via HathiTrust
- Trudy Ring, ed. (1995). "Salamanca". Southern Europe. International Dictionary of Historic Places. Vol. 3. Fitzroy Dearborn. pp. 596–598. ISBN 1884964028.
- David Gilmour (2012). "Salamanca". Cities of Spain. Random House. ISBN 978-1-4481-3833-3.

=== in Spanish ===
- G. G. de Ávila (1606). Historia de las antigüedades de la ciudad de Salamanca (in Spanish). Salamanca.
- Bernardo Dorado [in Spanish] (1861) [1763]. Ramón Girón (ed.). Historia de la ciudad de Salamanca (in Spanish). Imp. del Adelante, á cargo de Juan Sotillo.
- Salamanca, Ávila y Segovia. Recuerdos y bellezas de España (in Spanish). Madrid. 1865.
  - 1884 ed.
- Modesto Falcón (1868). Guia de Salamanca (in Spanish). Salamanca: Telesforo Oliva.
- Fernando Araújo (1884). La reina del Tórmes: guía histórico-descriptiva de la ciudad de Salamanca (in Spanish). Salamanca: Jacinto Hidalgo.
- Manuel Villar y Macías [in Spanish] (1887). Historia de Salamanca (in Spanish). Imprenta de Francisco Nuñez Izquierdo.
- E. G. Zarza (1976). Salamanca: Evolución, estructura, forma de pobliamiento, y otros aspectos demográficos, 1900– 1970 (in Spanish). Salamanca.
- F. Miranda (1985). Desarrollo urbanístico de posguerra en Salamanca (in Spanish). Salamanca.
- Salamanca: Geografía, historia, arte, cultura (in Spanish). Salamanca. 1986.
