= Teatro Calderón, Valladolid =

Theatre in Valladolid, Spain

Teatro Calderón de la Barca
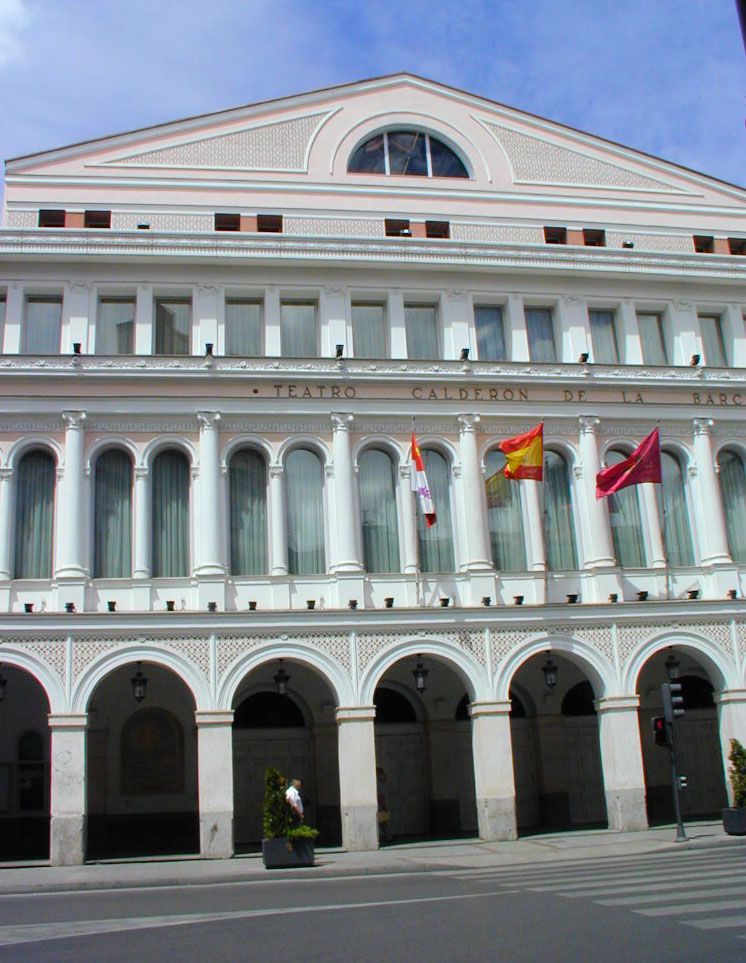

- Location within Spain
- Address: Valladolid, Province of Valladolid, Castile and León, Spain
- Coordinates: 41.654167°N 4.724722°W

Construction
- Opened: 1864
- Architect: Jerónimo de la Gándara

Website
- www.tcalderon.com

The Teatro Calderón de la Barca is a theater in Valladolid, Spain. It is named after the playwright Pedro Calderón de la Barca.

The site of the theater was occupied until the mid-nineteenth century by the palace of the Duke of Osuna, Admiral of Castile, which was demolished to make way for the theatre. Jerónimo de la Gándara was the architect. One of the largest theaters in Spain, the facade has an eclectic neo-classical style. The Calderón opened in 1864.

The interior has a horseshoe shape in the Italian style. The paint work, curtains and sets were created by the celebrated decorator Augusto Ferri. The Art Nouveau side lamps date from the early twentieth century. Other rooms were a coffee shop, a library decorated with many paintings, and a banquet room. The magnificent and lavishly decorated building became one of the main theaters in Spain when it opened.

Over the years it experienced ups and downs. Since 1973 the theater has been the permanent home of Seminci, the Semana Internacional de Cine de Valladolid, or Valladolid International Film Festival. In the 1990s a major renovation was undertaken by the architects Jaime Nadal and Sebastian Araujo, and on 9 April 1999 the theatre was reopened by Queen Sofía of Spain. Since then its stage has been used by several national theater companies, and by both national and international dance companies.

== Gallery ==
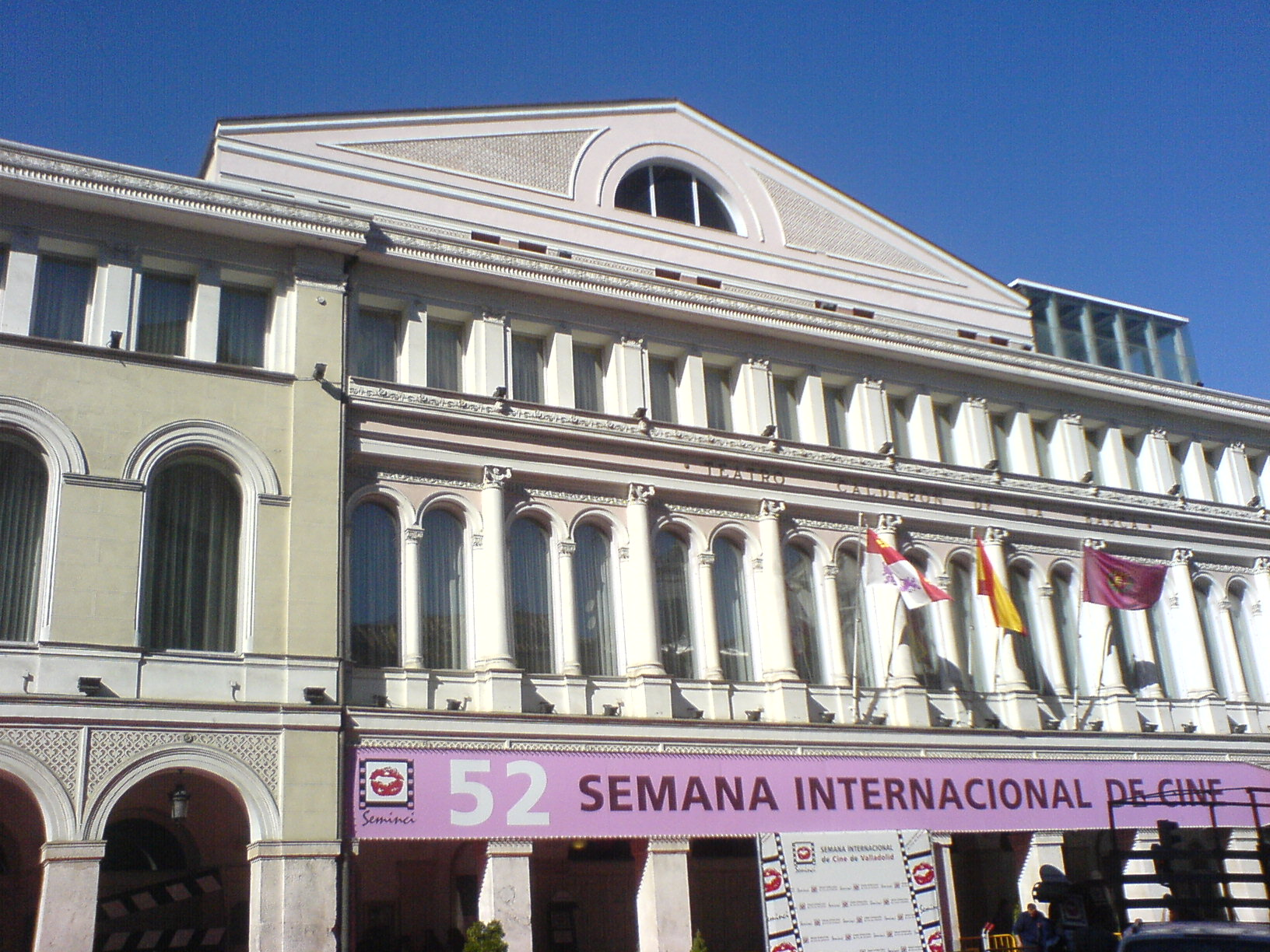
During the Seminci 2007 festival

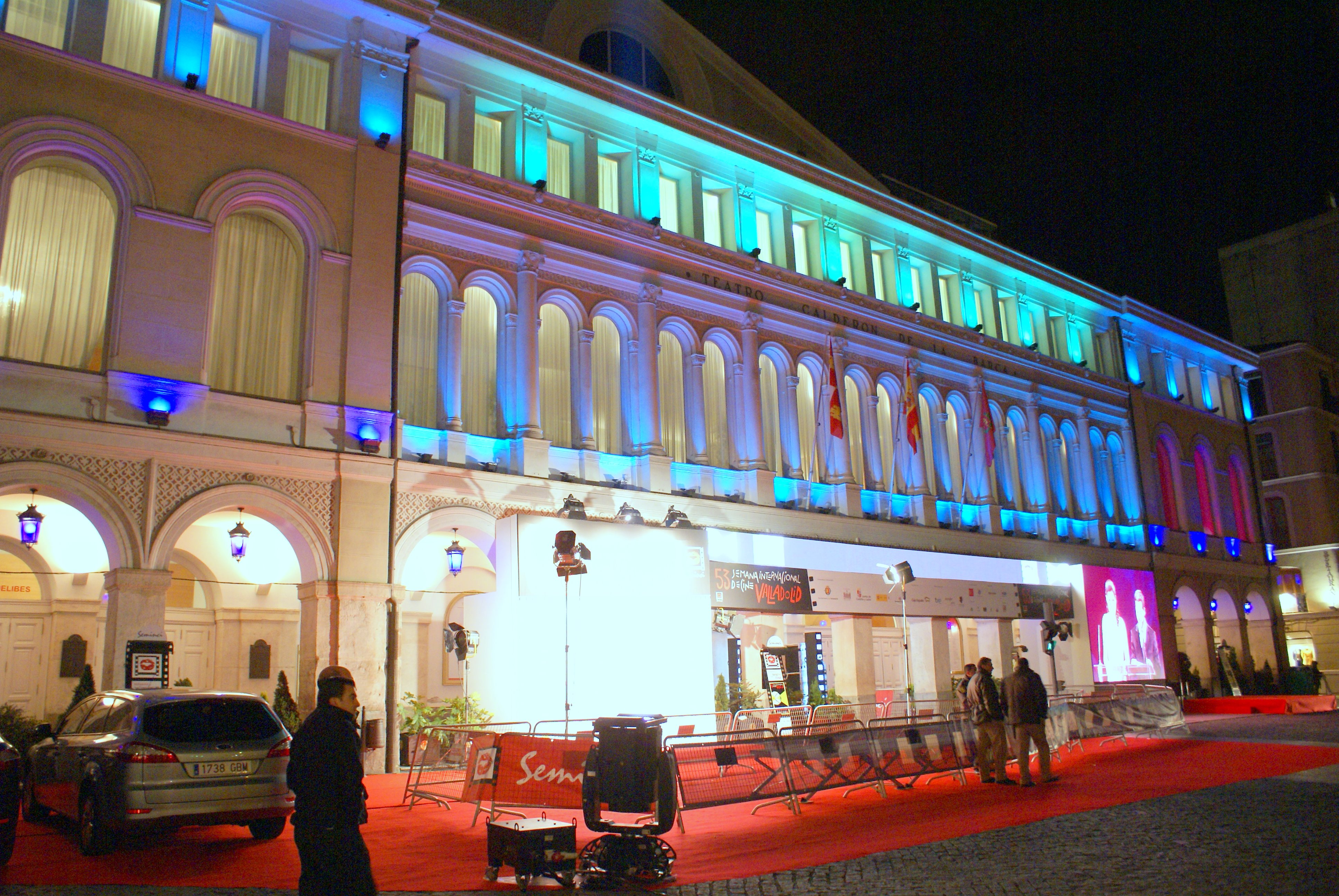
During the closing ceremony for Seminci 2008

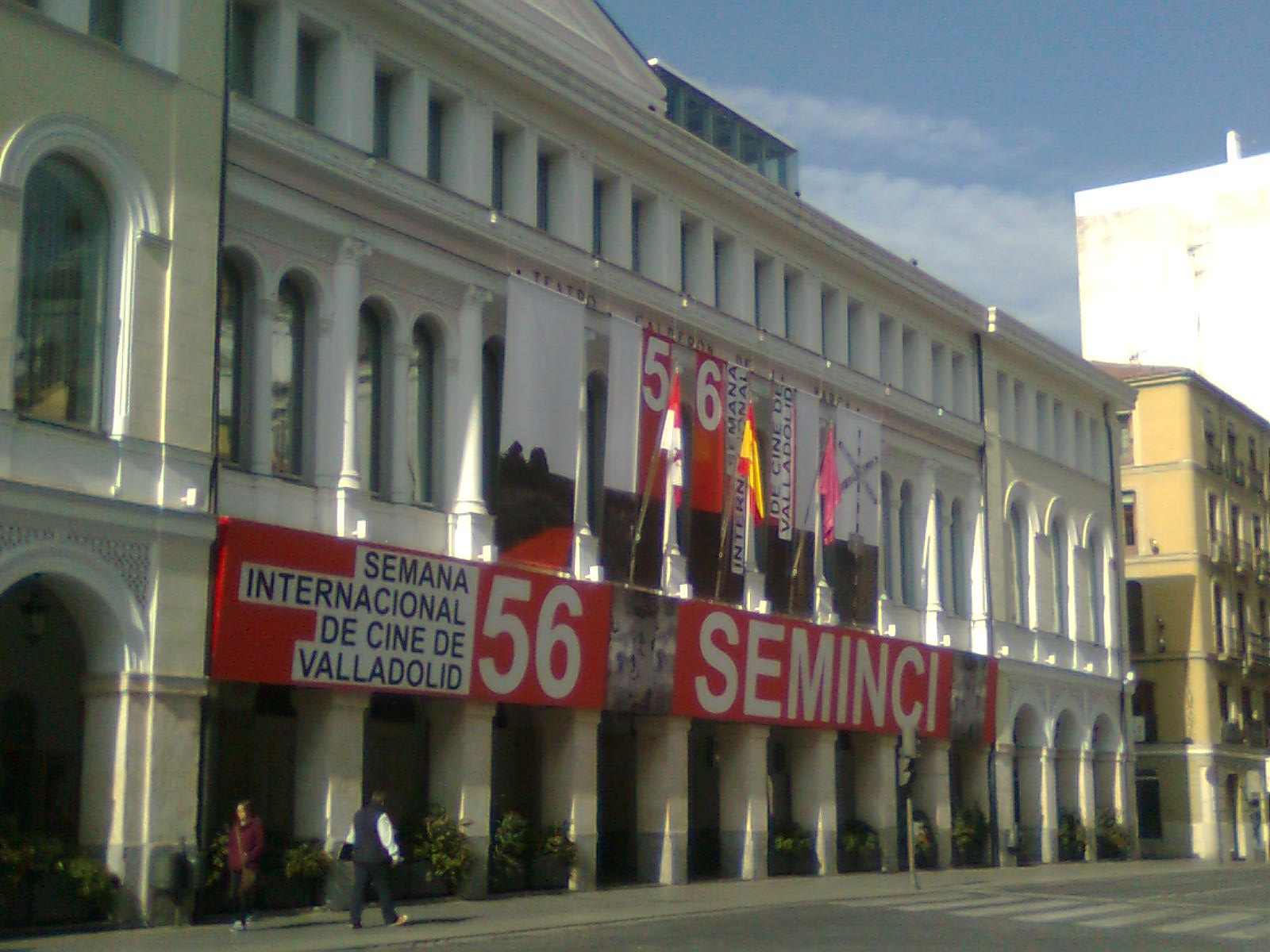
Seminci 2011

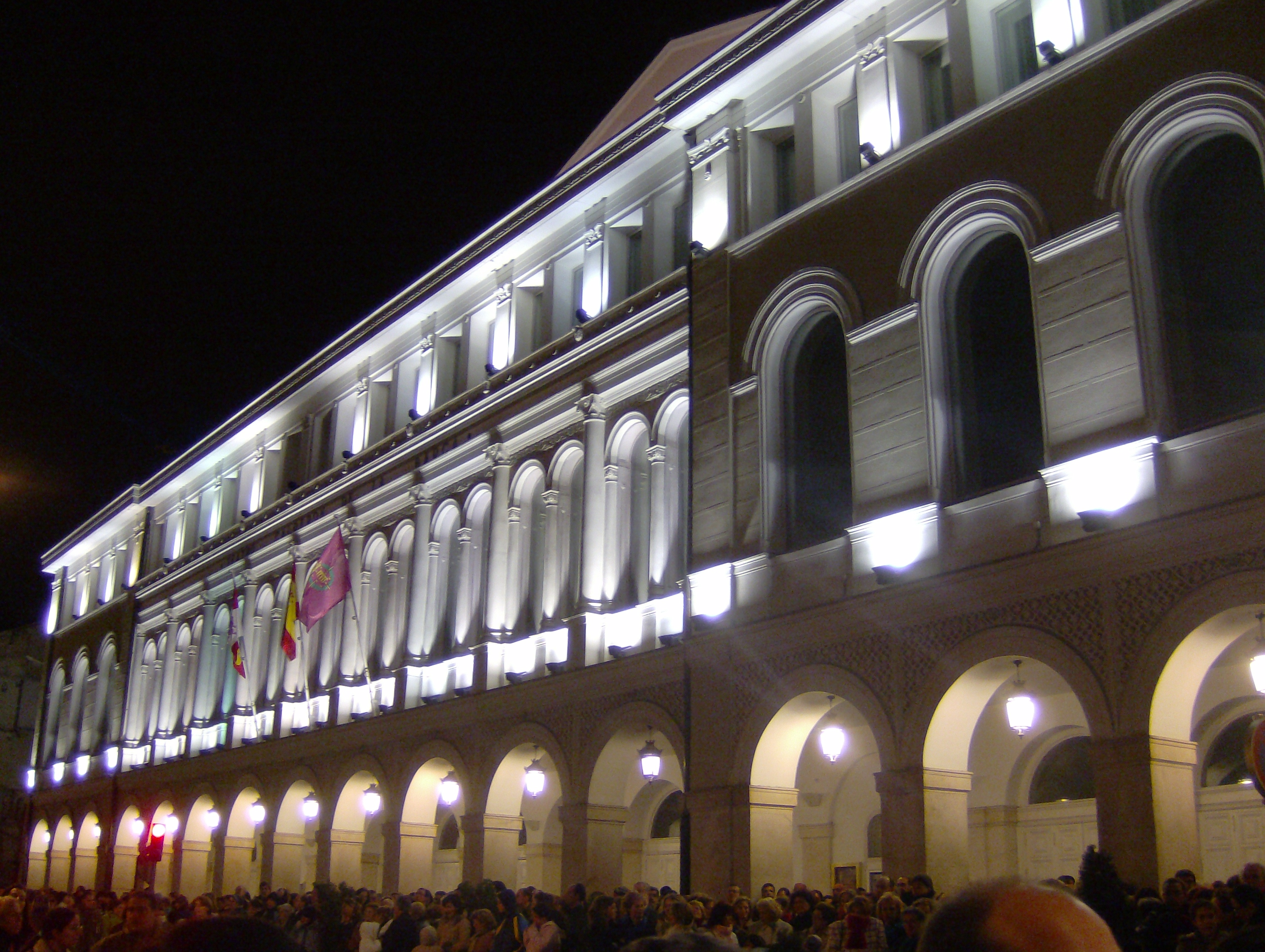
The facade at night

== Sources ==
- Ceceñas. "Personajes: Jerónimo de la Gándara" (in Spanish).
- Gómez, Antonio López (2001). Madrid Desde la Academia (in Spanish). Real Academia de la Historia. ISBN 8489512817.
- "Historia del Teatro" (in Spanish). Teatro Calderon.
- Seminci. "Historia del festival" (in Spanish). Archived from the original on 2010-10-03.
