= Marcourt =

Marcourt is a French surname. Notable people with the surname include:

- Antoine Marcourt (fl. 16th-century), French Protestant pastor
- Jean-Claude Marcourt (born 1956), Belgian politician
