= San Nicolás de Bari, Burgos =

Church building in Burgos, Spain

Coordinates: 42°20′27″N 3°42′20″W

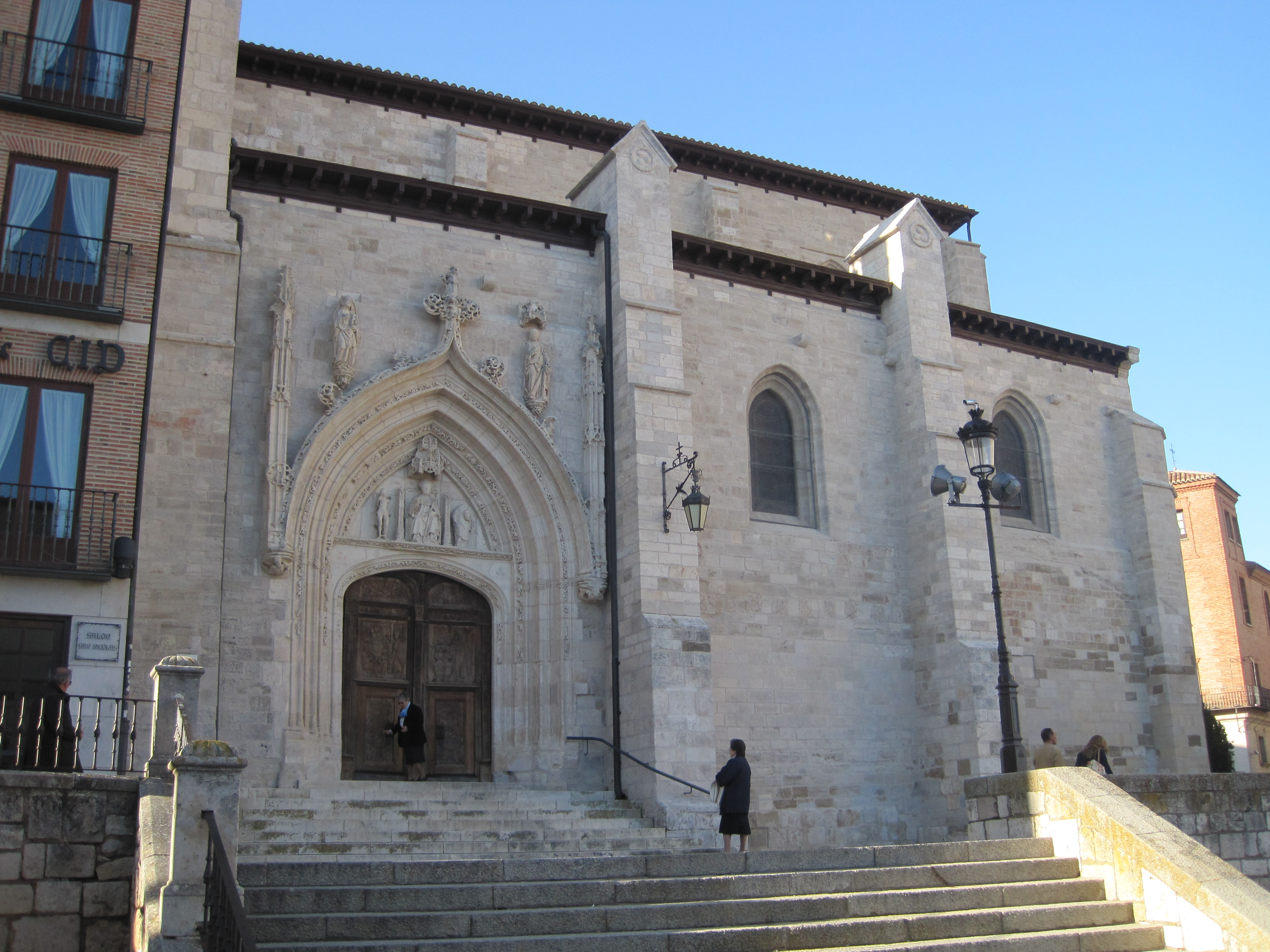
Iglesia San Nicolas de Bari behind the Cathedral of Burgos

Iglesia de San Nicolás de Bari is a Catholic church on Fernán González street in Burgos, Spain, located next to the Camino de Santiago, behind the Cathedral of Burgos. It is mainly known for having one of the largest altarpieces in Spain and the only one carved in limestone.

Since the Church of San Esteban was turned into a museum, it has served as the seat of the parish of San Esteban.

== Description ==
The church was built in 1408, replacing another Romanesque temple. Inside the temple presides one of the most monumental altarpieces of the Castilian Renaissance art, designed and produced in the fifteenth century by Simón de Colonia and his son Francisco de Colonia The altarpiece dedicated to St. Nicholas is an imposing retable that is unique among its contemporaries in terms of its size and its materials. It is both the largest lay commissioned carved retable from late medieval Burgos and the only altarpiece made from stone that survives from the city's late medieval period

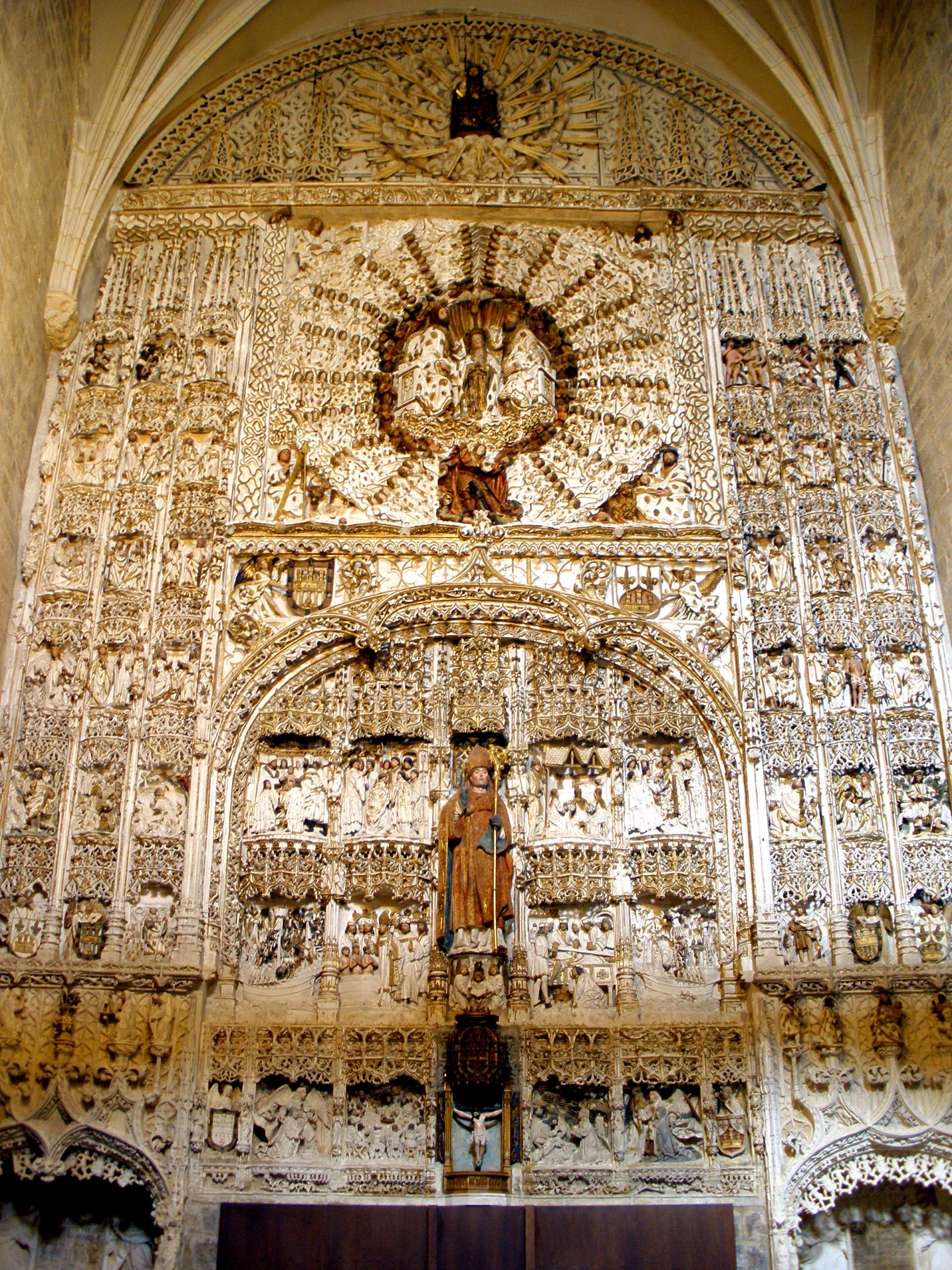
Main altarpiece of the church

This main altarpiece was financed by the Burgos merchant Don Gonzalo Lopez de Polanco prior to his death in 1505. The work measures 15.55 by 9.04 meters and is made of a porous limestone from Hontoria de Cantera, a small town in the province of Burgos. This type of stone was often used in the construction of buildings, including the Cathedral of Burgos and the Monasteries of San Pablo but was seldom used for altarpieces.

The high altarpieces from the Cathedral of Toledo (c. 1498–1504), the Cathedral of Seville (c. 1482–1492), the Carthusian Monastery of El Paular (c. 1490–1500), and the Cathedral of Oviedo (c. 1500–1505), are all of similar in scale to the San Nicolas de Bari's altarpiece but the majority of these works were carved from wood and then polychromed.

In addition to its Gothic tombs, the Renaissance arch of María Sáez de Oña and Fernando de Mena and the tables of the Burgos School of the Master of San Nicolás are also of great interest. Many of the works of art were also paid for by the Polanco family.

The Church of San Nicolas de Bari in Burgos was declared a National Monument in Spain on January 26, 1917.
