= Lope de Vega Theatre, Valladolid =

Theatre in Valladolid, Spain

Lope de Vega Theatre
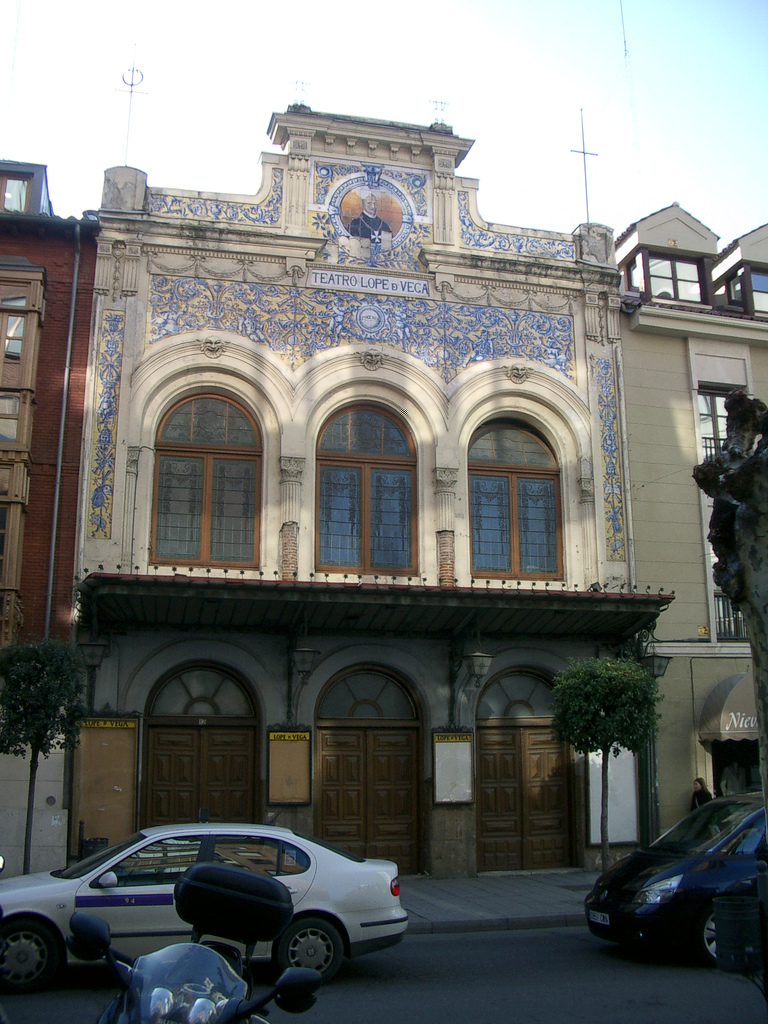

- Location within Spain
- Address: Valladolid; Spain
- Coordinates: 41°39′00″N 4°43′51″W

Construction
- Opened: 1861
- Architect: Jerónimo de la Gándara

The Lope de Vega Theatre (Teatro Lope de Vega) is a theatre in Valladolid, Spain, situated on María de Molina street. It was inaugurated in 1861, designed by the architect Jerónimo de la Gándara.

In the seventeenth century the site of the theatre was a patio equipped with a stage for putting on plays and covered boxes for the audience. The patio was covered in the eighteenth century, and the Plaza de la Comedia lasted until 1856, when it was proposed to replace the now-ruinous building with a new theatre. Jerónimo de Gándara was the architect.

The Teatro Lope de Vega was inaugurated on 8 December 1861. The facade, restored in 1920, is in the classical style. It has two levels, each with three arches, and a pediment that holds a medallion with the likeness of Lope de Vega sculpted by Ponciano Ponzano. More recently an iron and glass canopy was added. The theatre was renovated in 1960, reopening as a cinema and theatre, but closed on 30 April 2000.

The Caja Duero, a bank, bought the run-down theatre for seven million euros in April 2006. In March 2007 it was estimated that another seven million euros would be needed to rehabilitate the theatre. Given the high cost, there were delays in getting the project started. In August 2008 the president of the bank confirmed that they had received an offer to buy the theatre and convert it for use as a gaming room. In August 2008 the mayor of Valladollid, Francisco Javier León de la Riva, said he was confident that work would be started to undertake a major restoration for the listed building. The project was sponsored by the Caja Duero and had strong public support.
