= Miraflores Charterhouse =

Monastery near Burgos, Spain

Coordinates: 42°20′14″N 3°39′25″W

- Cartuja de Miraflores (Spanish)
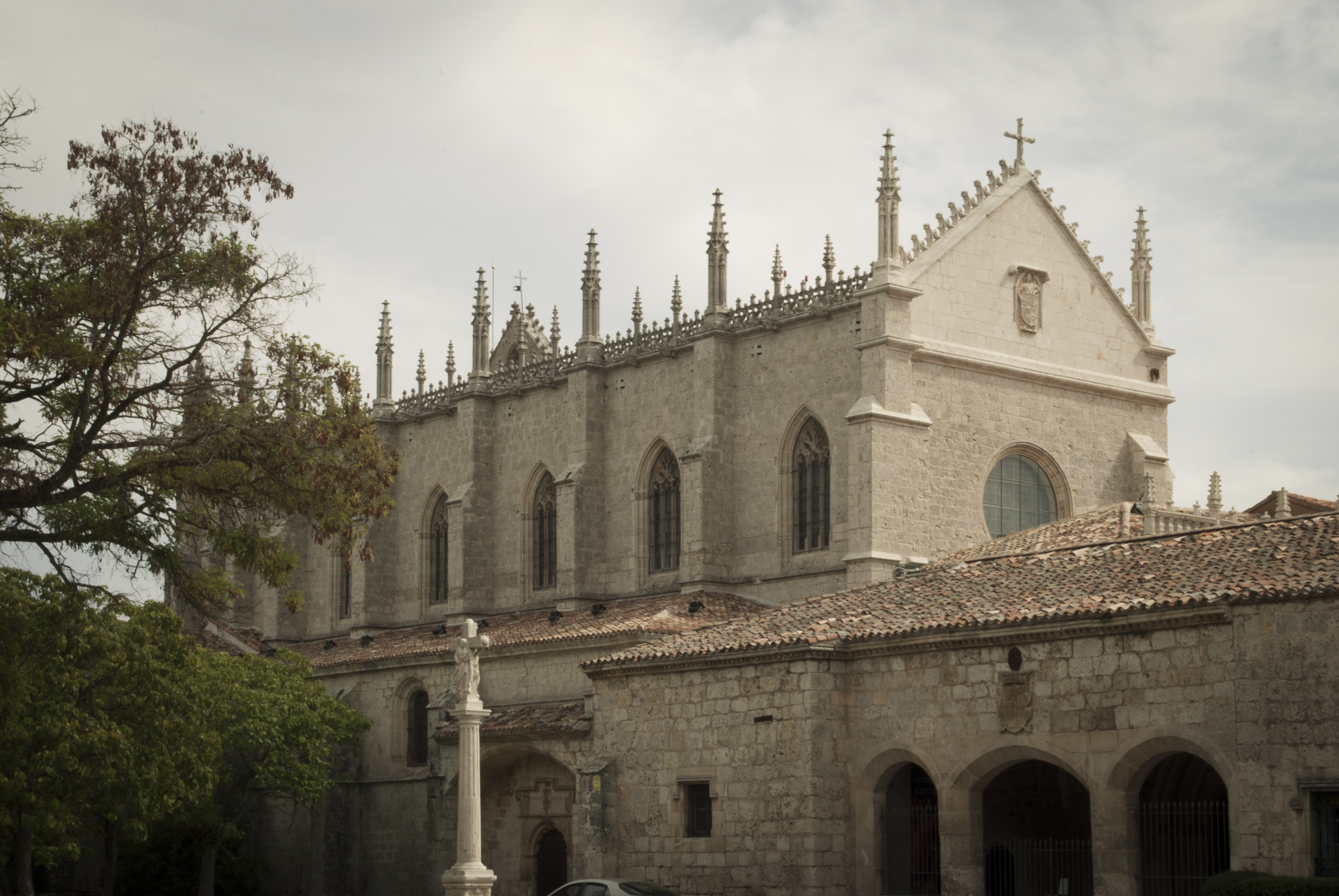
- The church from the north-west

- Location within Spain
- Location: Burgos, Castile and León, Spain

History
- Founded: 1442
- Built: 1401
- Rebuilt: 1454-1484

Site notes
- Architect(s): Juan de Colonia and Simón de Colonia
- Architectural style: Isabelline style
- Restored: July 28, 1484
- Governing body: Carthusian Order

Spanish Cultural Heritage
- Official name: Cartuja de Miraflores
- Type: Non-movable
- Criteria: Monument
- Designated: January 5, 1923
- Reference no.: RI-51-0000238

Miraflores Charterhouse (Spanish: Cartuja de Miraflores) is an active Isabelline style charterhouse, or monastery of the Carthusian Order, built on a hill (known as Miraflores) about three kilometres from the city of Burgos, in Castile and León, Spain. The monastery was founded in 1442 by John II of Castile, on the site of an earlier hunting lodge. It is noted for its late Gothic architecture, and especially its royal tombs.

== Location and access ==
The Charterhouse is 3 km east of the city centre of Burgos, in the Fuentes Blancas park, close to the Arlanzón River. The monument is easily accessible from the city of Burgos, and can be reached along an easy footpath in a natural setting. It is possible to go by bus or taxi from the city, and it has free parking for private vehicles and buses. It is freely open to the public.

== History ==
The interior of the church, looking east

In 1401, King Henry III of Castile built a hunting lodge on this site. After John II of Castile granted the lodge to the Carthusian order, the present monastery, dedicated to St Francis, was founded in 1442; the monks initially used the hunting lodge buildings. After a fire in 1452, the monastery was rebuilt to designs by the German architect Juan de Colonia (who was working at Burgos Cathedral), beginning in 1454. The building work was given new impetus by the coronation of John II's daughter, Isabella I of Castile, in 1474, the main campaign running from 1477 to the completion of the vaults by Simón de Colonia (son of Juan) in 1484. This was followed by the furnishing of the church, under the direction of the artist Gil de Siloé. Later additions to the fabric were designed by Diego de Mendieta from 1532 to 1539, and included the side chapels, crested parapet and pinnacles.

The monastery was abandoned during the Peninsular War, when it was looted by Napoleonic troops in 1808. The monks returned in 1814, but the charterhouse was dissolved in 1820, and assaulted by armed men from Burgos in 1821. The monks again returned in 1823, before being exiled to France in 1835 or 1836 due to the ecclesiastical confiscations of Mendizábal. The Carthusian monks finally returned in 1880, and still occupy the charterhouse.

== Description ==
=== Plan ===
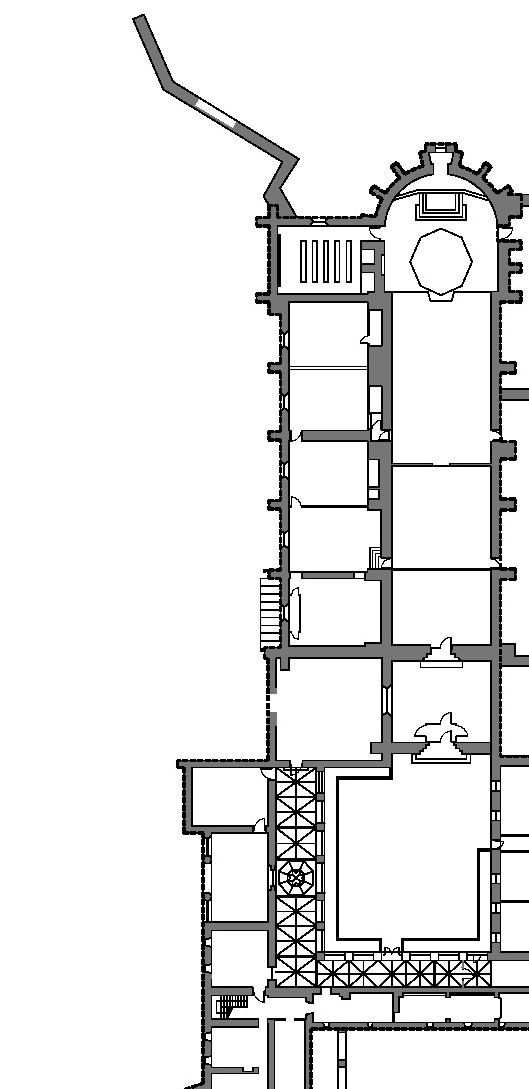
Plan of the church and entrance courtyard; the cloisters are cropped off to the right (east at top)

The floor plan follows that of other Carthusian monasteries. The church is aisleless, with separate choirs for the choir monks and lay brothers, and an apsidal east end, crowned by a lierne vault. To the south of the church are two cloisters, around which are arranged the monks' individual cells, divided into choir monks and lay brothers. This part of the monastery is not publicly accessible.

=== Exterior ===
==== Portal ====
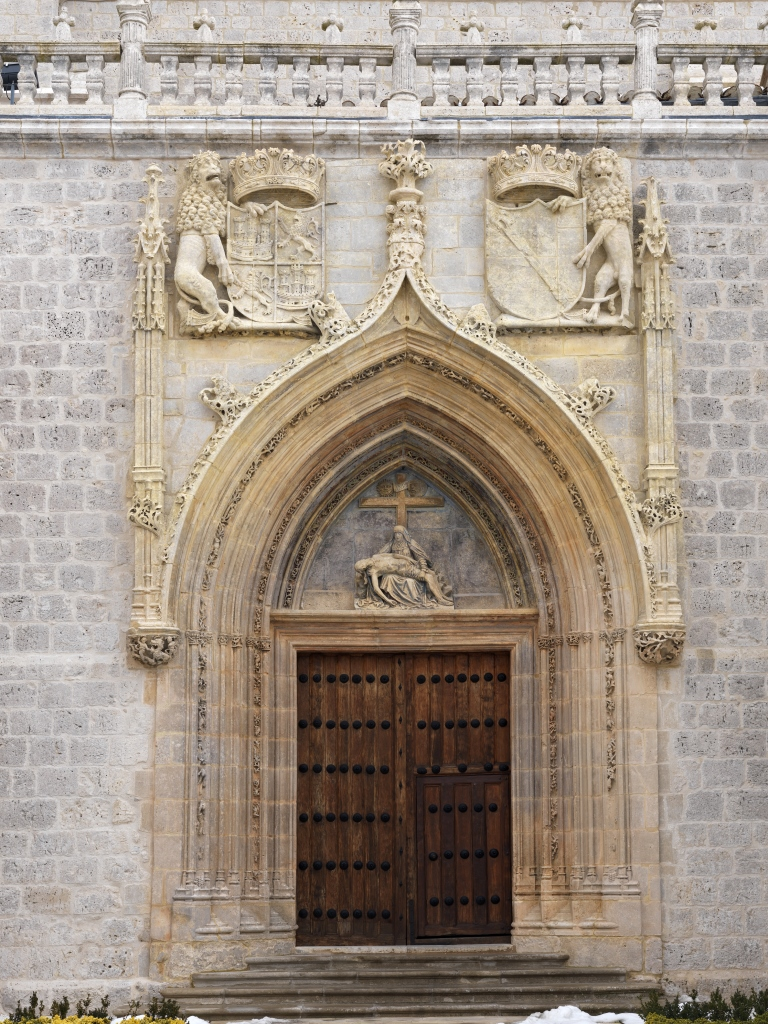
Portal

The church's portal was built in 1486 and was originally located on the north side of the nave, to admit laypeople. It has foliate and some figurative decoration under a crocketed ogee hood mould. The carved tympanum depicts the Pietà, accompanied by the moon and sun. Stylistically it is linked to the works of the Colonia family of masons, and also with the portals of other nearby monasteries, such as San Nicolás de Bari and San Lesmes Abad. Between 1657 and 1659 the portal was moved to its current location, on the west front of the church. It was restored in 2010.

==== Entrance Courtyard ====
Outside the church portal is an entrance courtyard, which contains a statue of Saint Bruno of Cologne, the founder of the Carthusian Order. The entrance's portal to the church of the Charterhouse is currently located in an entrance's courtyard landscaped with a 's statue, founder of the Order. It connected the service buildings of the monastery, and has a 16th century arcaded gallery on its north and west sides, also restored in 2010.

=== Interior ===
The high altar area, with the John II monument in the centre of the floor, the altarpiece behind and the Prince Alfonso monument to the left.

==== Altarpiece ====
The main altarpiece of the Charterhouse was carved in wood by artist Gil de Siloé, and painted and gilded by Diego de la Cruz (whose gold came from the first shipments of the Americas after its discovery) Made between 1496 and 1499, it is an important work of Spanish Gothic sculpture, for its compositional and iconographic originality and excellent quality of carving.

One of the most important elements of the altarpiece is the angelic wheel which frames the central Crucifixion scene. In the outer part of the wheel are placed the figures of God the Father to the left and the Holy Spirit to the right bearing the arms of the cross. Beneath the cross are the traditional figures of the Virgin Mary and John the Evangelist. The pelican above the cross alludes to Christ's sacrifice, as in medieval times the pelican was believed to feed her chicks with her own blood (an iconographic device known as "the Pelican in her Piety").

==== Royal tombs ====
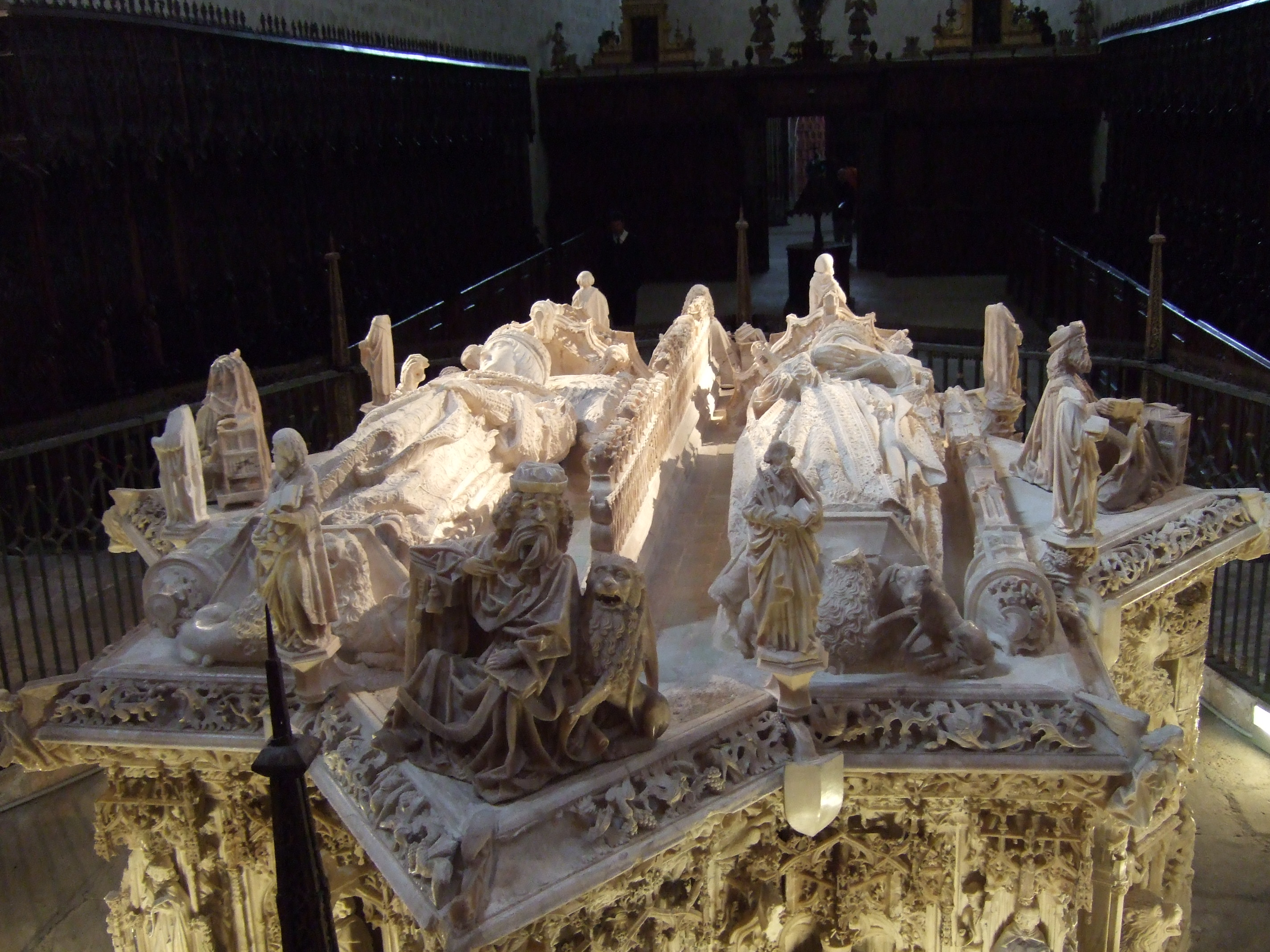
Tomb of John II and Isabella

The alabaster royal tombs were designed by Gil de Siloé and commissioned by Queen Isabella I of Castile. In front of the main altarpiece is the joint monument to John II of Castile (d.1454) and hhis wife Isabella of Portugal (d, 1496). The tomb is unusually shaped like an eight-pointed star, on which lie the fine effigies. To the north is the wall monument to Alfonso, Prince of Asturias (d. 1468, aged 14). The young prince kneels in prayer at a reading desk, within a fantastically ornamented Isabelline niche.

== Gallery ==
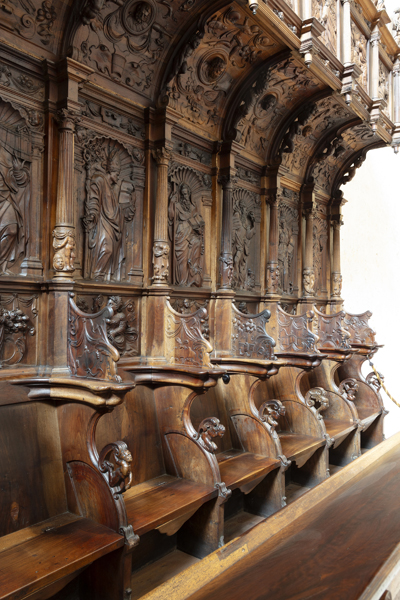
Choir seating

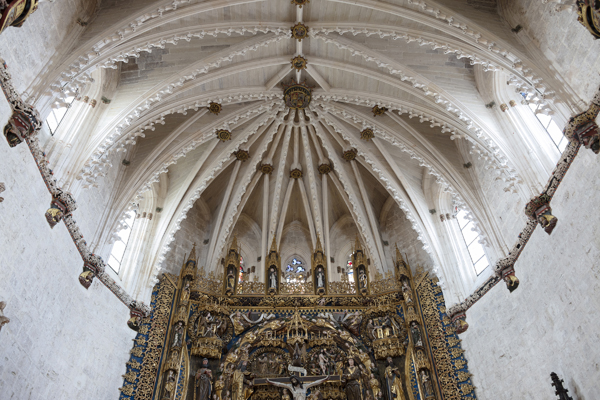
Choir vault

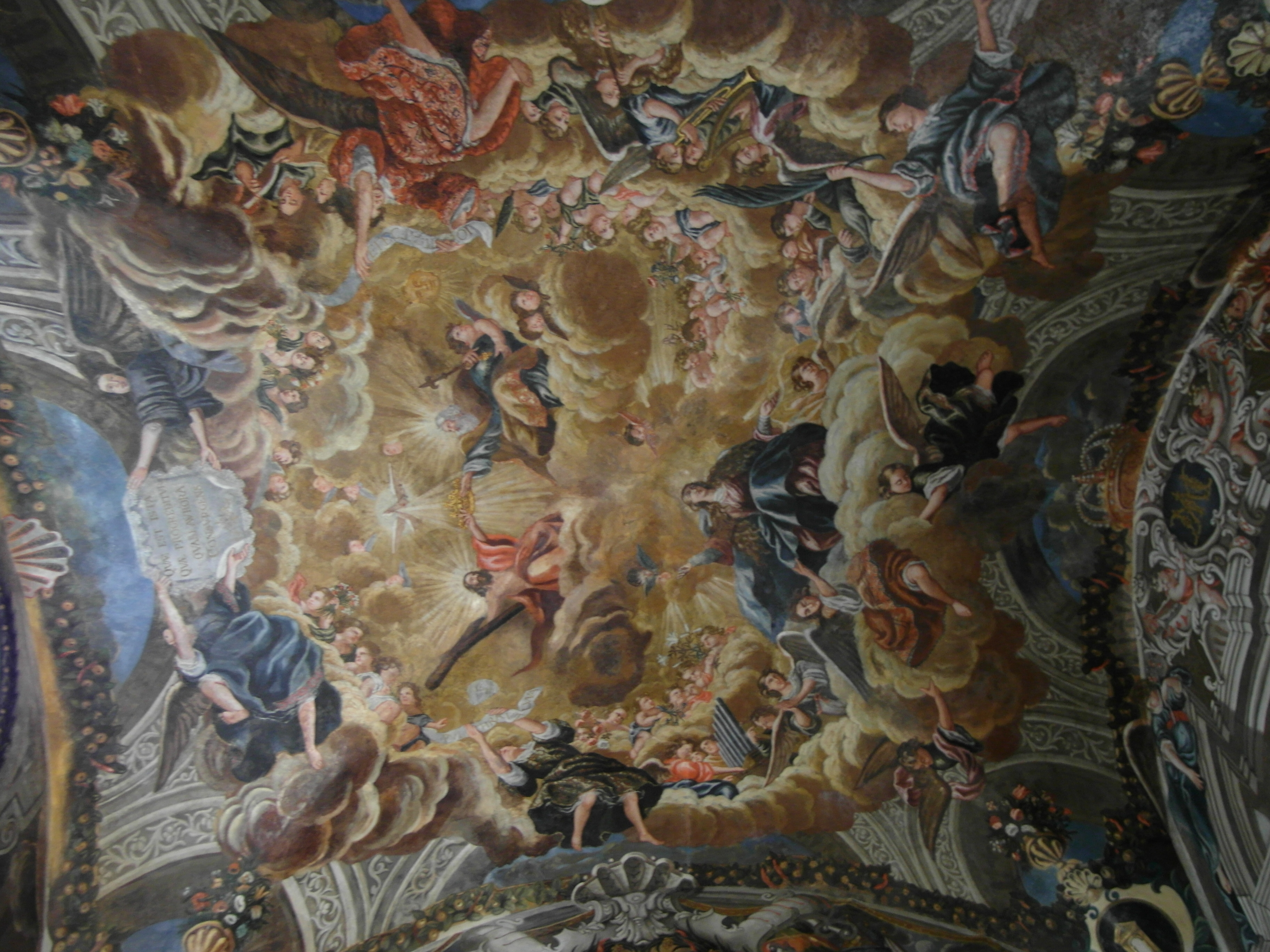
Dome of the Chapel of la Virgen de Miraflores (1539).

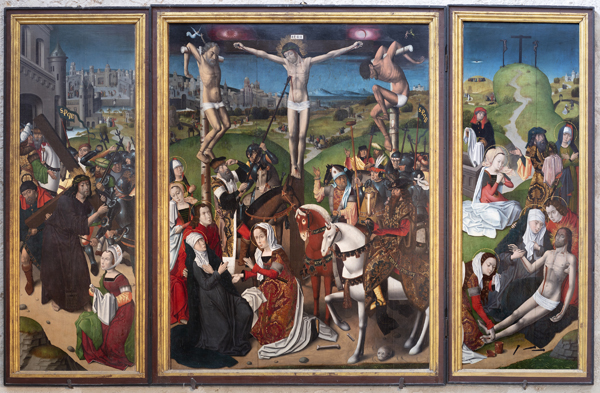
Calvary triptych

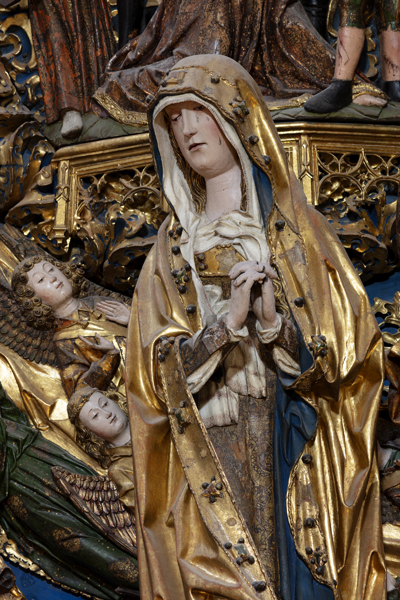
High altar (detail) by Gil de Siloé

== Sources ==
=== Written sources ===
The sources for the study of the Miraflores Charterhouse include writings of various kinds

- Compendium of the Libro becerro entitled Brief and compendious news of the foundation of this Miraflores Charterhouse taken from Libro Becerro with worthy of knowing's other news, and covering events and privileges granted to the Charterhouse from 1442 to 1764.
- Other sources, among which are the following contributions:
  - Iglesia, Fr. Nicolás, "Flowers of Miraflores sacred hieroglyphics, figurative truths, true shadows of the Mistery of the Immaculate Conception of the Virgin and Mother of God Our Lady Mary […]», Burgos, 1659.
  - Vallés, José de, "First Institute of the Sacred Religion of the Cartuxa: foundations of convents throughout Spain, martyrs of England and generals of the whole order" Madrid, 1663.
  - Arias de Miranda, Juan, "Historical Notes about Miraflores Charterhouse Burgos» Burgos, 1843.
  - Tarín and Juaneda, Francisco, "The Royal Miraflores Charterhouse (Burgos). History and description" Burgos, 1896.
