= Johannes of Cologne =

Johannes of Cologne may refer to:

- Juan de Colonia, architect
- John of Cologne, priest and a saint
