= Adelelmus of Burgos =

French Roman Catholic saint

Saint Adelelmus O.S.B.
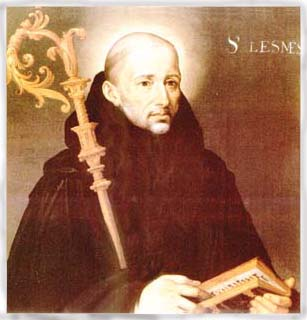
- Painting from the 17th century, Burgos Cathedral
- Born: 11th century Loudun, Poitou, France
- Died: 1100
- Venerated in: Roman Catholic Church
- Feast: 30 January
- Patronage: Burgos, Spain

Adelelmus (died c. 1100) (French: Aléaume; Spanish: Lesmes) was a French-born Benedictine monk venerated as a saint in the Roman Catholic Church.

== Life ==
Born in Loudun, Poitou, Adelelmus joined the military at a young age. During a pilgrimage to Rome, he met Robert de Turlande, founder of the Abbey of La Chaise-Dieu, and left the military life for the Benedictine order. He later became abbot of La Chaise-Dieu.

Queen Constance of Burgundy of Castile was impressed with the reports of Adelelmus' holiness, and invited him to live in Burgos, Spain. She and King Alfonso VI founded a monastery in the city in 1079 on the condition that he would be its abbot. He added a hospital and a church to the building soon after. He later used his military training to help Alfonso against the Moors.

After death, Adelelmus became a patron saint of the city of Burgos in Spain. His remains lie in the Iglesia de San Lesmes Abad

Adelelmus' feast day is kept on 30 January; it is no longer observed in the General Roman Calendar.
