= Diego de la Cruz (painter) =

Spanish painter

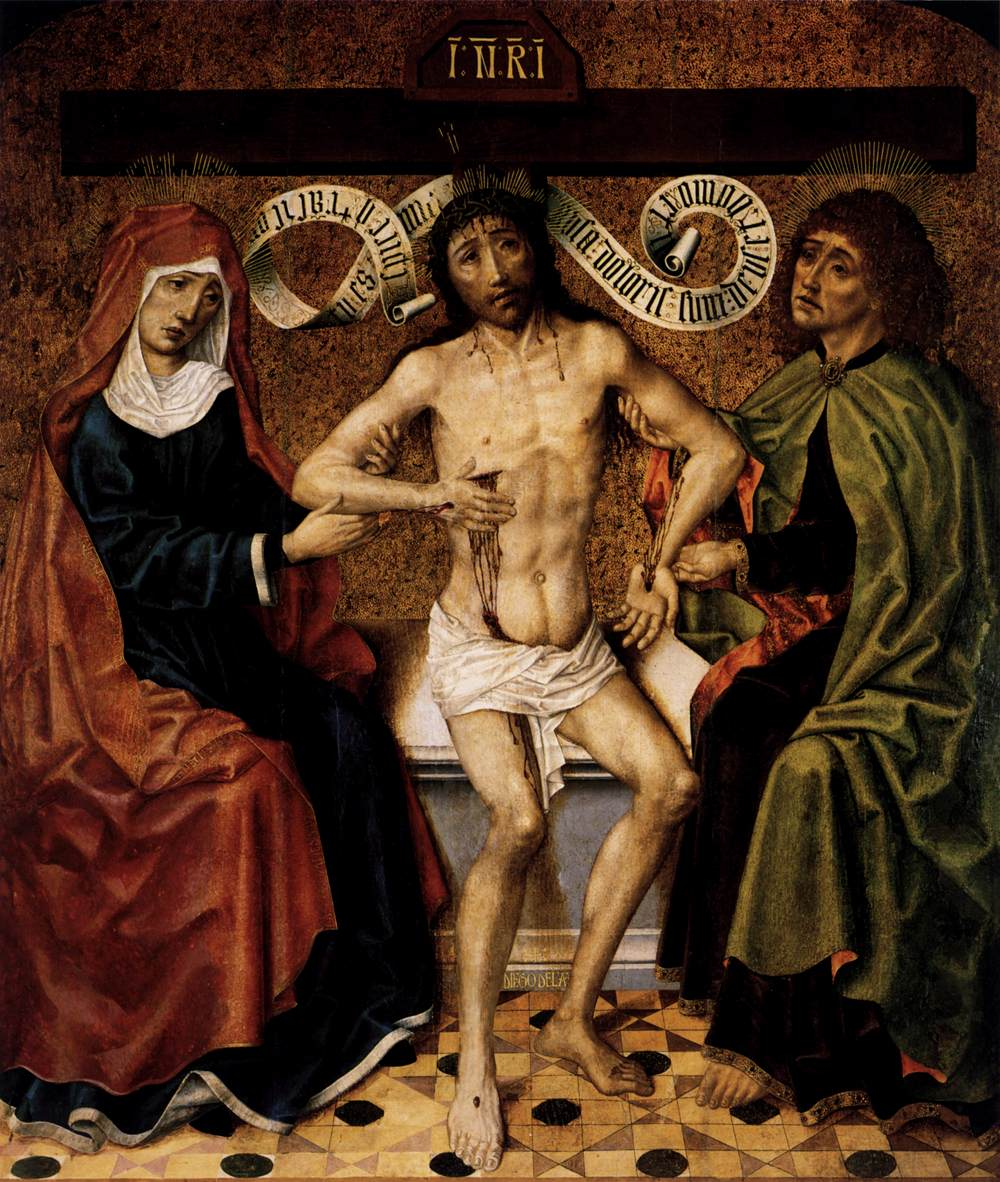
Cristo de Varón de Dolores entre la Virgen y San Juan (Pietà), Museo del Prado

Diego de la Cruz (fl. 1482 – 1500) was a Spanish painter who may have been of Flemish origin. He was active in Burgos and the neighboring region.

== Biography ==
He was long forgotten, until being rediscovered in 1966, thanks to a study by José Gudiol Ricart, who proposed that he was born in Flanders around 1460 and arrived in Spain before the first group of Flemish painters arrived, led by Juan de Flandes. Other researchers, such as José Camón Aznar presumed that he was born in Spain; probably Castile. This viewpoint was supported by Didier Martens (born 1960), who published a study on the subject in 2001. The influence upon his work by painters of the Burgundian Netherlands, such as Rogier van der Weyden, especially in his treatment of light, may be explained by their presence in Spain, rather than by his origins. Even Guidol suggests that he began as a sculptor and may have started his artistic career in the workshop of Gil de Siloé, who is believed to have been born in Antwerp.

His artistic personality is largely defined by two works: Cristo de Varón de Dolores entre la Virgen y San Juan, at the Museo del Prado; his only signed work, probably created between 1475-1480, and the Estigmatización de San Francisco de Asís at the Iglesia de San Esteban de Burgos (1487-1489). Based on an analysis of these works, it has been possible to make other attributions: notably, Cristo de Piedad entre dos ángeles at the Colegiata de Covarrubias, and the Cristo de Piedad entre los profetas David y Jeremías, the central tableau of the predella of an altarpiece and companion to two other tableaux (of the prophets Isaiah and Daniel) in the collection of the University of Liège, which have been attributed to the German painter, Hans Leonhard Schäufelein.
