= Simón de Colonia =

Spanish architect and sculptor

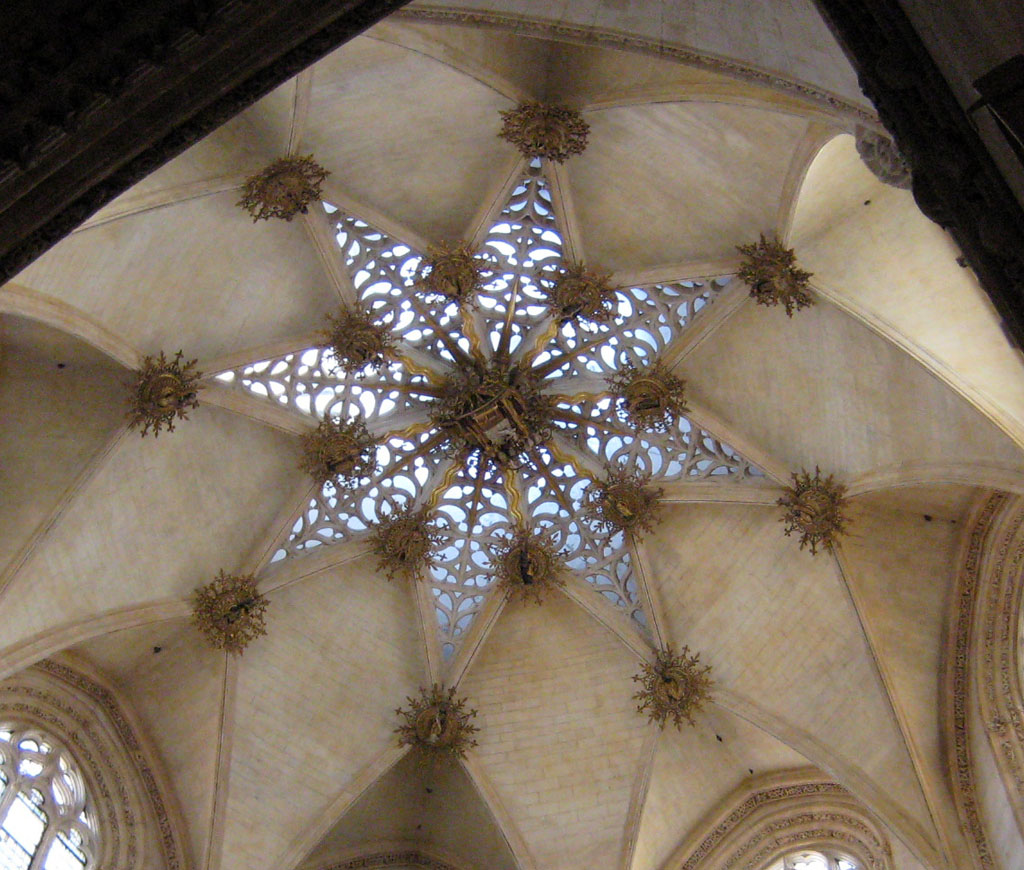
Burgos Cathedral. The interior of the chapel of the Constable.

Simón de Colonia (died 1511) was a Spanish architect and sculptor, son of architect Juan de Colonia and father of architect and sculptor Francisco de Colonia.

Francisco de Colonia was a Gothic style sculptor and architect of the Plateresque.

After his father's death in 1481 Simón succeeded him as master builder of Burgos cathedral. His most famous work is the chapel of the Constable in this cathedral. He also worked on the reconstruction of Miraflores Charterhouse.

Pedro de Velasco built Mencia de Menoza a special palace, The Casa del Cordon, the House of the Cord, is the most important building of Burgos civil architecture and was constructed in the 15th century. It is located at the Plaza de la Libertad. It was built for the Constable of Castile Pedro Fernandez and his wife Mencia de Mendoza, and its architect was Simon de Colonia. The main door of the Casa del Cordon has a Franciscan waist cord that frames the doorway, giving the building its name. Above the doorway there are two coats of arms of the Constables of Castile
