= Juan de Colonia =

German architect

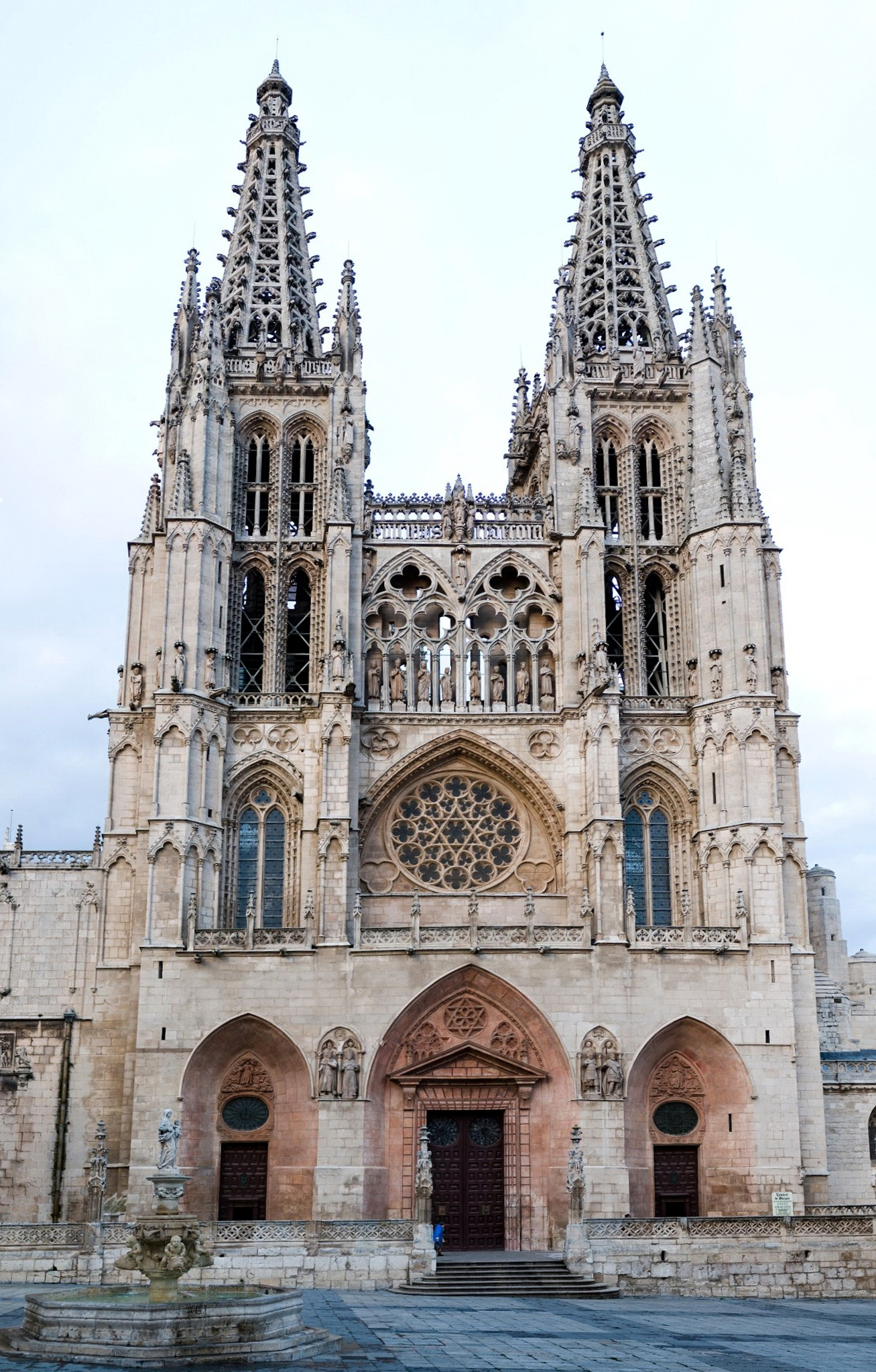
Burgos Cathedral.

Juan de Colonia or Johannes von Köln (about 1410, Cologne – August 3, 1481, Burgos) was a gothic architect who introduced the flamboyant style to Castile.

About 1440 Juan de Colonia was invited by Alfonso de Cartagena, the then bishop of Burgos to work on Burgos Cathedral. He also worked on the reconstruction of Miraflores Charterhouse.

While working in Burgos Juan married a local woman, María Fernández. After his death, his son Simon succeeded him as master builder of the cathedral.
