= Gil de Siloé =

Castilian sculptor of Flemish origin

- Born: Gil de Amberes? c. 1440; Antwerp?
- Died: 1501; Burgos, Spain
- Known for: Sculpture
- Movement: Isabelline Gothic
- Patrons: Isabella I of Castile

Gil de Siloé (Antwerp? 1440s – Burgos, 1501) was a Castilian sculptor of Flemish origin, who worked in Burgos in a late gothic or Isabelline style.

Gil de Siloé came to Castile from northern Europe, probably from the Netherlands. He worked in Burgos and was employed by Queen Isabel I of Castile for several large sculptural projects. He worked in both wood and stone.

His Hispano-Flemish style, which combines influences of the Germanic and Flemish gothic, and Mudéjar, is meticulous in its ornamentation and displays technical virtuosity.

He was the father of an important architect and sculptor, Diego de Siloe.

== Works ==
In Miraflores Charterhouse there are several works by Gil de Siloé:

- The main altarpiece (1496–1499). Gil was assisted by Diego de la Cruz, who was responsible for the polychromy and some of the figures.
- The mausoleum of King John II of Castile and of his wife, Isabella of Portugal (1489–1493).
- The tomb of Juan II and Isabel of Portugal was commissioned by Isabel I of Castile in 1486 and was made between 1489 and 1493. The tomb is made of alabaster and has a star-shaped platform. The life-size figures of Juan II and Isabel of Portugal are surrounded by figures of Evangelists and apostles.
- The funeral monument for Alfonso son of John II and brother of Isabella I of Castile (1489–1492).

For Burgos Cathedral:

- Altarpiece of the chapel of Saint Anne (1486–1492).
- Retable of Saint Anne in the Chapel of the Condestable (c. 1498).

Other works:

- Funeral monument for Don Juan de Padilla for the Monastery of Fresdeval, actually in the Museum of Burgos (c. 1500).
- Enthroned Virgin and Christ Child in alabaster, Cleveland Museum of Art, Cleveland, Ohio, US.

== Attribution ==
It is debated by art historians whether many works attributed to him are by his hand, or are by members of his workshop or by followers. Among them the most outstanding are:

- The façade of the San Gregorio College in Valladolid.
- The doors between the transept and the cloister of Burgos Cathedral.
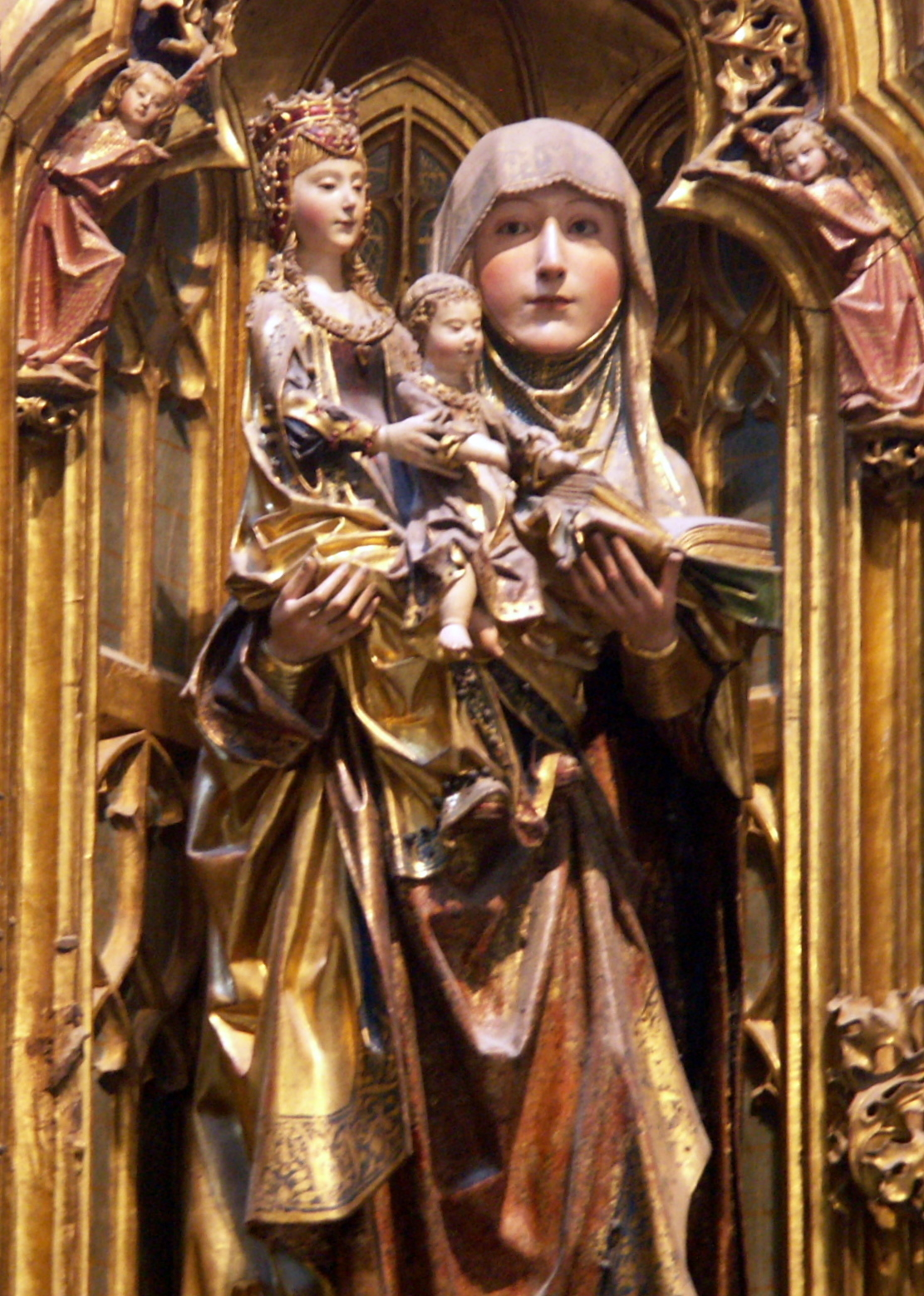
Saint Anna
Chapel of the Condestable
Burgos Cathedral

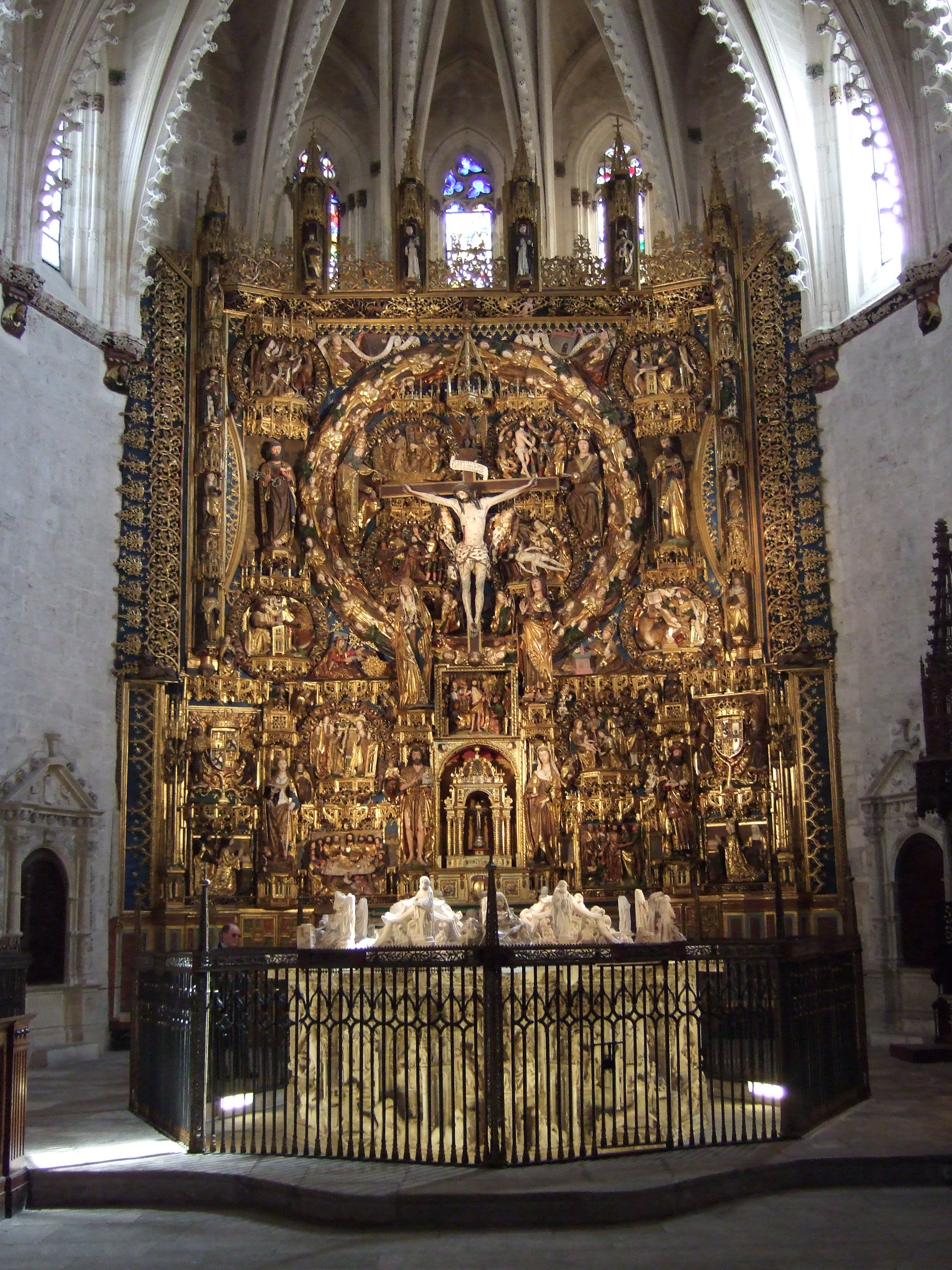
Main altarpiece
Miraflores Charterhouse
Burgos

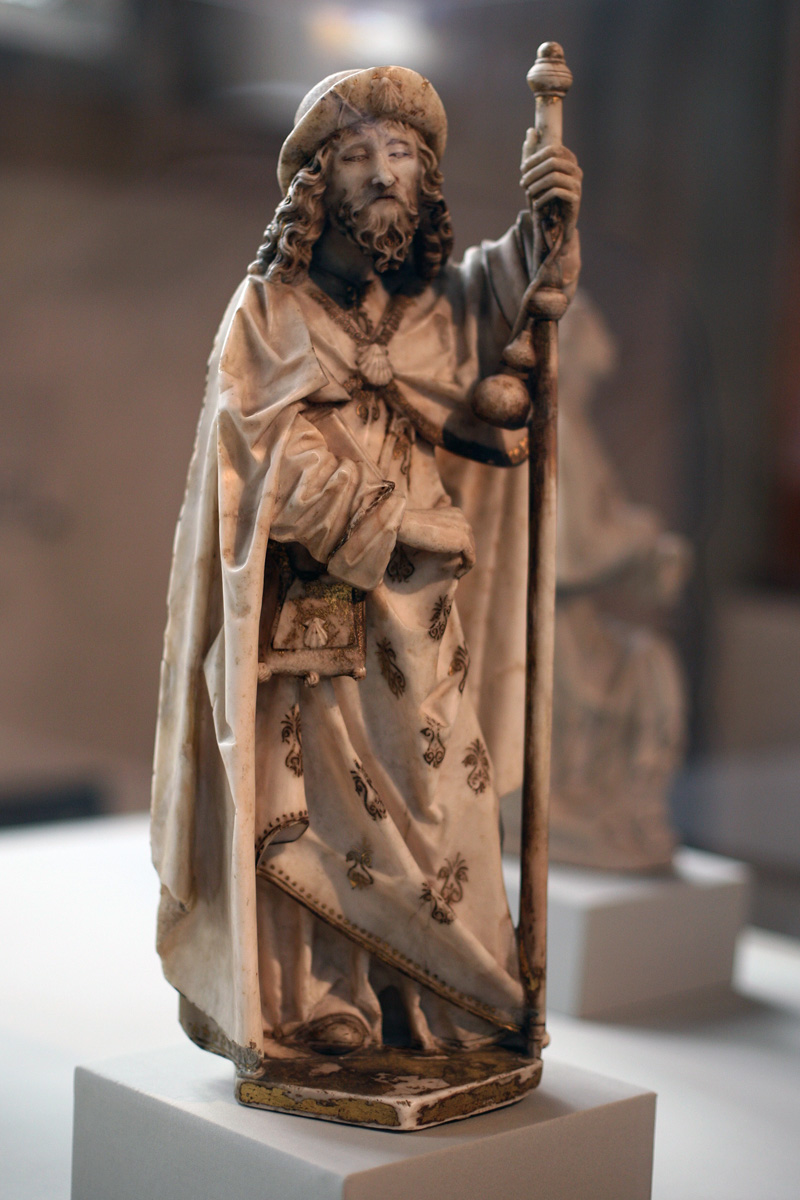
Saint James from the tomb of Juan II and Isabel of Portugal
The MET Cloisters in Manhattan

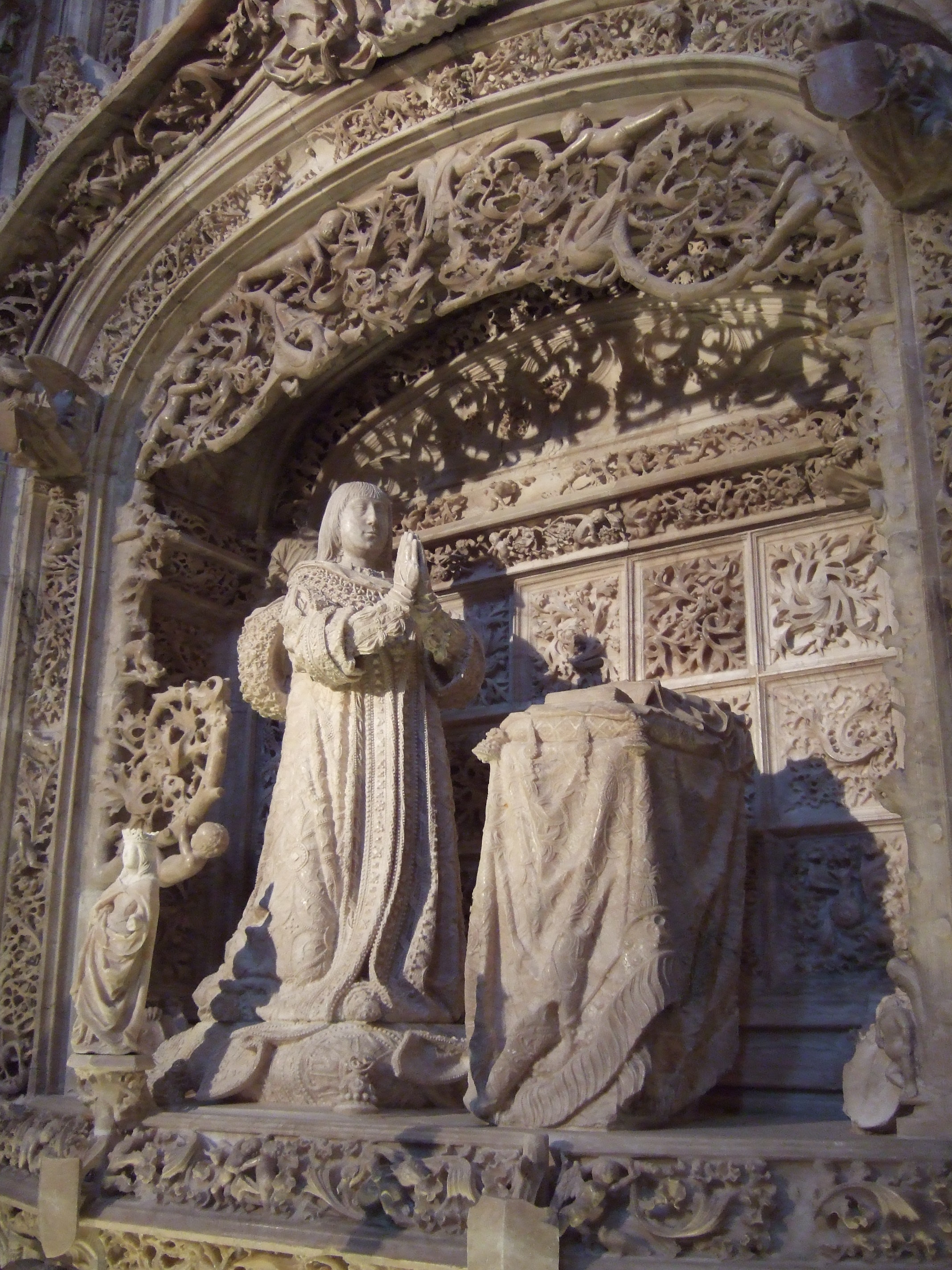
Funeral monument for Alfonso
Miraflores Charterhouse
Burgos

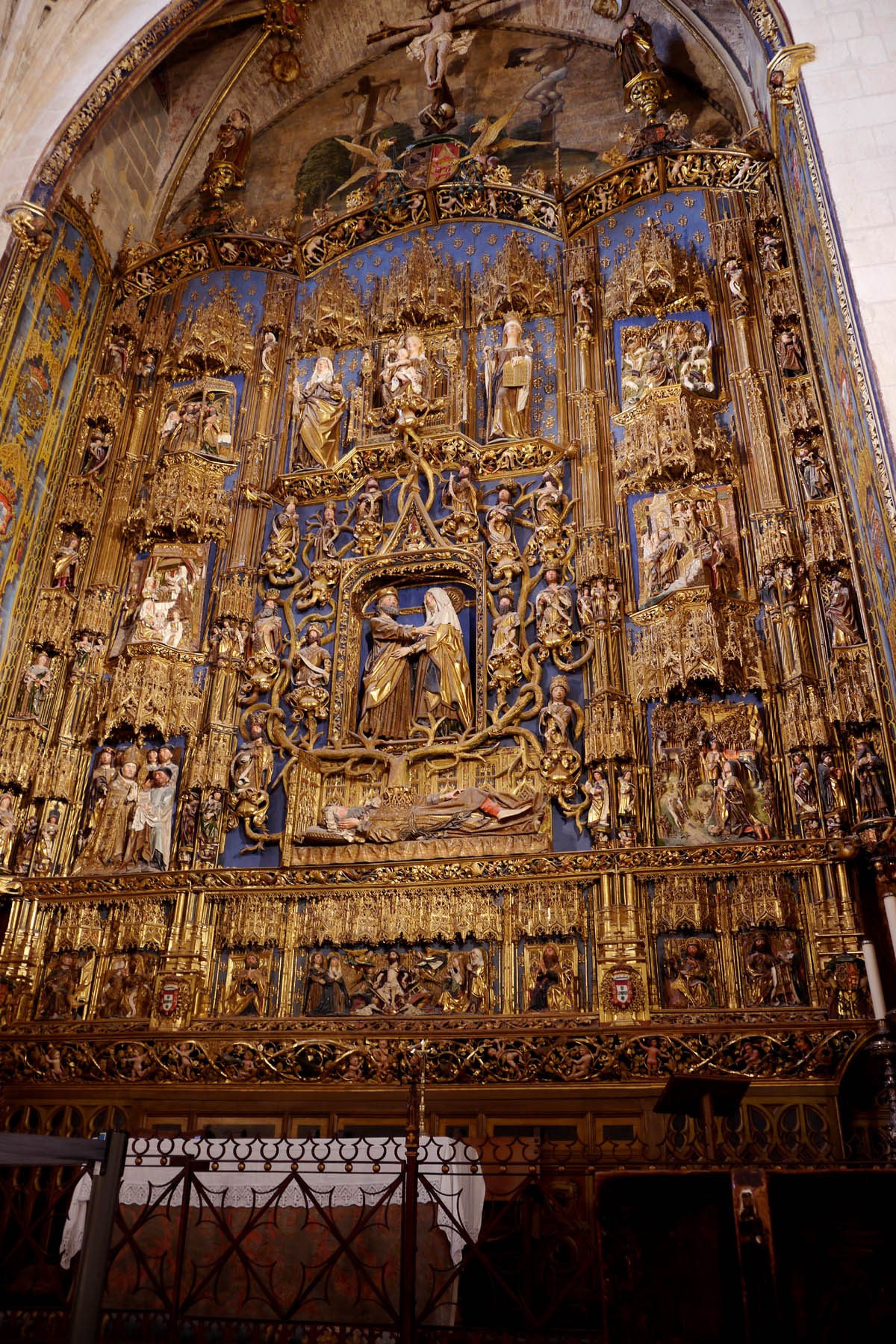
Altar piece of the chapel of Saint Anne
Burgos Cathedral

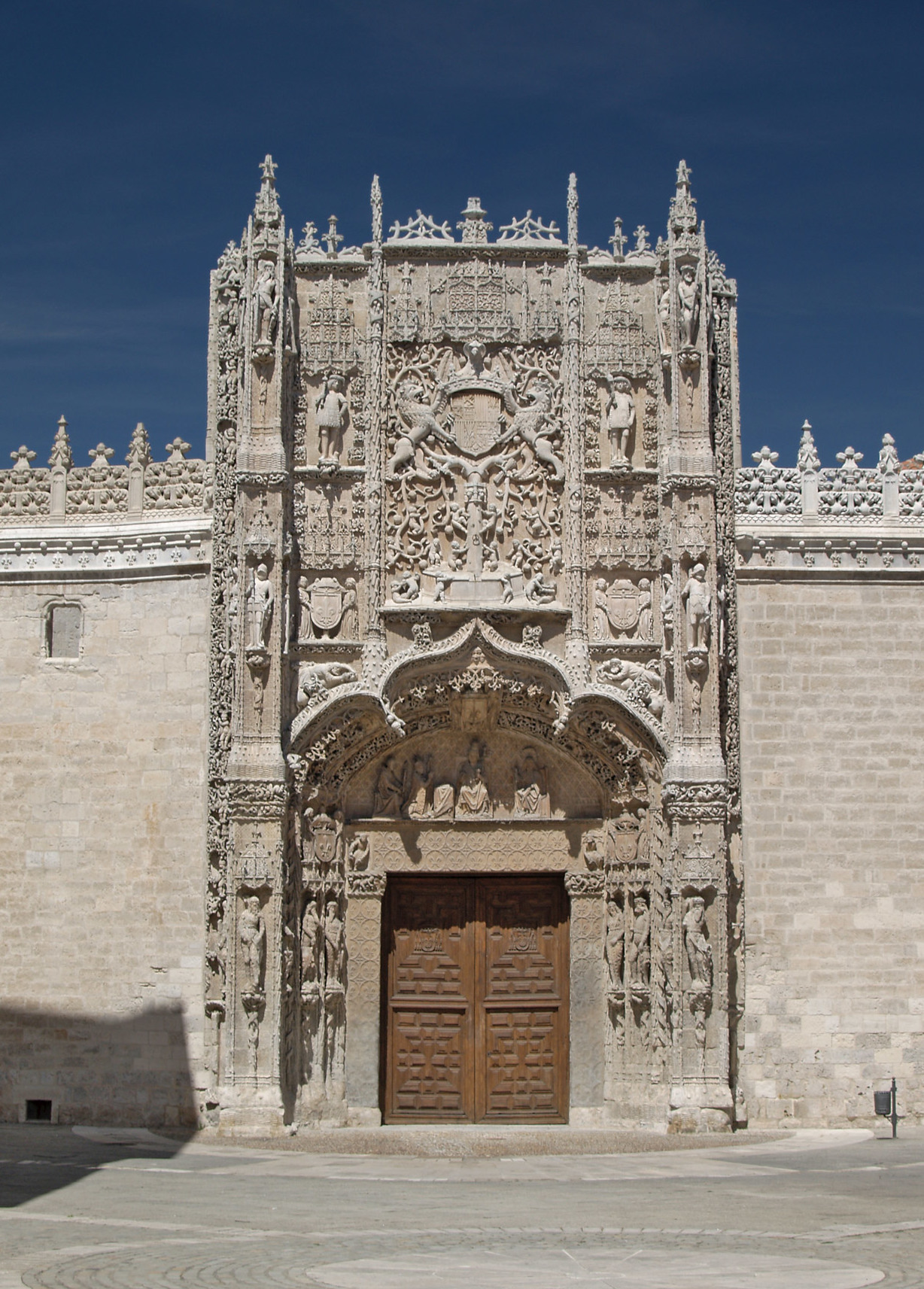
San Gregorio College
Valladolid

== Sources ==
- Ian Chilvers (1990). The Oxford Dictionary of Art and Artists. Oxford University Press. ISBN 978-0-19-953294-0.
