= San Lesmes Abad =

Cultural property in Burgos, Spain

Coordinates: 42°20′35″N 3°41′46″W

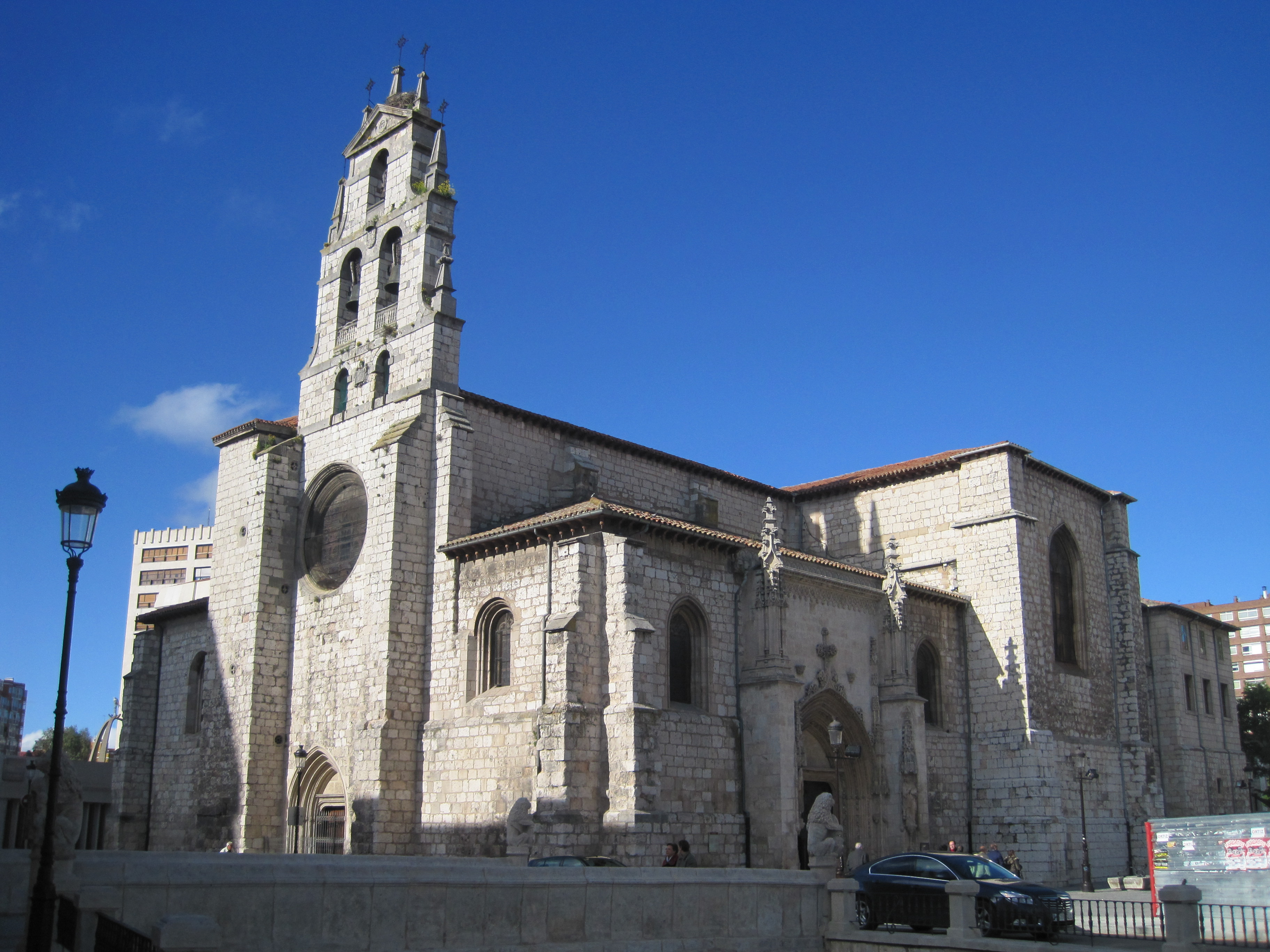
Iglesia de San Lesmes Abad

Iglesia de San Lesmes Abad is a Roman Catholic church in Burgos, Spain.

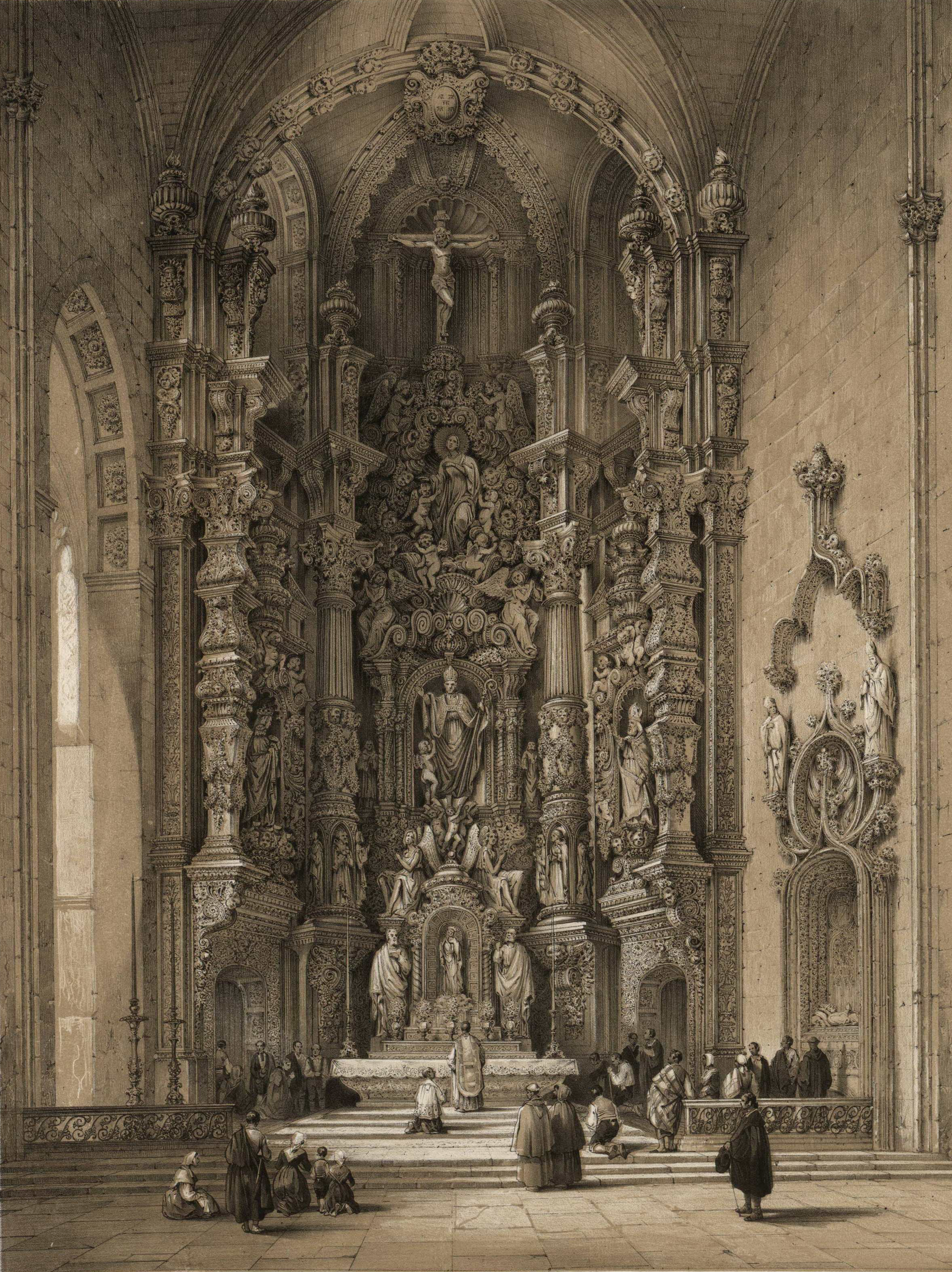
Altar, engraving from 1842

It is located in the Plaza de San Juan, in front of the Public Library, adjacent to the Camino de Santiago. Built in the Gothic style in the 14th century, it contains the remains of Adelelmus of Burgos, the patron of the city. The church underwent restoration in 2012–13.
